= M13 (Johannesburg) =

Metropolitan route in the City of Johannesburg, South Africa

Metropolitan route M13

Route information
- Maintained by Johannesburg Roads Agency and Gauteng Department of Roads and Transport
- Length: 7.7 km (4.8 mi)

Major junctions
- North/East end: M8 / M20 in Cresta
- R512 in Fontainebleau; M71 in Ferndale; M27 in Ferndale
- South/West end: M81 in Hurlingham

Location
- Country: South Africa

Highway system
- Numbered routes of South Africa
← M11	→ M14

The M13 is a short metropolitan route in the City of Johannesburg, South Africa. It connects Cresta in Randburg with Hurlingham in Sandton.

== Route ==
The M13 begins at Republic Road's intersection with Judges Avenue (M8) and the southern part of Republic Road (M20) in Cresta. It heads north through Windsor East and Windsor passing by the Randpark Golf Club. It then passes north through Randpark and Robin Hills before turning eastwards as it passes the suburbs of Fontainebleau and Malanshof and reaches an intersection with Malibongwe Drive (R512). It crosses the intersection, still as Republic Road and continues east into Ferndale, where it intersects and crosses Bram Fischer Drive (M71) and shortly thereafter Jan Smuts Avenue (M27) in Bordeaux. Staying as Republic Road, the route turns north-east through Hurlingham and ends shortly thereafter as a t-junction at Winnie Mandela Drive (M81).
