= M8 (Johannesburg) =

Metropolitan route in the City of Johannesburg, South Africa

Metropolitan route M8

Route information
- Maintained by Johannesburg Roads Agency and Gauteng Department of Roads and Transport
- Length: 6.3 mi (10.1 km)

Major junctions
- West end: M18 Ontdekkers Road, Florida Park, Roodepoort
- M47 Hendrik Potgieter Drive, Floracliffe; N1 Western Bypass, Fairland; M5 Beyers Naude Drive, Northcliff; M13 / M20 Republic Road, Cresta; R512 Malibongwe Drive, Cresta
- East end: M71 Bram Fischer Drive, Linden

Location
- Country: South Africa

Highway system
- Numbered routes of South Africa
| ← M7 | → M9 |

The M8 is a short metropolitan route in the City of Johannesburg, South Africa. It starts in Florida Park, Roodepoort and ends in Linden, Johannesburg to the east.

== Route ==
The M8 begins at a T-junction with the M18 (Ontdekkers Road) in Florida Park, Roodepoort and heads in a north-east direction as William Nicol Drive. It forms an interchange with the M47 at Hendrik Potgieter Drive before continuing east as 14th Avenue and forming an interchange with the N1 highway (Western Bypass) in Fairland. After a short distance, the M8 turns north-east as Weltervreden Road in Berario and as Pendoring Road in Northcliff. Here, the M8 crosses the M5 (Beyers Naudé Drive) and continues north-east, for a short distance, as Judges Avenue through Cresta and crosses the M20 (Republic Road). Continuing eastwards as Judges Avenue, it intersects the R512 (Malibongwe Drive) at a T-junction. Here, the M8 turns north, briefly co-signed with the R512 for 100m and then turns east as the one-way South Road. It reaches 1st Street in Linden where it turns left then right to continue south-east and reach its end at an intersection with the M71 (Bram Fischer Drive).
