= N1 Western Bypass (Johannesburg) =

Road in South Africa

National route N1

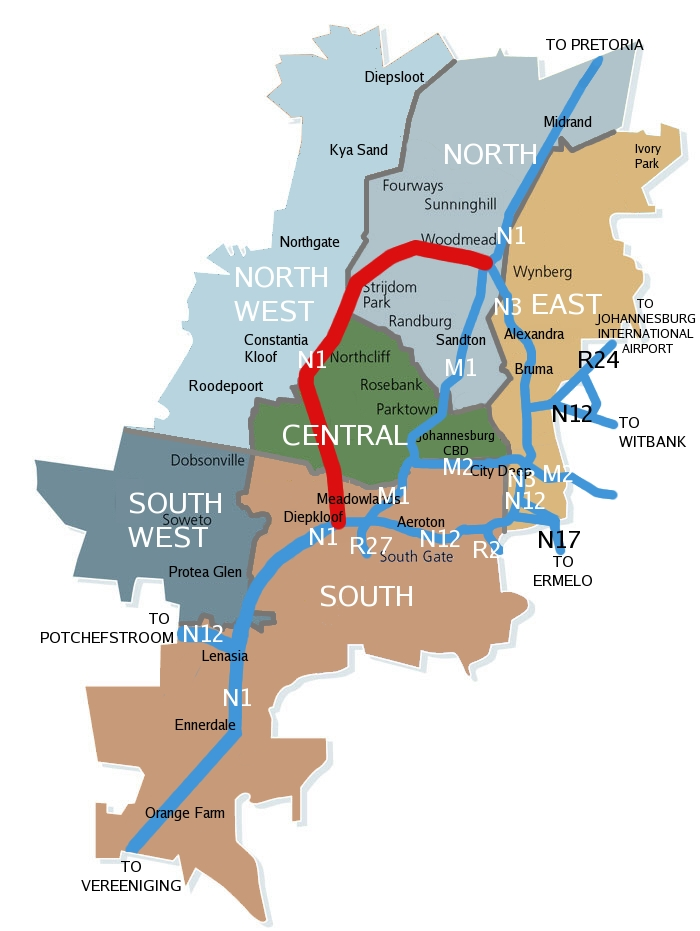

Route information
- Length: 37.9 km (23.5 mi)

Major junctions
- South end: N12 Diepkloof Interchange, Soweto
- M79 Rand Show Road, Diepkloof; M70 Soweto Highway, Diepkloof; N17 near Riverlea; R24 Albertina Sisulu Road Interchange, Bosmont; M8 14th Avenue Interchange, Quellerina; M5 Beyers Naudé Drive Interchange, Randpark Ridge; R512 Malibongwe Drive Interchange, Strijdompark; R511 Winnie Mandela Drive, Bryanston; M9 Rivonia Road Interchange, Woodmead
- North end: N3 / M1 Buccleuch Interchange

Location
- Country: South Africa

Highway system
- Numbered routes of South Africa

The Western Bypass is a section of the N1 and the Johannesburg Ring Road located in the city of Johannesburg, South Africa. Known at the time as the Concrete Highway, the freeway was initially opened in 1975 as a route to avoid the city centre of Johannesburg and to provide access to the western areas of the Witwatersrand. From the south, the Western Bypass begins at the Diepkloof Interchange in Soweto, where it splits from the N12 freeway and ends at the Buccleuch Interchange, where it merges with the N3 Eastern Bypass, M1 South and N1 Ben Schoeman freeways.

The Western Bypass is the longest section of the Johannesburg Ring Road. The freeway is mostly four lanes wide in either direction, but fans out into six lanes between Rivonia and Buccleuch, where there is heavy traffic moving north towards Pretoria. The Western Bypass is part of the N1 road that spans the length of South Africa.

== Route ==
The southern terminus of the N1 Western Bypass is the Diepkloof Interchange, where the co-signed N12 splits off and heads east as the N12 Southern Bypass. At the same interchange, the N1 meets the M79 Rand Show Road (southbound only).

The Western Bypass continues north, with the suburb of Diepkloof to the west, to intersect with the M70 Soweto Highway that connects Soweto to the Johannesburg CBD (northerly off-ramp & southerly on-ramp). Continuing north, near Riverlea, it intersects with a road that is part of the proposed extension of the N17 (northerly on-ramp and southerly off-ramp).

It soon crosses under the R41 near Wisbey Dip, heading north-west past the Newclare Cemetery. Here, it forms the borderline between Johannesburg to the east and Roodepoort to the west. It then intersects the R24 Albertina Sisulu Road Interchange in Bosmont. Continuing in a roughly northerly direction it passes under the M18 Ontdekkers Road before interchanging Gordon Road in Florida Glen. Heading north-west, it intersects with the M8 14th Avenue Interchange at Quellerina. Turning north-east, it passes between the suburbs of Weltevredenpark and Fairland to enter Randburg. Here, it intersects with the M5 (Beyers Naudé Drive) Interchange near Randpark Ridge. Continuing north-east, it crosses under the M6 Ysterhout Drive in Bromhof.

Continuing north-east, it intersects the R512 (Malibongwe Drive) Interchange in Strijdompark. The N1 continues north-east through the northern suburbs of Meadowhurst, Olivedale and Douglasdale before it intersects the R511/M81 Winnie Mandela Drive in Bryanston. Now taking an easterly direction, it passes under the M71 Main Road in Bryanston and then runs parallel with the R564 Witkoppen Road to its north until it intersects with the M9 Rivonia Road Interchange in Rivonia. Here, it becomes 6 lanes in each direction. Continuing east, it passes under the M85 Bowling Avenue and then under the R55 Woodmead Drive to reach the Buccleuch Interchange. At this interchange, it has its north-eastern terminus, meeting the M1 highway south to Johannesburg CBD, the N3 Eastern Bypass to the East Rand in the south-east and the N1 Ben Schoeman Freeway to Midrand and Pretoria in the north.

== Improvements ==
By creating a narrower emergency shoulder, the freeway was widened during the 1990s from two lanes to three lanes in either direction, to alleviate massive traffic congestion on Johannesburg's roads.

From 2007, the Western Bypass was included in the Gauteng Freeway Improvement Project (GFIP), which improved traffic conditions in the province and created jobs in construction. Three of the benefits for users of the bypass now include lighting for the full length of the bypass, increased lanes in most parts of the bypass and increased capacity at the northern interchanges with the bypass. The trade-off for this was a toll project, aimed at the entire national road network in Johannesburg. As a result, the entire Western Bypass was declared an e-toll highway (with open road tolling) with 4 electronic tolling gantries in each direction from 3 December 2013 onwards. On 12 April 2024, e-tolls in Gauteng were shut down, effectively making the entire Western Bypass a toll-free route.

Very noticeably, the road is no longer concrete in construction, but has been tarred for its entire length. This spells a death-knell for its Concrete Highway nickname.

As with the Gauteng Freeway Improvement Project the R511 Winnie Mandela Drive and the M9/R564 Rivonia Road/Witkoppen Road interchanges were completely upgraded. The highway with the improvement project also upgraded all signage to new overhead signage.
