= Randpark =

- Location within Gauteng Location within South Africa
- Coordinates: 26.111°S 27.970°E
- Country: South Africa
- Province: Gauteng
- Municipality: City of Johannesburg
- Main Place: Randburg

Area
  - Total: 0.84 km^{2} (0.32 sq mi)

Population (2011)
  - Total: 1,332
  - Density: 1,600/km^{2} (4,100/sq mi)

Racial makeup (2011)
  - Black African: 15.9%
  - Coloured: 5.0%
  - Indian/Asian: 5.9%
  - White: 73.1%

First languages (2011)
  - English: 67.9%
  - Afrikaans: 21.8%
  - Zulu: 3.1%
  - Sotho: 1.7%
  - Other: 5.5%
- Time zone: UTC+2 (SAST)
- Postal code (street): 2194

Randpark is a suburb of Randburg, South Africa. It is located in the northern suburbs of the City of Johannesburg.

Randpark is a well established area that is quiet and forms part of an area with road closure for security reasons. It is bordered by several other suburbs including Windsor Glen, Robin Hills, Malanshof and Fontainebleau. It is located in the north-west of Johannesburg within the boundary of the N1 highway.

The suburb is residential, It forms part of Johannesburg's sizable man-made forest. It is also the location of the Randpark Golf Club. It is proximate to the city centre, Sandton and the Randburg CBD.

The area is serviced by one highway, namely the N1 Western Bypass, which connects the vicinity to Sandton and Pretoria to the north and to Roodepoort and Soweto to the south. Major arterial routes include Republic Road and Malibongwe Drive (R512).

The closest shopping mall from the Randpark area is the Cresta shopping mall which is located on Republic Rd approx 3 kilometers from Randpark.

Randpark has no schools within its boundaries but there are many schools within surrounding areas including, Robin Hills Primary, Randpark High School, Fontainebleau Laerskool and Randburg Hoërskool.

The only public transport from the area is buses and mini taxis.
