= R564 (South Africa) =

Regional route in South Africa

Regional route R564

Route information
- Maintained by Johannesburg Roads Agency and Gauteng Department of Roads and Transport
- Length: 35.9 km (22.3 mi)

Major junctions
- South-west end: R41, Roodepoort
- R24 Albertina Sisulu Road, Florida Lake; M18 Ontdekkers Rd, Florida Park M47 Hendrik Potgieter Rd, Strubens Valley; M5 Beyers Naudé Drive, near Randpark Ridge; R512 Malibongwe Drive, Northriding; R511 Winnie Mandela Dr, Fourways; M9 / N1 Rivonia Rd, Rivonia; R55 Woodmead Dr, Woodmead
- North-east end: R101 Pretoria Main Road, Buccleuch

Location
- Country: South Africa

Highway system
- Numbered routes of South Africa
← R563	→ R565

The R564 is a Regional Route in the City of Johannesburg Metropolitan Municipality in Gauteng, South Africa. It connects Roodepoort with Buccleuch via Northriding and Fourways.

== Route ==
Its south-western end is a junction with the R41 (Main Reef Road) in Roodepoort, in the southern part of the Florida suburb. It goes northwards through Florida as Westlake Road, meeting the R24 (Albertina Sisulu Road) at the next junction and bypassing Florida Lake, to reach a junction with Clarendon Drive, where it becomes Clarendon Drive westwards. At the next junction, it becomes Christiaan De Wet Drive northwards.

It runs north as Christiaan De Wet Drive, meeting the M18 just after Florida Park (west of Constantia Kloof) and meeting the M86 at Kloofendal, to form an interchange with the M47 (Hendrik Potgieter Drive) at Allen's Nek. It continues north-north-east through the suburbs of Weltevredenpark and Radiokop, where it meets the M6 (John Vorster Drive), to exit Roodepoort and enter the northern suburbs of Randburg and Sandton.

It crosses Johannesburg's M5 road (Beyers Naude Drive) at Honeydew. Here, it becomes known as Northumberland Avenue and heads north-east through the suburbs of Sundowner and Northgate to reach a junction with the R512 (Malibongwe Drive). Before the Malibongwe Drive junction, at the Olivedale Road junction, it passes by the WeBuyCars Dome.

It continues in an east-north-easterly direction from the R512 junction as Witkoppen Road, through the suburbs of Northriding, Bloubosrand, Johannesburg North, Jukskei Park, and Fourways. Here, it meets the south-eastern terminus of the R552 (Cedar Road) and crosses the R511 (Winnie Mandela Drive). After this intersection, it heads east, through Lone Hill, Paulshof (where it meets the M71 Main Road), Sunninghill (where it meets the M9 Rivonia Road) and Woodmead.

At the Eskom Megawatt Park in Sunninghill, it reaches a T-junction with Maxwell Drive and becomes Maxwell Drive eastwards (by way of a right turn). It proceeds to intersect with the R55 road (Woodmead Drive) in Woodmead before passing under the N1 freeway (Ben Schoeman Highway) just north of the Buccleuch Interchange and reaching its end at an intersection with the R101 (Pretoria Main Road) in the Buccleuch suburb.
