= Darrenwood =

- Location within Gauteng Location within South Africa
- Coordinates: 26.130°S 27.977°E
- Country: South Africa
- Province: Gauteng
- Municipality: City of Johannesburg
- Main Place: Randburg

Area
  - Total: 0.36 km^{2} (0.14 sq mi)

Population (2011)
  - Total: 801
  - Density: 2,200/km^{2} (5,800/sq mi)

Racial makeup (2011)
  - Black African: 25.7%
  - Coloured: 4.6%
  - Indian/Asian: 8.0%
  - White: 60.7%
  - Other: 1.0%

First languages (2011)
  - English: 55.3%
  - Afrikaans: 26.8%
  - Zulu: 4.3%
  - Northern Sotho: 2.8%
  - Other: 10.9%
- Time zone: UTC+2 (SAST)
- Postal code (street): 2194

Darrenwood is a suburb in Randburg, South Africa. It lies against the boundary of Johannesburg. Neighbouring suburbs include Linden, Cresta (and the Cresta Shopping Centre), Aldara Park and Blackheath.

Darrenwood is predominantly residential, although the Darrenwood Sports Centre, Darrenwood Shops and the Darrenwood Dam also exist.

It was really only in the 1960s that a substantial number of people started setting up home in Darrenwood.
