= M6 (Johannesburg) =

Road in South Africa

Metropolitan route M6

Route information
- Maintained by Johannesburg Roads Agency and Gauteng Department of Roads and Transport
- Length: 10.2 km (6.3 mi)

Major junctions
- West end: R564 Christian De Wet Road, Glen Dayson
- M5 Beyers Naudé Drive, Randpark Ridge; R512 Malibongwe Drive, Ferndale
- East end: M71 Bram Fischer Drive, Ferndale

Location
- Country: South Africa

Highway system
- Numbered routes of South Africa
← M5	→ M7

M6 is a short metropolitan route in Randburg, South Africa. It begins in the western suburb of Glen Dayson and ends in the east on Bram Fischer Drive in Ferndale.

== Route ==
The western terminus of the M6 is a t-junction with Christiaan De Wet Road (R564) in Glen Dayson. It heads east through Randpark Ridge as John Vorster Road where it intersects and crosses Beyers Naudé Drive (M5). It now becomes Ysterhout Drive and weaves its way through Randpark Ridge where it intersects and crosses President Fouche Drive/Rabie Street. Continuing east, now as Hans Schoeman Street in Bromhof, it crosses over the N1 highway (Western Bypass) then the Klein Jukskei River and into Malanshof and reaches Malibongwe Drive (R512). Crossing Malibongwe Drive, it becomes Hills Street heading east through Ferndale. The M6 then turns north into Main Road and then east into Bond Street. After 1 km, Bond Street meets Bram Fischer Drive (M71) in Ferndale and is the M6's eastern terminus.
