= R552 (South Africa) =

Regional Route in Gauteng, South Africa

Regional route R552

Route information
- Length: 17.06 km (10.60 mi)

Major junctions
- Northwest end: M5 at Elandsdrift
- R512 near Lanseria; R114 near Nooitgedacht
- Southeast end: R564 at Fourways

Location
- Country: South Africa

Highway system
- Numbered routes of South Africa
← R551	→ R553

The R552 is a Regional Route in the City of Johannesburg Metropolitan Municipality in Gauteng, South Africa. It connects Lanseria International Airport with Fourways.

== Route ==
Its north-western terminus is a junction with the M5 (Beyers Naudé Drive) at a place named Elandsdrift. It heads eastwards as Elandsdrift Road to reach a junction with the R512 (Malibongwe Drive; Pelindaba Road) at Bultfontein, just south of the Lanseria International Airport entrance. It continues south-east as 6th Avenue to fly over the N14 highway and reach a staggered junction with the R114 (Lion Park Road).

From the R114 junction, it continues south-east as Cedar Road, through the suburb of Dainfern, through the suburbs of Broadacres and Craigavon, to reach its end at a junction with the R564 (Witkoppen Road) in Fourways, Sandton.
