= M5 (Johannesburg) =

Metropolitan route in the City of Johannesburg

Metropolitan route M5

Route information
- Maintained by Johannesburg Roads Agency and Gauteng Department of Roads and Transport
- Length: 44.9 km (27.9 mi)

Major junctions
- North end: R540
- R552 at Elandsdrift; N14 Interchange, Muldersdrift; R564 Christiaan de Wet, Randpark Ridge; Northumberland, Sundowner; M6 Ysterhout Drive, Randpark Ridge; John Vorster Road, Randpark Ridge; N1 Western Bypass, Randpark Ridge; M8 Judges Avenue/Pendoring Avenue, Blackheath; R24 Albertina Sisulu Road, Mayfair West; R41 Main Reef Road, Riverlea
- South end: M38 Rifle Range Road, Ridgeway, Johannesburg

Location
- Country: South Africa

Highway system
- Numbered routes of South Africa
| ← M2 | → M6 |

The M5 is a long metropolitan route in the Greater Johannesburg metropolitan area in South Africa. It starts in Ridgeway in the southern suburbs of Johannesburg. It passes through Mayfair and Brixton before travelling through Melville, Roosevelt Park, Northcliff, Blackheath and traversing the N1 Western Bypass at Randpark Ridge. It passes under the N14 freeway near Muldersdrift passing through the agricultural holding before ending at Kromdraai Road in the Lindley Agricultural Holdings. The main part of the route runs along Beyers Naudé Drive.

== Route ==
The M5 begins in the southern suburbs of Johannesburg at an intersection with Rifle Range Road (M38) in Ridgeway. As it heads northwards as Nasrec Road, it bypasses the industrial suburb of Aeroton (where it meets a road providing access to the M1 North highway to Johannesburg CBD) before passing the Nasrec showground. It passes the FNB Stadium (famously known as Soccer City) to the west and the Crown Mines Golf Club to the east. Continuing northwards it passes under the Soweto Highway (M70), passing through old gold mining tailings, before reaching a roundabout with a road that's meant to be an extension of the N17 south of Riverlea.

The road continues northwards as the Nasrec Road through the suburb of Riverlea and passes the George Harrison Park, commemorating the place of the first gold discovery on the Witwatersrand in 1886. After crossing Main Reef Road (R41), the M5 becomes Marais Street and Du Toit Avenue in Paarlshoop.

In Langlaagte North, it meets the R24 Albertina Sisulu Road and co-signs with it eastwards before it turns north again at St Jerome Avenue, becoming Mercury Street (separating Langlaagte North from Mayfair West). Turning right into High Street then left into Ditton Avenue in Brixton, the M5 passes the University of Johannesburg. Crossing Kingsway Avenue at Auckland Park, it becomes Main Road, entering the suburb of Melville.

The road becomes Beyers Naudé Drive, originally called DF Malan Drive (renamed on 30 September 2001), and passes through a gorge between the eastern & western sections of the Melville Koppies, high ground with views to the northern and southern suburbs of Johannesburg, and the Koppies hold the archaeological record of the original black inhabitants of the Witwatersrand. Leaving the gorge, the road passes West Park Cemetery on its left and Johannesburg Botanical Garden on its right. It continues north-west through the old suburbs of Randburg like Northcliff, Linden and Cresta. After passing the Cresta Shopping Centre on its right, it intersects and passes under the N1 highway (Western Bypass) a few kilometres later. Continuing north-west through Randpark Ridge it crosses over the M6 (Ysterhout Drive) and after 4km it intersects with Christian De Wet Road and Northumberland Avenue together part of the R564.

Passing through Honeydew, the suburb thins as it becomes a set of agricultural holdings but continues north-west as Beyers Naudé Drive and intersects the R114 at a staggered junction near Muldersdrift and shortly thereafter the N14 Pretoria-Krugersdorp freeway. Passing over the freeway it continues north-east now through more agricultural holdings before ending at its northern terminus as a t-junction with the R540 (Kromdraai Road) after crossing the Crocodile River.
