= Fairland, Gauteng =

Fairland Fairland
- Location within Gauteng Location within South Africa
- Coordinates: 26°7′44″S 27°56′45″E
- Country: South Africa
- Province: Gauteng
- Municipality: City of Johannesburg
- Main Place: Randburg

Area
  - Total: 5.29 km^{2} (2.04 sq mi)

Population (2011)
  - Total: 9,127
  - Density: 1,730/km^{2} (4,470/sq mi)

Racial makeup (2011)
  - Black African: 22.0%
  - Coloured: 3.4%
  - Indian/Asian: 6.3%
  - White: 67.0%
  - Other: 1.3%

First languages (2011)
  - English: 55.8%
  - Afrikaans: 27.9%
  - Zulu: 3.3%
  - Tswana: 2.6%
  - Other: 10.3%
- Time zone: UTC+2 (SAST)
- Postal code (street): 2170
- PO box: 2030

Fairland is a residential suburb in Randburg, Gauteng, South Africa. The area is neighboured by Northcliff, Cresta and Darrenwood and is one of the most leafy suburbs in the northern suburbs of Johannesburg. Fairland was developed on land that was originally a farm called Weltevreden. Statistics indicate that Fairland has some of the lowest crime statistics within the Greater Johannesburg region.

== Facilities ==
Major shopping centres around Fairland include: Cresta Shopping Centre, Clearwater Shopping Centre, EL Corro Shopping Centre, Fairland Walk Shopping Centre, Trade Centre, Makro etc.

There are a number of schools in the area, namely Laerskool Fairland, and Cliffview Primary School.
