= Rock FM 91.9 =

South Africa
- Broadcast area: Randburg, Fourways, Northriding, Kyalami
- Frequency: 91.9 FM

Technical information
- ERP: 200 Watts

Links
- Website: http://www.rockfm.co.za

Rock FM 91.9 is a music radio station serving the north of Johannesburg. Rock FM is operated under a low power commercial FM license from ICASA.

The signal has an average range of 5–10 km, covering the areas: Northriding, Johannesburg North, Sundowner, Boskruin, Randpark Ridge, Fourways and Randburg.

The power output (ERP) of Rock FM's signal is 1 Watt.

== Coverage Areas ==
- Randburg
- Fourways
- Northriding
- Kyalami

== Broadcast Languages ==
- English

== Broadcast Time ==
24/7

== Target Audience ==
- LSM Groups 8 – 10
- Age Group 20 - 38
- Middle to upper-middle class

== Programme Format ==
- 70% Music
- 30% Talk

== Listenership Figures ==
Estimated Listenership
| | 7 Day |
|---|---|
| Feb 2013 | 9 000 |
| Dec 2012 | 10 000 |
| Oct 2012 | 9 000 |
| Aug 2012 | 3 000 |
| Jun 2012 | 8 000 |
