= R114 (South Africa) =

Regional Route in Gauteng, South Africa

Regional route R114

Route information
- Length: 41 km (25 mi)

Major junctions
- Southwest end: N14 in Muldersdrift
- R512 near Randburg; R552 near Fourways; N14 at Diepsloot West; R511 / N14 near Diepsloot; R55 in Centurion
- Northeast end: R101 in Centurion

Location
- Country: South Africa

Highway system
- Numbered routes of South Africa
← R104	→ R300

The R114 is a regional route in Gauteng, South Africa that runs from Muldersdrift (north-east of Krugersdorp) to Centurion. The designation R114 is applied to sections of road that were previously part of the N14 that have been replaced by newly built freeway sections.

== Route ==
The route begins in Muldersdrift (north-east of Krugersdorp), in the Mogale City Local Municipality, at a junction with the N14 national route. It parallels the N14 in a northeasterly direction (while being on the southern side of the N14) and meets the M5 road of Johannesburg (Beyers Naude Drive), which connects to Randburg. It is co-signed with the M5 south-east up to the next junction, where it becomes its own road northeast as Nooitgedacht Road. It proceeds to form a junction with the R512 road (Malibongwe Drive) south of Lanseria International Airport in the City of Johannesburg Metropolitan Municipality. The R512 also connects to Randburg in the south-east.

Soon after meeting the R512, it meets the R552 road (Cedar Road), which connects to Fourways and Sandton in the south-east. The R114 proceeds north-east to bypass the township of Diepsloot. In Diepsloot West, it crosses to the northern side of the parallel N14 highway to bypass Diepsloot's central area. At the point of crossing to the northern side of the N14, the R114 enters the City of Tshwane Metropolitan Municipality.

Just after crossing over the N14, it meets the R511 road, which goes to Sandton in the south and Hartbeespoort in the north. The R511 and R114 are co-signed northwards up to the next junction, where the R114 becomes its own road eastwards.

From the R511 junction, the R114 continues eastwards to form a junction with the R55 road (Voortrekker Street) in the Heuweloord suburb of Centurion. At this junction, it turns to the northeast and proceeds through the Wierdapark and Eldoraigne suburbs of Centurion to end at a junction with the R101 road (Old Johannesburg Road).
