= Bordeaux, Gauteng =

Bordeaux
- Location within Gauteng Location within South Africa
- Coordinates: 26°05′51″S 28°00′51″E
- Country: South Africa
- Province: Gauteng
- Municipality: City of Johannesburg
- Main Place: Randburg
- Established: 1940

Area
  - Total: 1.57 km^{2} (0.61 sq mi)

Population (2011)
  - Total: 3,790
  - Density: 2,410/km^{2} (6,250/sq mi)

Racial makeup (2011)
  - Black African: 35.3%
  - Coloured: 3.8%
  - Indian/Asian: 8.8%
  - White: 50.4%
  - Other: 1.6%

First languages (2011)
  - English: 65.3%
  - Zulu: 6.6%
  - Afrikaans: 5.8%
  - Northern Sotho: 3.3%
  - Other: 19.0%
- Time zone: UTC+2 (SAST)
- Postal code (street): 2194

Bordeaux is a suburb of Johannesburg, South Africa. Found north of the Johannesburg CBD, it is next to the suburbs of Ferndale, Blairgowrie and Hurlingham. It is located in Region B of the City of Johannesburg Metropolitan Municipality.

== History ==
The suburb is situated on part of an old Witwatersrand farm called Klipfontein 479. It was established in April 1940 and named after the French city of Bordeaux.

== Schools ==
The suburb currently has only one school, Bordeaux Primary. The other, Greenhills Primary School, was closed down (year TBC) owing to dwindling young population in the area.
