= North Riding (disambiguation) =

North Riding may mean:

- North Riding of Yorkshire, England
- North Riding of Lindsey, Lincolnshire, England
- North Tipperary, Ireland
- Northriding, suburb of Randburg, South Africa
