= R512 (South Africa) =

Road in South Africa

Regional route R512

Route information
- Maintained by SANRAL and GDRT
- Length: 63 km (39 mi)

Major junctions
- North end: R511 in Brits
- R566 near Brits; N4 near Brits; R560 west of Hartbeespoort; R552 near Lanseria; N14 near Lanseria; R114 near Lanseria; R564 in Johannesburg North; N1 (Western Bypass) in Randburg
- South end: M20 in Linden

Location
- Country: South Africa
- Major cities: Brits, Broederstroom, Randburg

Highway system
- Numbered routes of South Africa
← R511	→ R513

The R512 is a Regional Route in South Africa that connects Brits, North West with Randburg, Gauteng via the western side of Hartbeespoort. It is an alternative route to the R511 for travel between the Johannesburg Metropole and Brits.

== Route ==
=== North West ===
Its northern origin is a junction with the R511 road (Hendrik Verwoerd Drive) in Brits in the North West Province. It heads south-west as Van Velden Street, then southwards as Rutgers Street, to reach a junction with the R566 road.

The R512 continues southwards to meet the N4 highway (Platinum Highway). Just after meeting the N4, the R512 reaches an interchange with the Pampoen Nek Pass (which is coming from the N4 West in the west) and it leaves the southerly road to become the Pampoen Nek Pass south-eastwards, passing under the R104 route, to reach an interchange with the R560 route west of Kosmos Village. From the R560 interchange, it continues south-east, crossing the Magalies River & turning eastwards at a T-junction, bypassing the Hartbeespoort Dam to the south, to pass through the town of Broederstroom.

After Broederstroom (west of Pelindaba), by the Crocodile River, as the road eastwards connects to Pretoria, the R512 turns southwards, as Pelindaba Road, towards Johannesburg. Just after, the R512 crosses into Gauteng.

=== Gauteng ===
From Broederstroom, the R512 makes a 25 km journey to enter the City of Johannesburg Metropolitan Municipality and reach the Lanseria International Airport. The road then meets the R552 (6th Road) at Bultfontein and forms an interchange with the N14 highway (Pretoria-Krugersdorp Highway). Here, it changes its name from Pelindaba Road to Malibongwe Drive.

After crossing the N14 highway and the R114 road, it heads south towards Randburg as Malibongwe Drive - formerly known as Hans Strijdom Drive. It passes through the lower-middle Cosmo City and Kya Sands townships before crossing the R564 road (Witkoppen Road; Northumberland Avenue) and entering the more affluent Northriding and Olivedale suburbs. The R512 reaches an interchange with the N1 highway (Johannesburg Western Bypass) before continuing through Randburg as Malibongwe Drive, then West Street, to end in Linden, Johannesburg (north of the Johannesburg Botanical Garden), at a junction with the M20.

== History and developments ==
Before September 2020, the R512 from the R560 interchange to the N4 interchange took a different route.

At the R560 interchange, the R512 turned towards the north-east, bypassing Kosmos Village, to reach a 4-way junction in the suburb of Damdoryn (west of the Hartbeespoort Dam wall), where it turned to the west to be co-signed with the R104. After 5 kilometres, the R512 split from the R104 to become its own road northwards, proceeding to cross the N4 and enter Brits.

As of 03 September 2020, a new route has been opened named the Pampoen Nek Pass, effectively continuing the R512 northwards from the R560 interchange for 6 km as a dual carriageway over a section of the Magaliesberg up to the next off-ramp junction just south of the R512 & N4 interchange (north of the old R512 & R104 split), where the R512 now becomes the road northwards towards Brits while the Pampoen Nek Pass continues westwards to join the N4 West.

This new routing of the R512 effectively reduces the distance of the route from Broederstroom to Brits by 6 km.

=== Pampoen Nek Pass ===
The South African National Roads Agency (SANRAL) constructed a shortcut for the R512 route, from its intersection with the R560 route (north-west of Broederstroom) northwards up to just north of where the R512 and the R104 route split (west of The Elephant Sanctuary of Hartbeespoort), where there is a ramp onto the N4 Platinum Highway West, in a highway format. A company named Zutari was called on in 2008 to do a geotechnical analysis to determine the approximate quantity of suitable material in the dyke of the cutting followed by a slope stability analysis, with the project being launched in April 2017 by Aveng-Lobocom Joint Venture.

The R512's junction with the R560 west of Hartbeespoort Dam is an off-ramp junction and the next and last junction just north of the old R104 and R512 junction west of the Elephant Sanctuary is also an off-ramp interchange before the freeway goes westwards to join the N4 West.

It was built to reduce the traffic that occurs on the older longer section of the R512 through Damdoryn, which is also labelled as a high accident zone adjacent to Kosmos Village. It is meant to be a shortcut and to reduce the distance for travelers from the Johannesburg Municipality and Pretoria West using the R512 to either join the N4 Highway West to Rustenburg & Sun City or to go to Brits. To some extent, this new route also reduces the traffic on the R511 route, which passes on the other side of the Hartbeespoort Dam (through Hartbeespoort Central) on its way to Brits, and long distance movements will no longer have to interfere with local traffic.

On 3 September 2020, the Minister of Transport, Fikile Mbalula, together with the South African National Roads Agency and the Madibeng Local Municipality, officially opened the new road. This route, known as the Pampoen Nek Highway, is 6 kilometres in length from the R560 interchange to the interchange where the R512 turns north towards Brits (6 kilometres shorter than the old Z-shaped route passing by Kosmos Village, Damdoryn and the Elephant Sanctuary). It cost R377 million to build.
