= Berario =

- Location within Gauteng Location within South Africa
- Coordinates: 26.134°S 27.954°E
- Country: South Africa
- Province: Gauteng
- Municipality: City of Johannesburg
- Main Place: Randburg
- Established: 1946

Area
  - Total: 1.04 km^{2} (0.40 sq mi)

Population (2011)
  - Total: 2,248
  - Density: 2,160/km^{2} (5,600/sq mi)

Racial makeup (2011)
  - Black African: 18.0%
  - Coloured: 4.3%
  - Indian/Asian: 3.3%
  - White: 73.1%
  - Other: 1.3%

First languages (2011)
  - English: 70.1%
  - Afrikaans: 17.8%
  - Zulu: 2.6%
  - Xhosa: 2.0%
  - Other: 7.5%
- Time zone: UTC+2 (SAST)
- Postal code (street): 2195

Berario is a suburb of Johannesburg, in the South African province of Gauteng. It is located in Region B of the City of Johannesburg Metropolitan Municipality. It is located just below Northcliff Hill and close to Cresta Shopping Centre.

== History ==
The original farm on which the area of Berario stands today, was bought by Ario Canova in 1942. Berario was named after Ario and his partner, Ber Sarnie. In the early forties Ario Canova bought a farm north of Aasvoel Kop, (Northcliff Hill), which is now Berario, for the sum of 51 000 pounds. The original Farmhouse still stands in the now Brooklands Estate, and was sold in 2010 for R7,5 million.

The farm was divided into about 535 stands of various sizes and the district of Berario proclaimed in 1946. The stands began to sell in 1947 for an average price of 900 pounds, and by 1953 they were all sold. The suburb was built up by 1965. Peri-Urban Areas Health Board would manage the area until the City of Johannesburg in 1969.
