= Broadacres =

Broadacres may refer to:

- Broadacres, Gauteng, a suburb of Johannesburg, South Africa
- Broadacres, Saskatchewan, a hamlet in Saskatchewan, Canada
- Broadacres, Houston, a neighborhood in Houston, United States

== See also ==
- Broadacre, a designation of land in Australia
- Broad Acres, Michigan, an unincorporated community in Michigan
