= Riverlea =

Riverlea may refer to:

- Riverlea, Ohio, a small United States city
- Riverlea, New Zealand, a suburb of Hamilton
- Riverlea, Johannesburg a township in Johannesburg, Gauteng, South Africa

== See also ==
- Riverlea Park, South Australia, a northern suburb of Adelaide
