= Northgate Shopping Centre, Johannesburg =

Shopping Centre in Johannesburg North, South Africa

Northgate Shopping Centre
- Location: Johannesburg, South Africa
- Coordinates: 26.060807420820428°S 27.946575117194914°E
- Address: Cnr Northumberland Ave, Olievenhout Ave, Northgate, Randburg
- Opened: 1991
- Owner: Growthpoint Properties

Northgate Shopping Centre is a regional shopping centre located in Northgate, Randburg, in northern Johannesburg, Gauteng, South Africa. The centre opened in the 1991, and it serves the surrounding residential suburbs along with being notable for housing one of the remaining public ice rinks in the Johannesburg area, as well as the WeBuyCars Dome, an indoor car showroom.
