= Rock Radio (disambiguation) =

Rock Radio is a former British radio network.

Rock Radio or Rock FM may also refer to:

- Rock FM (Spanish radio station)
- Rock FM (British radio station), based in Preston, Lancashire
- Rock FM 91.9, a radio station based in Johannesburg, South Africa
- The Rock Radio Network, based in Puerto Rico

== See also ==
- Radio Rock
- Modern rock
