= Riverbend, Gauteng =

Riverbend
- Location within Gauteng Location within South Africa
- Coordinates: 26.012°S 27.965°E
- Country: South Africa
- Province: Gauteng
- Municipality: City of Johannesburg
- Main Place: Randburg

Area
  - Total: 1.04 km^{2} (0.40 sq mi)

Population (2011)
  - Total: 4,364
  - Density: 4,200/km^{2} (10,900/sq mi)

Racial makeup (2011)
  - Black African: 97.8%
  - Coloured: 0.5%
  - Indian/Asian: 0.3%
  - White: 1.4%

First languages (2011)
  - S-Ndebele: 19.5%
  - Zulu: 14.0%
  - Northern Sotho: 12.1%
  - Venda: 11.2%
  - Other: 43.2%
- Time zone: UTC+2 (SAST)

Riverbend is a suburb of Johannesburg, South Africa. It is located in Region B of the City of Johannesburg Metropolitan Municipality.

It consists of a few small agricultural holdings, as well as one area of densely populated alone standing housing.
