= Daniel Brink Park =

- Location within Gauteng Location within South Africa
- Coordinates: 26.074°S 28.000°E
- Country: South Africa
- Province: Gauteng
- Municipality: City of Johannesburg
- Main Place: Randburg

Area
  - Total: 0.07 km^{2} (0.027 sq mi)

Population (2011)
  - Total: 101
  - Density: 1,400/km^{2} (3,700/sq mi)

Racial makeup (2011)
  - Black African: 14.9%
  - Indian/Asian: 1.0%
  - White: 84.2%

First languages (2011)
  - English: 61.4%
  - Afrikaans: 24.8%
  - Southern Ndebele: 5.0%
  - Zulu: 5.0%
  - Other: 4.0%
- Time zone: UTC+2 (SAST)

Daniel Brink Park is a suburb of Johannesburg, South Africa, in Region B of the City of Johannesburg Metropolitan Municipality.
