= Northriding =

- Location within Gauteng Location within South Africa
- Coordinates: 26.051°S 27.939°E
- Country: South Africa
- Province: Gauteng
- Municipality: City of Johannesburg
- Main Place: Randburg

Area
  - Total: 2.53 km^{2} (0.98 sq mi)

Population (2011)
  - Total: 7,521
  - Density: 2,970/km^{2} (7,700/sq mi)

Racial makeup (2011)
  - Black African: 27.2%
  - Coloured: 2.9%
  - Indian/Asian: 11.7%
  - White: 57.3%
  - Other: 0.9%

First languages (2011)
  - English: 66.3%
  - Afrikaans: 16.2%
  - Zulu: 3.7%
  - Xhosa: 2.7%
  - Other: 11.2%
- Time zone: UTC+2 (SAST)
- Postal code (street): 2188
- PO box: 2162

Northriding is a suburb of Randburg in Gauteng, South Africa. It is located in Region C of the City of Johannesburg Metropolitan Municipality.

The suburb was named after one of the three historic subdivisions of Yorkshire. 'North' was favoured at the time due to Northriding's location north of the CBD of Johannesburg. The suburb formerly fell under the jurisdiction of the Randburg Town Council before it was incorporated into the City of Johannesburg Metropolitan area. Of the original 3 farms that were joined to form Randburg, Northriding was located on the Olievenhout farm.

Surrounding suburbs include: Olivedale, Northworld, Northwold Garden, Northgate, Johannesburg North, Noordhang and Golden Harvest.

Main streets in the suburb include Blandford, Bellair and Malibongwe (previously Hans Strijdom) with the original entrance roads of Windsor and Smith, Ascot and Hyperion. Northriding includes various shopping centres. Various streams flow through the area, one such flowing from west to north-east is the Olievenhoutspoort.

Miriam Makeba lived in the suburb at the time of her death.
