= Ruiterhof =

- Location within Gauteng Location within South Africa
- Coordinates: 26.100°S 27.983°E
- Country: South Africa
- Province: Gauteng
- Municipality: City of Johannesburg
- Main Place: Randburg

Area
  - Total: 0.70 km^{2} (0.27 sq mi)

Population (2011)
  - Total: 786
  - Density: 1,100/km^{2} (2,900/sq mi)

Racial makeup (2011)
  - Black African: 24.4%
  - Coloured: 1.7%
  - Indian/Asian: 7.3%
  - White: 66.4%
  - Other: 0.3%

First languages (2011)
  - Afrikaans: 45.0%
  - English: 37.9%
  - Tswana: 4.7%
  - Zulu: 3.5%
  - Other: 8.9%
- Time zone: UTC+2 (SAST)
- Postal code (street): 2194

Ruiterhof is a suburb of Johannesburg, South Africa. It is located in Region B of the City of Johannesburg Metropolitan Municipality.
