= Malibongwe Drive =

Regional route R512

Route information
- Maintained by Johannesburg Roads Agency and Department of Roads and Transport (Gauteng)
- Length: 11.25 mi (18.11 km)

Major junctions
- North end: N14, Muldersdrift
- R114 Old Pretoria Road, near Lanseria; South Africa Drive, Cosmo City; R564 Witkoppen Road, North Riding; N1 Western Bypass, Ferndale; M6 CR Swart Dr, Ferndale; M6 Hans Schoeman Str/Hill Str, Ferndale; M13 Republic Rd, Ferndale; M8 South Rd, Linden; M6 Judges Ave, Cresta
- South end: West Str, Cresta

Location
- Country: South Africa

Highway system
- Numbered routes of South Africa

Malibongwe Drive, formerly known as Hans Strijdom Drive (Afrikaans: Hans Strijdom-rylaan), is a major road that runs through an industrial area in the northwest of Johannesburg, South Africa. It connects Randburg with Northgate and Lanseria International Airport. Malibongwe is said to mean "be praised" or blessed and which the Johannesburg Development Agency says refers to the 1956 Women's March, a woman's march against the carrying of passes.

Hans Strijdom Drive, as well as another major Randburg road, Hendrik Verwoerd Drive, were renamed due to their strong ties to Apartheid. Despite the most popular suggestion for the new name being Nelson Mandela Drive, and Nkululeko Drive emerging as the chosen replacement, Hans Strijdom Drive was renamed Malibongwe Drive at the end of September 2007.

The reaction from businesses along Hans Strijdom Drive was generally negative, however, with only 20 percent supporting the name change. Most businesses cited the high cost of having replacement stationery, business cards etc. made.

The Damelin Randburg campus is located on Malibongwe Drive.

== Route ==
Malibongwe Drive is part of the R512 Route, which connects Randburg with Lanseria International Airport.

== Controversy ==
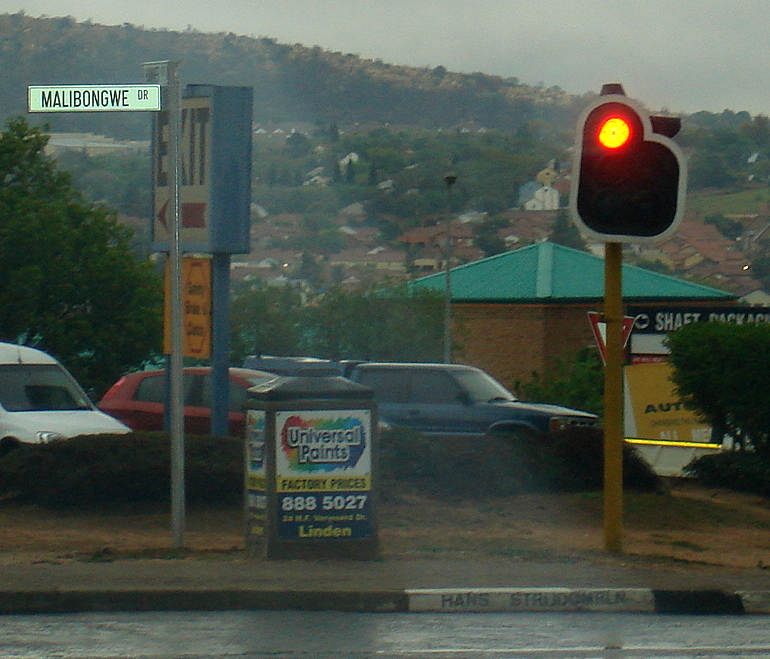
A view across Malibongwe Drive, showing a newly installed road name marker, with the old name, Hans Strijdom-rylaan, still visible on the kerbstone

The change was part of an ongoing plan by the city of Johannesburg to create politically neutral names to replace upsetting reminders of South Africa's racial past. Many of the name changes in South Africa have been met with opposition as some citizens claim the changes to be all black-politically motivated as in OR Tambo. Yet the new name changes have included white historical figures as well, such as Beyers Naude and Bram Fischer (previously DF Malan and Hendrik Verwoerd respectively). Of course, both were anti-apartheid activists.
