= Michael Morton (soccer) =

South African soccer player

Personal information
- Full name: Michael Alan Pearson Morton
- Date of birth: 7 March 1989 (age 37)
- Place of birth: Randburg, South Africa
- Height: 1.80 m (5 ft 11 in)
- Positions: Defensive midfielder; right-back

Team information
- Current team: Cape Town Spurs
- Number: 14

Youth career
- Old Parks
- Randburg AFC
- 2002–2008: Orlando Pirates

Senior career*
Years	Team	Apps	(Gls)
2008–2011	Orlando Pirates	0	(3)
2009–2011	→ Bidvest Wits (loan)	34	(0)
2011–2014	Maritzburg United	80	(1)
2014–2017	SuperSport United	50	(0)
2017–2020	AmaZulu	56	(2)
2020–2021	Cape United	29	(0)
2021–2022	Cape Town All Stars	26	(1)
2022–	Cape Town Spurs	43	(1)
- * Club domestic league appearances and goals as of 15 June 2024

Michael Morton (born 7 March 1989 in Randburg) is a South African football (soccer) player who plays as a midfielder for Cape Town Spurs in the Premier Soccer League.

== Club career ==
Morton started his professional career in 2008/2009 season with Orlando Pirates. Morton spent the 2009/2010 and 2010/2011 seasons on loan at Bidvest Wits, and moved on to join Maritzburg United on a permanent basis from 2011 - 2014.

Morton signed a pre-contract with Supersport United F.C. in January 2014, which saw him join the team for the 2014/2015 season. He spent 3 years at the club (2014/2015; 2015/2016; 2016/2017), before moving on a loan deal to AmaZulu in 2017. Following his contract with Supersport United expiring, Morton signed permanently with AmaZulu.

== Honours ==
=== Nedbank Cup ===
- Winner: 2009/2010 (with Bidvest Wits); 2015/2016; 2016/2017(with Supersport United)

=== Telkom Cup ===
- Winner: 2014/2015 (with Supersport United)
- Runner-up: 2016/2017(with Supersport United)

=== Minor cups ===
==== Gauteng Cup ====
- Winner: 2014; 2016;

==== Nedbank Ke Yona Cup ====
- Winner: 2016
