= Maroeladal =

- Location within Gauteng Location within South Africa
- Coordinates: 26.024°S 27.982°E
- Country: South Africa
- Province: Gauteng
- Municipality: City of Johannesburg
- Main Place: Randburg

Area
  - Total: 2.19 km^{2} (0.85 sq mi)

Population (2011)
  - Total: 4,270
  - Density: 1,950/km^{2} (5,050/sq mi)

Racial makeup (2011)
  - Black African: 25.5%
  - Coloured: 2.4%
  - Indian/Asian: 9.2%
  - White: 60.9%
  - Other: 2.0%

First languages (2011)
  - English: 70.0%
  - Afrikaans: 10.5%
  - Zulu: 3.4%
  - Xhosa: 3.1%
  - Other: 13.0%
- Time zone: UTC+2 (SAST)

Maroeladal is a suburb of Randburg, South Africa. It is located in Region A of the City of Johannesburg Metropolitan Municipality.
