= Beyers Naudé Drive =

Road in Johannesburg, South Africa

Coordinates: 26°07′18″S 27°57′37″E

Metropolitan route M5

Route information
- Maintained by Johannesburg Roads Agency and Department of Roads and Transport (Gauteng)
- Length: 19.3 mi (31.1 km)
- Existed: 1890s–present

Major junctions
- North end: N14, Muldersdrift
- R564 Christiaan de Wet, Randpark Ridge; Northumberland, Sundowner; M6 Ysterhout Drive, Randpark Ridge; John Vorster Road, Randpark Ridge; N1 Western Bypass, Randpark Ridge; M8 Judges Avenue, Blackheath; Pendoring Avenue, Blackheath
- South end: M5 Main Road in Melville, Johannesburg

Location
- Country: South Africa

Highway system
- Numbered routes of South Africa

Beyers Naudé Drive is a large arterial route in Johannesburg, South Africa. It starts at the University of Johannesburg in Auckland Park, travelling through Melville, Roosevelt Park, Northcliff, Blackheath and traversing the N1 Western Bypass at Randpark Ridge. It terminates at the N14 freeway near Muldersdrift. It was previously known as DF Malan Drive. It forms part of Johannesburg's M5 road.

== Background ==
On old Johannesburg municipal maps, the rough roadway was called the Mulders Drift Road. Later it was renamed DF Malan Drive after the South African Prime Minister DF Malan. In September 2001, DF Malan Drive was renamed Beyers Naudé Drive after celebrated anti-apartheid pastor Beyers Naudé. He was excommunicated by the Dutch Reformed Church for his views, but subsequently re-accepted after apartheid's abolition.

The drive links the inner city of Johannesburg to the far western regions of Gauteng over a distance of 30 kilometres. It varies from being three lanes in each direction through Roosevelt Park and Randpark Ridge to being single lanes in each direction through Honeydew/Zandspruit and further out to Muldersdrift.

Several shopping malls, the largest being Cresta Shopping Centre in Blackheath, are located along Beyers Naudé Drive. It is a major arterial route for residents of Randburg and Roodepoort to access the city centre (Braamfontein and the M1 highway through the city centre).
