= Riverlea, Johannesburg =

Residential area in Johannesburg, South Africa

Riverlea
Riverlea residential area in Johannesburg

Riverlea is a low-cost residential area situated in the City of Johannesburg, western part of Johannesburg, Gauteng province, South Africa. Established in the early 1960s during the apartheid era, it was developed to accommodate working-class families. The community is located near significant infrastructure, including the Soccer City stadium and two large mine dumps, which have contributed to ongoing environmental, health and crime challenges.

== Infrastructure and amenities ==
Riverlea is equipped with essential services, including the Riverlea Library, which offers educational resources and community programs. The library provides free Wi-Fi and comfortable study areas, serving as a valuable asset to residents seeking educational opportunities.

In 2022, the community saw the development of Jukskei Park, a recreational area featuring sports facilities and play equipment. Funded through a R2 million investment, the park aims to provide a safe space for children and promote community engagement.

== Socio-economic challenges ==
Riverlea faces significant socioeconomic issues, including crime and drugs. Concerns also extend to Zamimpilo Informal Settlement, located next to Riverlea, where Zama Zama miners arealleged to be residing. Other concens include a high rates of chronic illnesses, including asthma, diabetes, and hypertension, largely attributed to environmental factors and lifestyle. Mental health issues, substance abuse, and unemployment are also prevalent, with reports indicating that approximately 70% of the population is unemployed.

== Environmental and health issues ==
The proximity to mine dumps has led to environmental degradation, with residents experiencing health problems linked to dust and pollution. Community organizations and academic institutions continue to advocate for environmental justice and improved living conditions in the area.

== Community initiatives ==
In response to these challenges, local initiatives have been launched to foster economic development and self-sufficiency. The Ergo Riverlea Livelihoods Programme, supported by DRDGOLD and the City of Johannesburg, focuses on urban agriculture and entrepreneurship. The project includes the development of agricultural facilities and training programs, aiming to create sustainable livelihoods for residents.
