= Marang House =

Marang House was founded by Dr Pieter Ernst in 1998 to provide medical care in a non-institutional environment to seriously ill South African children. Based in Northcliff, Johannesburg, Marang House provides a stable home-environment to disadvantaged children suffering from diseases ranging from diabetes to chronic kidney failure. The children are between the ages of 4 and 14 years and are referred by public hospitals in the Johannesburg and Soweto area.

The word "Marang" was chosen as name as it means a ray of the sun that gives hope in Setswana.

Marang House is a registered non-profit organization and has been approved as a public benefit organization.
