= President Ridge =

- Location within Gauteng Location within South Africa
- Coordinates: 26.101°S 27.988°E
- Country: South Africa
- Province: Gauteng
- Municipality: City of Johannesburg
- Main Place: Randburg

Area
  - Total: 0.76 km^{2} (0.29 sq mi)

Population (2011)
  - Total: 1,702
  - Density: 2,200/km^{2} (5,800/sq mi)

Racial makeup (2011)
  - Black African: 33.0%
  - Coloured: 2.0%
  - Indian/Asian: 8.9%
  - White: 54.3%
  - Other: 1.7%

First languages (2011)
  - English: 42.1%
  - Afrikaans: 31.1%
  - Tswana: 4.1%
  - Zulu: 3.7%
  - Other: 19.0%
- Time zone: UTC+2 (SAST)
- Postal code (street): 2194

President Ridge is a suburb of Johannesburg, South Africa. It is located in Region B of the City of Johannesburg Metropolitan Municipality.
