= Vandia Grove =

- Location within Gauteng Location within South Africa
- Coordinates: 26.067°S 27.993°E
- Country: South Africa
- Province: Gauteng
- Municipality: City of Johannesburg
- Main Place: Randburg

Area
  - Total: 0.27 km^{2} (0.10 sq mi)

Population (2011)
  - Total: 394
  - Density: 1,500/km^{2} (3,800/sq mi)

Racial makeup (2011)
  - Black African: 30.1%
  - Coloured: 1.3%
  - Indian/Asian: 2.5%
  - White: 63.5%
  - Other: 2.5%

First languages (2011)
  - English: 70.4%
  - Sotho: 7.1%
  - Zulu: 6.8%
  - Afrikaans: 5.3%
  - Other: 10.4%
- Time zone: UTC+2 (SAST)
- Postal code (street): 2194

Vandia Grove is a suburb of Johannesburg, South Africa. It is located in Region B of the City of Johannesburg Metropolitan Municipality.
