= Beverley Gardens =

- Location within Gauteng Location within South Africa
- Coordinates: 26°04′27″S 27°59′34″E
- Country: South Africa
- Province: Gauteng
- Municipality: City of Johannesburg
- Main Place: Randburg

Area
  - Total: 0.35 km^{2} (0.14 sq mi)

Population (2011)
  - Total: 646
  - Density: 1,800/km^{2} (4,800/sq mi)

Racial makeup (2011)
  - Black African: 31.0%
  - Coloured: 2.0%
  - Indian/Asian: 3.6%
  - White: 63.2%
  - Other: 0.3%

First languages (2011)
  - English: 67.6%
  - Afrikaans: 10.7%
  - Zulu: 6.2%
  - Northern Sotho: 3.6%
  - Other: 11.9%
- Time zone: UTC+2 (SAST)
- Postal code (street): 2194

Beverley Gardens is a suburb of Johannesburg, South Africa. It is located in Region B of the City of Johannesburg Metropolitan Municipality.
