= Kya Sand =

- Location within Gauteng Location within South Africa
- Coordinates: 26.024°S 27.946°E
- Country: South Africa
- Province: Gauteng
- Municipality: City of Johannesburg
- Main Place: Randburg

Area
  - Total: 2.81 km^{2} (1.08 sq mi)

Population (2011)
  - Total: 3,306
  - Density: 1,180/km^{2} (3,050/sq mi)

Racial makeup (2011)
  - Black African: 98.3%
  - Coloured: 0.1%
  - Indian/Asian: 0.2%
  - White: 1.4%

First languages (2011)
  - Northern Sotho: 22.7%
  - Zulu: 13.9%
  - Tsonga: 12.0%
  - Venda: 10.5%
  - Other: 40.8%
- Time zone: UTC+2 (SAST)
- Postal code (street): 2169
- PO box: 2163

Kya Sand is an industrial suburb of Randburg, South Africa. It is located in Region A of the City of Johannesburg Metropolitan Municipality. The suburb is bordered to the east by Kya Sands Informal Settlement.
