= Kensington B =

- Location within Gauteng Location within South Africa
- Coordinates: 26.076806°S 28.002505°E
- Country: South Africa
- Province: Gauteng
- Municipality: City of Johannesburg
- Main Place: Randburg

Area
  - Total: 1.27 km^{2} (0.49 sq mi)

Population (2011)
  - Total: 1,891
  - Density: 1,490/km^{2} (3,860/sq mi)

Racial makeup (2011)
  - Black African: 40.9%
  - Coloured: 3.4%
  - Indian/Asian: 8.7%
  - White: 45.5%
  - Other: 1.5%

First languages (2011)
  - English: 56.6%
  - Afrikaans: 10.2%
  - Zulu: 7.2%
  - Tswana: 4.9%
  - Other: 21.1%
- Time zone: UTC+2 (SAST)
- Postal code (street): 2194

Kensington B is a suburb in Randburg, which is an area located in northern Johannesburg, Gauteng, South Africa.

Kensington B is part of ward 104 of the City of Johannesburg represented by Counselor Mike Woods.

The area forms part of the KenBrink Residents Association which represents the interests of residents living in the suburb.

== History ==
The majority of Randburg is built on four farms that were owned by Boer pioneers in the 1850s. The four original farms were called Klipfontein, Driefontein, Olievenhoutspoort and Boskop. The history of Driefontein Farm is connected to the arrival of the earliest hunters, settlers and prospectors who crossed the Vaal River in the 1830s and 1840s.

In the 1840s ownership of farms was undocumented and rudimentary allocations were made by the initial South African Republic.

The original Driefontein Farm of 3422 morgen (2931 ha or 29.31 km^{2}), was established in the 1840s and was first owned by LP van Vuuren and then purchased by JJC Erasmus and thereafter by Johannes Lodewikus Pretorius. Pretorius was the first official owner registered at the Deeds Office in Pretoria which was established in 1859.

A Morgen was the amount of land tillable by one man behind an ox in the morning hours of a day. This was an official unit of measurement in South Africa until the 1970s, and was defined in November 2007 by the South African Law Society as 0.856532 ha (1.2 soccer fields). This unit of measure was also used in the Dutch colonial province of New Netherland.

In 1877, Pretorius sold ±900 morgen (771 ha or 7.7 km^{2}) (the south-eastern part of Bryanston), to Antonie Smit. Pretorius continued to farm the remaining portion. When Pretorius died in 1888, the farm was divided amongst his nine sons, each of them paying £60 (equivalent to ± £8000 in today's money) for a ±280 morgen (±240 ha or 2.4 km^{2}) share.

In 1890, one of Pretorius's sons, Gerhadus Jacobus, bought his brothers' portions and consolidated the farm again but as Johannesburg spread northwards, he slowly began to sell off the portions, one of which was to the widow of Mr Jacobus Brink.

In 1906, her son Daniel Brink started farming on the portion of the Driefontein farm, which was later subdivided into the suburbs of Brian Brink, Vandia Grove, Kensington B and Beverley Gardens. The original farm house is currently owned by one of Daniel Brink's descendants and still has Randburg's first windmill which was erected in 1924 by Daniel Brink.

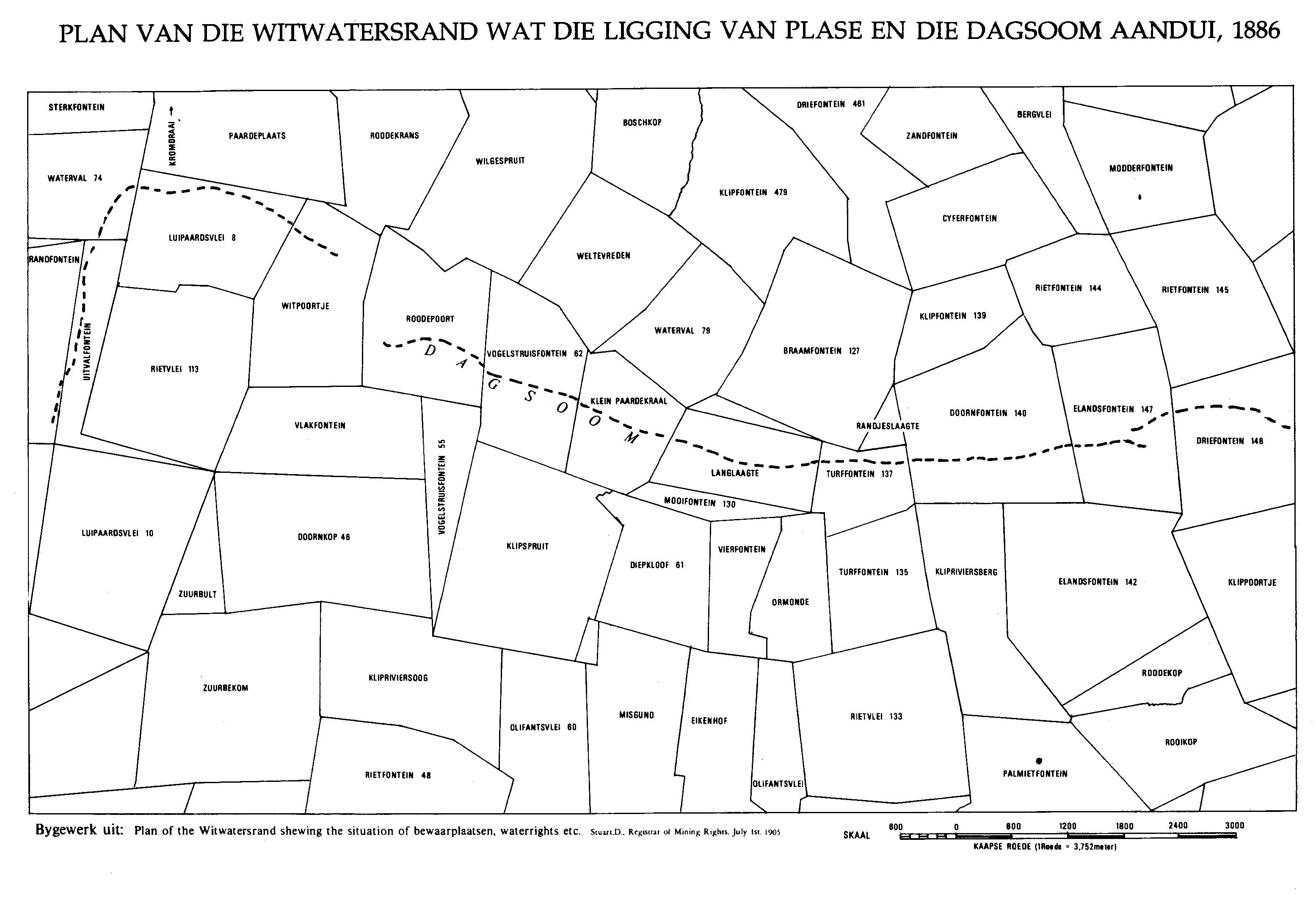
