= Linden, Gauteng =

Linden
- Location within Gauteng Location within South Africa
- Coordinates: 26.135°S 27.992°E
- Country: South Africa
- Province: Gauteng
- Municipality: City of Johannesburg
- Main Place: Johannesburg
- Established: 1901

Government
  - Councillor: Hendrik Bodenstein (Democratic Alliance)

Area
  - Total: 4.04 km^{2} (1.56 sq mi)

Population (2011)
  - Total: 8,629
  - Density: 2,140/km^{2} (5,530/sq mi)

Racial makeup (2011)
  - Black African: 21.8%
  - Coloured: 2.5%
  - Indian/Asian: 7.9%
  - White: 66.7%
  - Other: 1.2%

First languages (2011)
  - English: 49.7%
  - Afrikaans: 30.3%
  - Zulu: 3.7%
  - Tswana: 3.6%
  - Other: 12.7%
- Time zone: UTC+2 (SAST)
- Postal code (street): 2195
- PO box: 2104
- Area code: 2195

Linden is a suburb of Johannesburg, South Africa - situated towards the north western suburbs of the city on the border of the former independent town of Randburg. This established suburb between 5 km (3.1 miles) to 8 km (5.0 miles) north-west of the Johannesburg CBD was designed so that most of the streets and avenues form similar sized blocks. A number of shops, churches and schools can be found on 3rd Avenue and 4th Avenue. Attractions include arts, crafts, studios, coffee shops, pubs, restaurants and small shops. Bordering suburbs include Northcliff, Blairgowrie, Victory Park, Greenside and Cresta.

== History ==
Prior to the discovery of gold on the Witwatersrand in 1886, the suburb lay on land on one of the original farms called Klipfontein. It became a suburb in 1901 and possibly named Johannes van der Linde who laid out the land with Lourens Geldenhuys. Prior to the land being surveyed, it was used to grow fruit. In 1937, it became part of the City of Johannesburg.

In recent years, a number of street cafes have relocated to Linden from Melville.

== Gallery ==
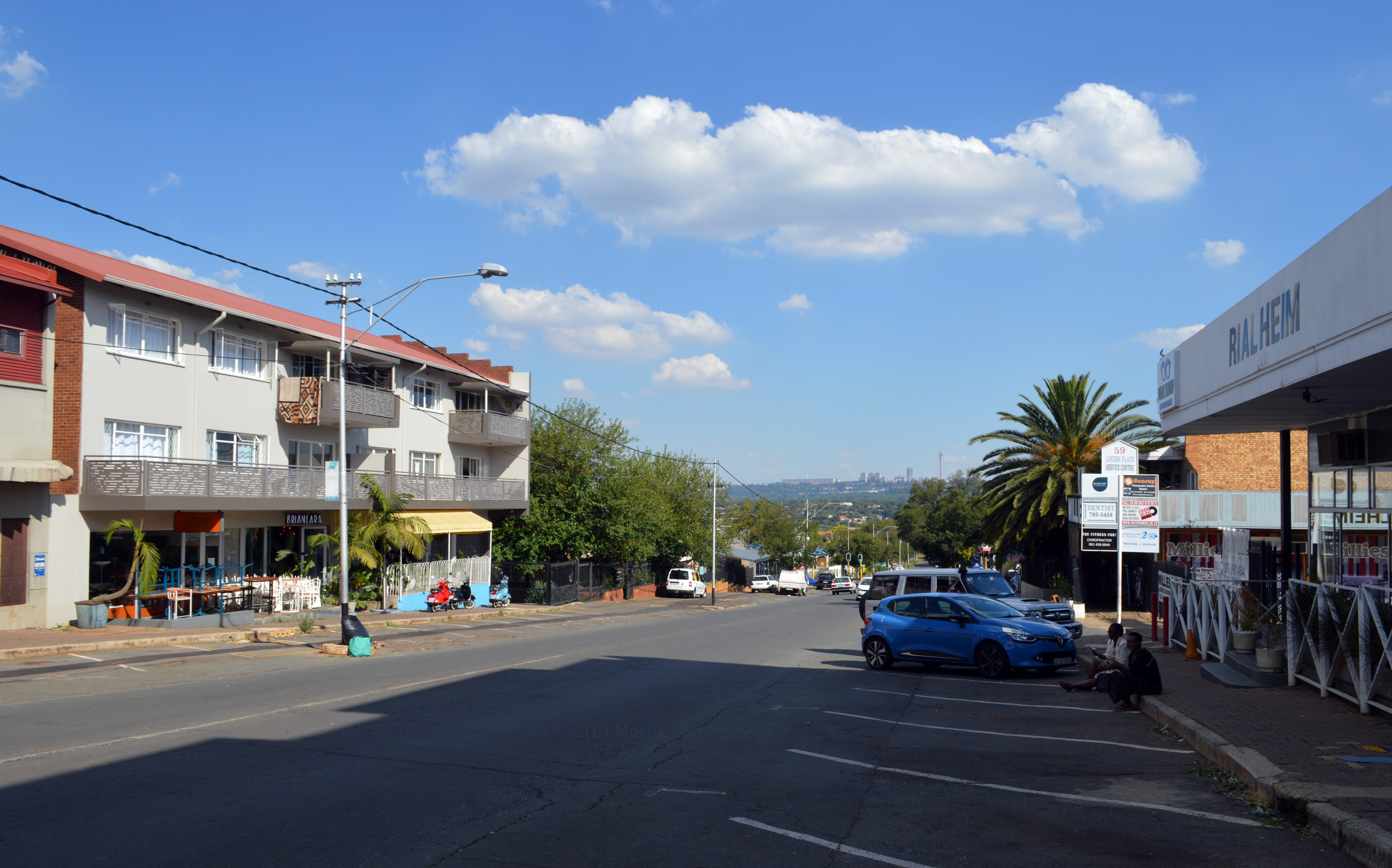
Fourth Avenue, Linden

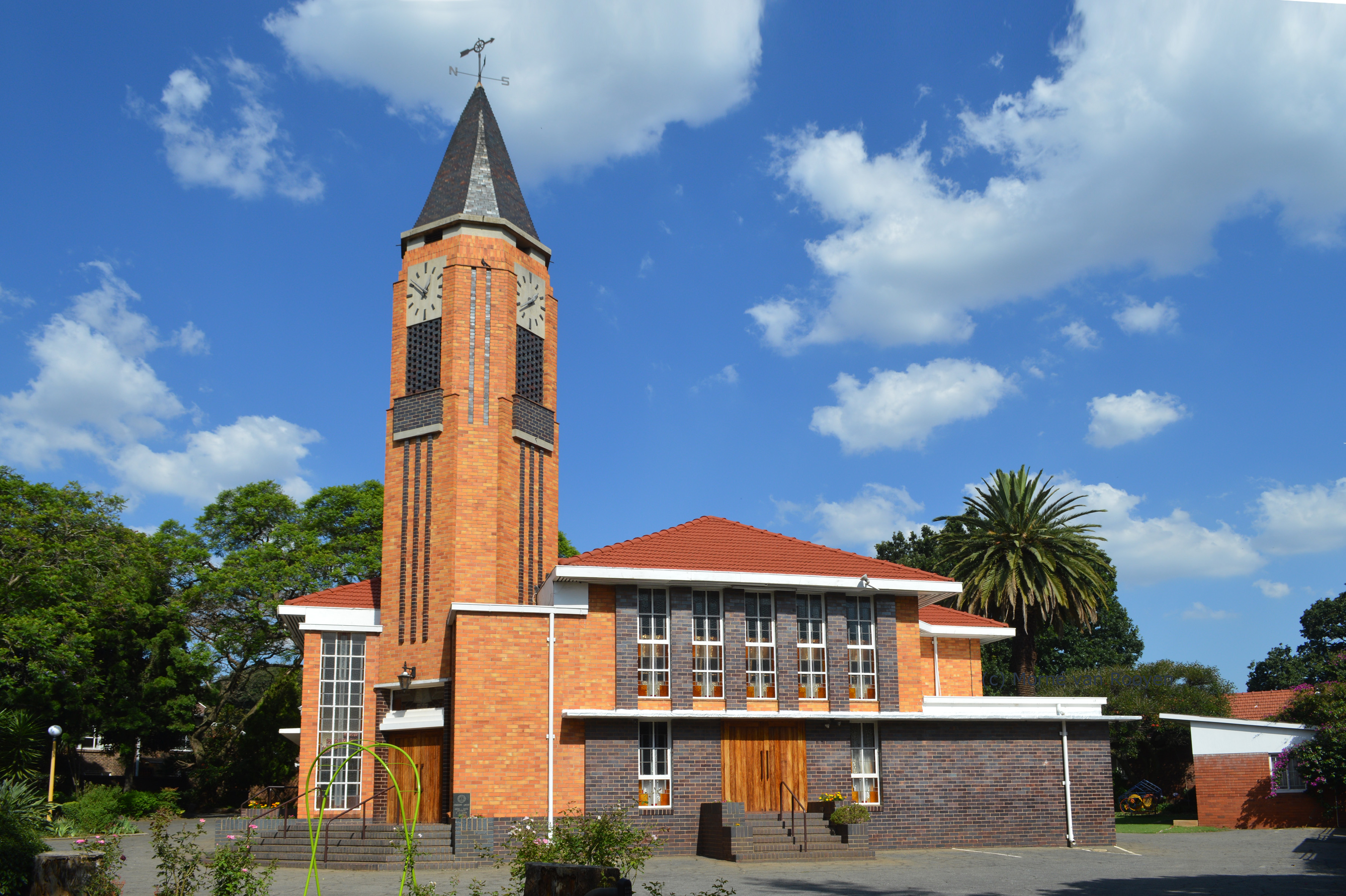
NG Kerk, Linden

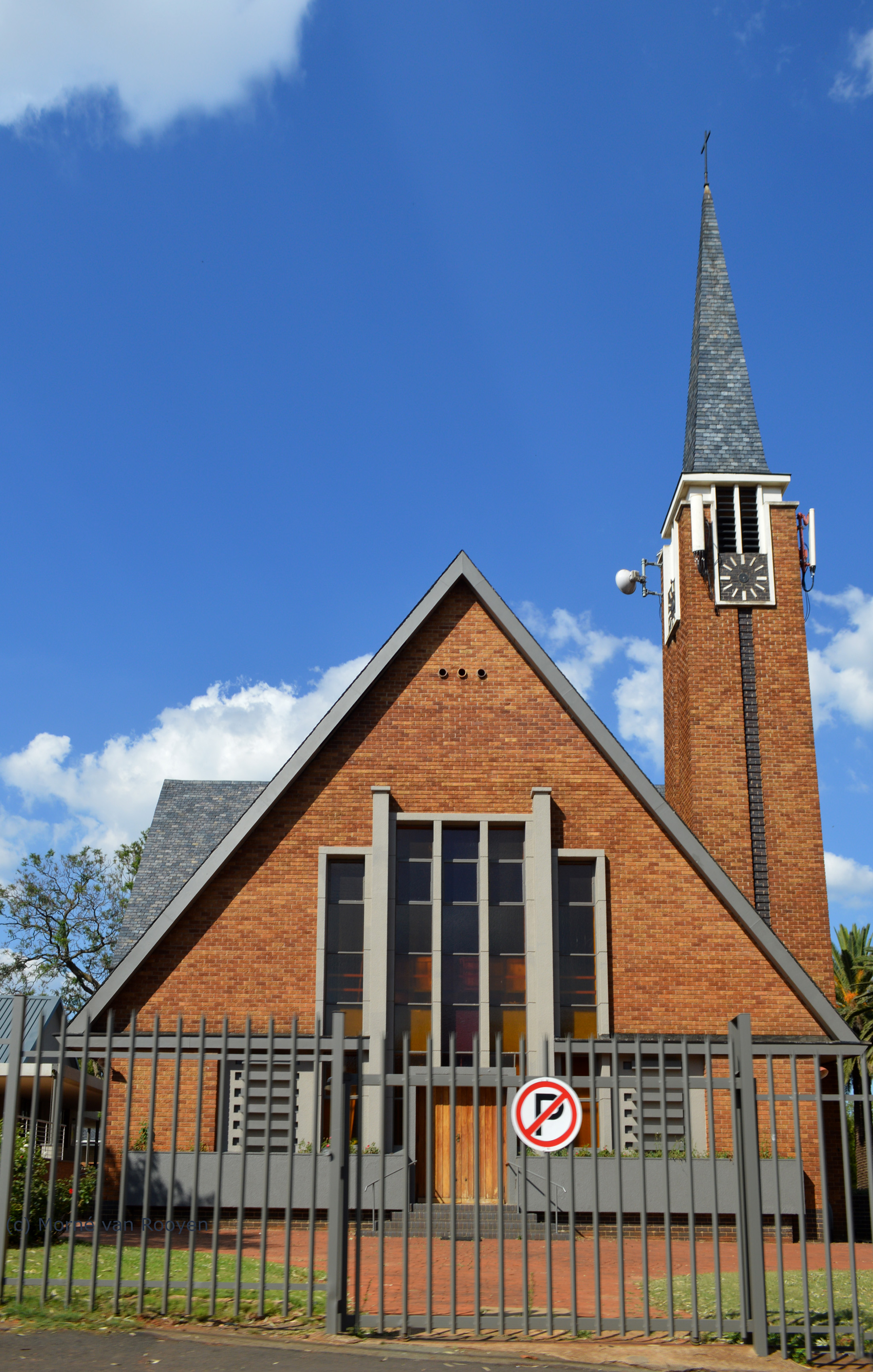
Gereformeerde Kerk, Linden
