= Kya Sands, Johannesburg =

Kya Sands Kya Sand, Dumping, Pipeline
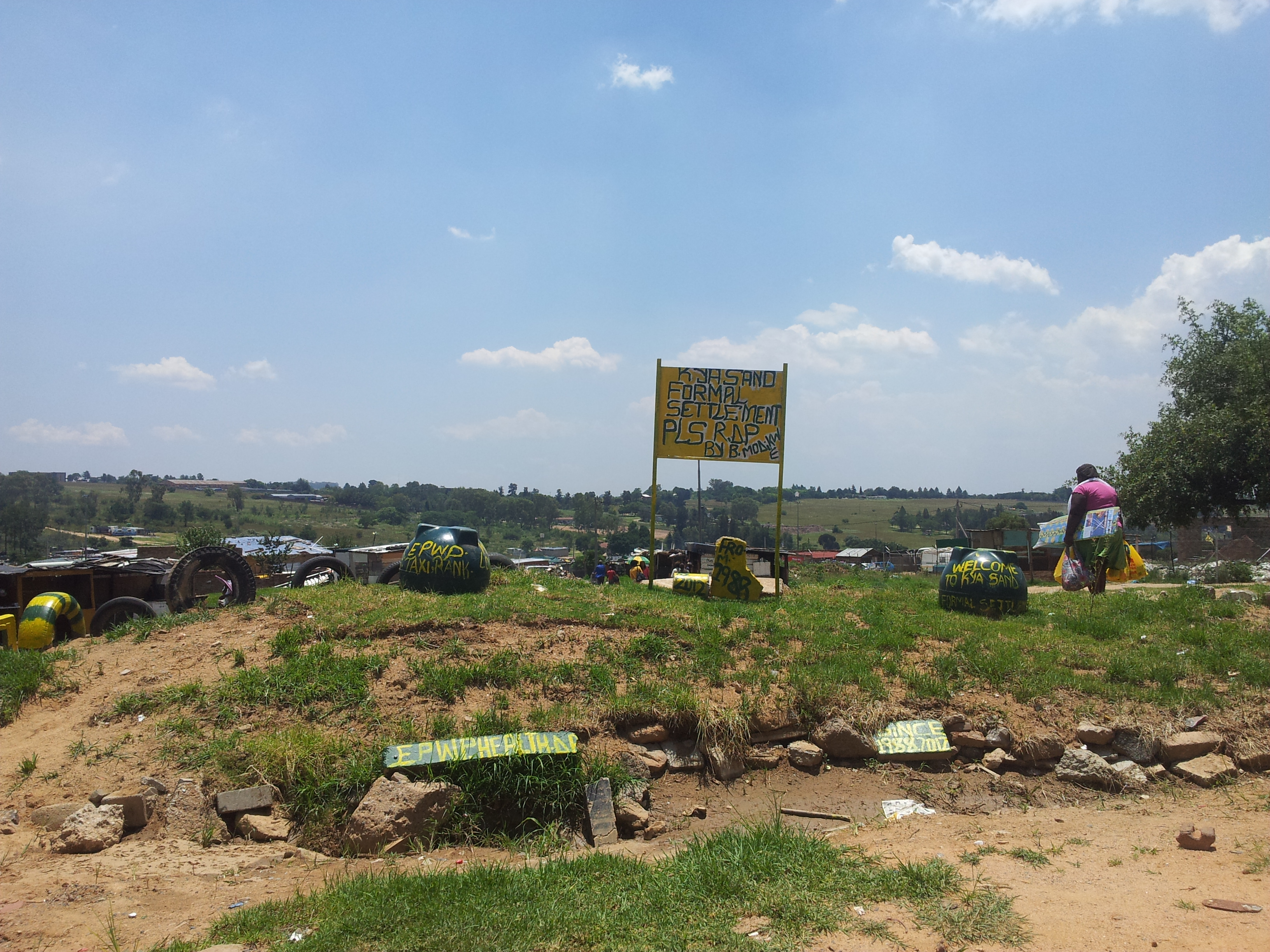
- A community painted sign, reading "Kya Sands Formal Settlement, Please RDP"

- Location within Gauteng Location within South Africa
- Coordinates: 26.024922°S 27.958039°E
- Country: South Africa
- Province: Gauteng
- Municipality: City of Johannesburg
- Main Place: Randburg

Government
  - Type: Wards 96 and 115
  - Ward Councillor: Matome Mafokwane (ward 115) Sbusiso Mthembu (ward 96) (DA)

Area
  - Total: 0.156 km^{2} (0.060 sq mi)

Population (2009)
  - Total: 16,238
  - Density: 104,000/km^{2} (270,000/sq mi)
- Time zone: UTC+2 (SAST)

Kya Sands is an informal settlement located in Region A of the City of Johannesburg.

== Context and Location ==
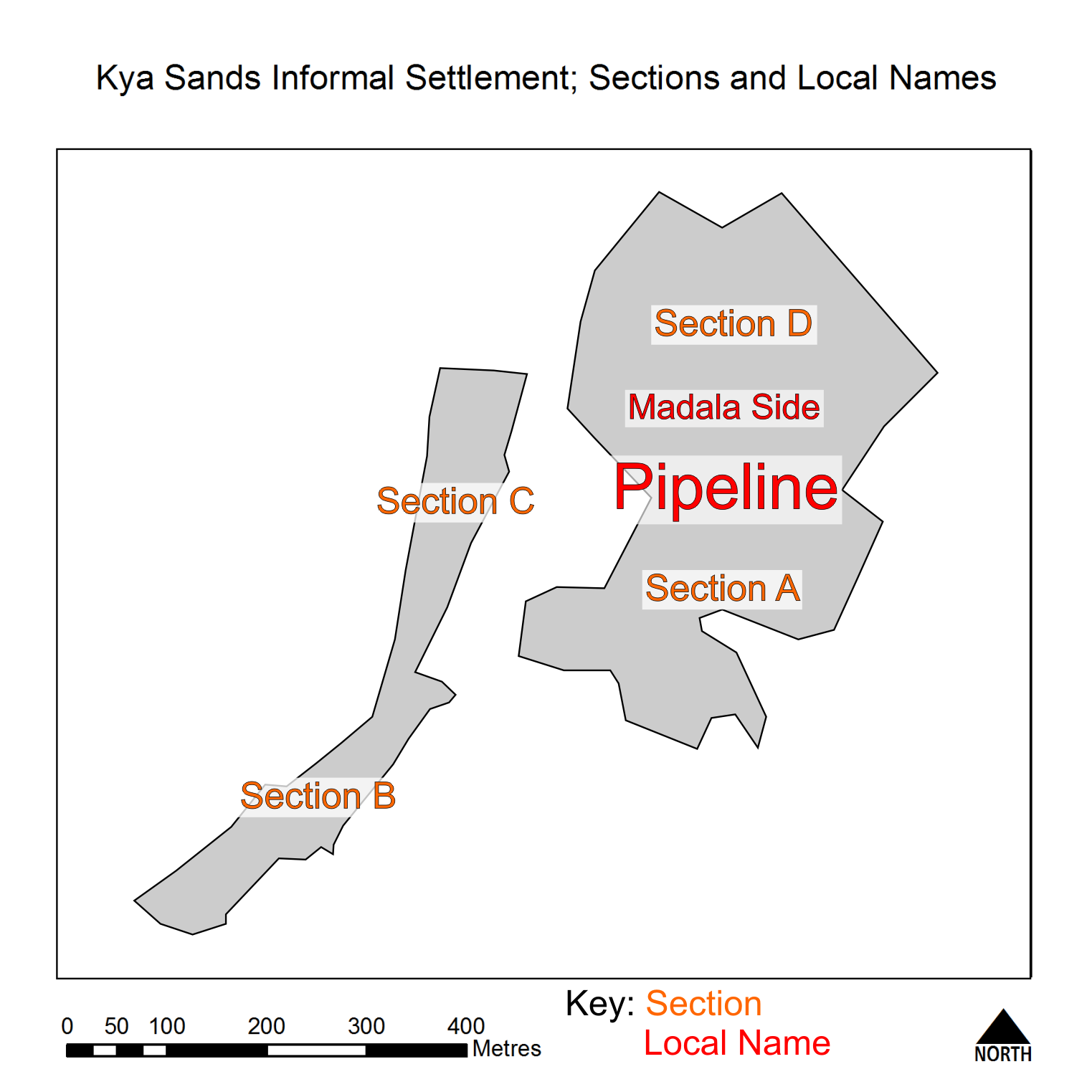
Sections and Local Names in Kya Sands Informal Settlement

Kya Sands is bisected by the North Riding Stream (or Kya Sand Spruit according to some sources).

It is closely bordered by the Kya Sand industrial area to the west, the Bloubosrand residential suburb to the east, the Hoogland industrial area to the south (separated by the old Randburg landfill site) and mostly small holdings to the north.

The settlement occupies both private and government-owned land, lying on 6 different farm and agricultural holdings. The privately owned sections of the settlement lie on the western side of the stream. City of Johannesburg owned land includes sections immediately adjacent to the stream and the property containing the old Randburg Landfill site (Houtkoppen 193-IQ ptn. 46). Portion 51 of the same farm (Houtkoppen I93-IQ), on which a large portion of the settlement lies, is owned by South African National Government and administered by the Gauteng Provincial Government.

=== Name ===
Kya Sands gets its name from the adjacent industrial area, Kya Sand. Other popular names for the settlement include Dumping and Kya Centre. The settlement is also referred to as Kya Sand, Phomolong and Kya Junction by some residents.

=== Sections ===
Kya Sands is made up of a number of sections. The settlement is broken down firstly into Sections A to D. These are defined by government and are used in counting and numbering houses and toilets in the settlement.

Other sections include Pipeline, the whole section of the settlement east of the river, and Madala Side, the northern part of Pipeline.

== History ==
While the exact year of the settlement's formation is disputed, indications are that it started in the early 1990s. Informal houses were initially set up in the area by subcontractors working at the adjacent (now closed) Randburg Landfill site and the Kya Sand and Hoogland industrial areas.

=== Xenophobic attacks, 2008 ===
In the May 2008 xenophobic riots in South Africa, violence against foreign nationals was reported in Kya Sands, with police deployed to the area to try to curb attacks.

== Hazards in the Settlement ==
=== Fire ===
As homes in the settlement are so close together, built from reused materials such as wood and plastic, and that most heating, lighting and cooking is done using open flames, fire poses a significant threat to the residents of Kya Sands.

List of Fires in Kya Sands
Date	Homes Destroyed	Number of Residents Affected	Deaths	Source
5 June 2017	5	-	1	
18 November 2016	14	-	0	
11 November 2015	200	-	0	
11 August 2015	25	70	0	
10 October 2014	500	2000	0	
19 January 2014	70	200	0	
8 September 2013	136	500	2	
14 September 2010	60	100	1	
12 October 2010	8	-	0	
December 2006	110	-	1	

== Government intervention ==
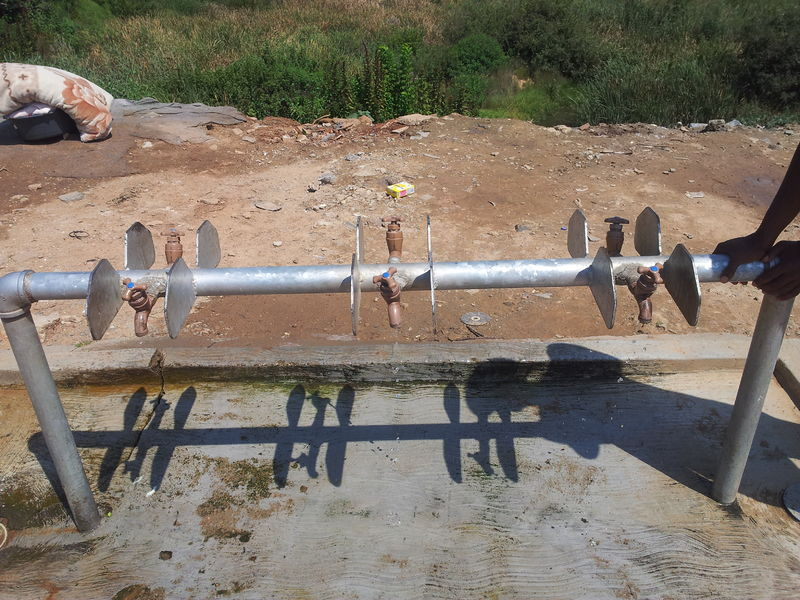
Standpipe in Kya Sands Informal Settlement

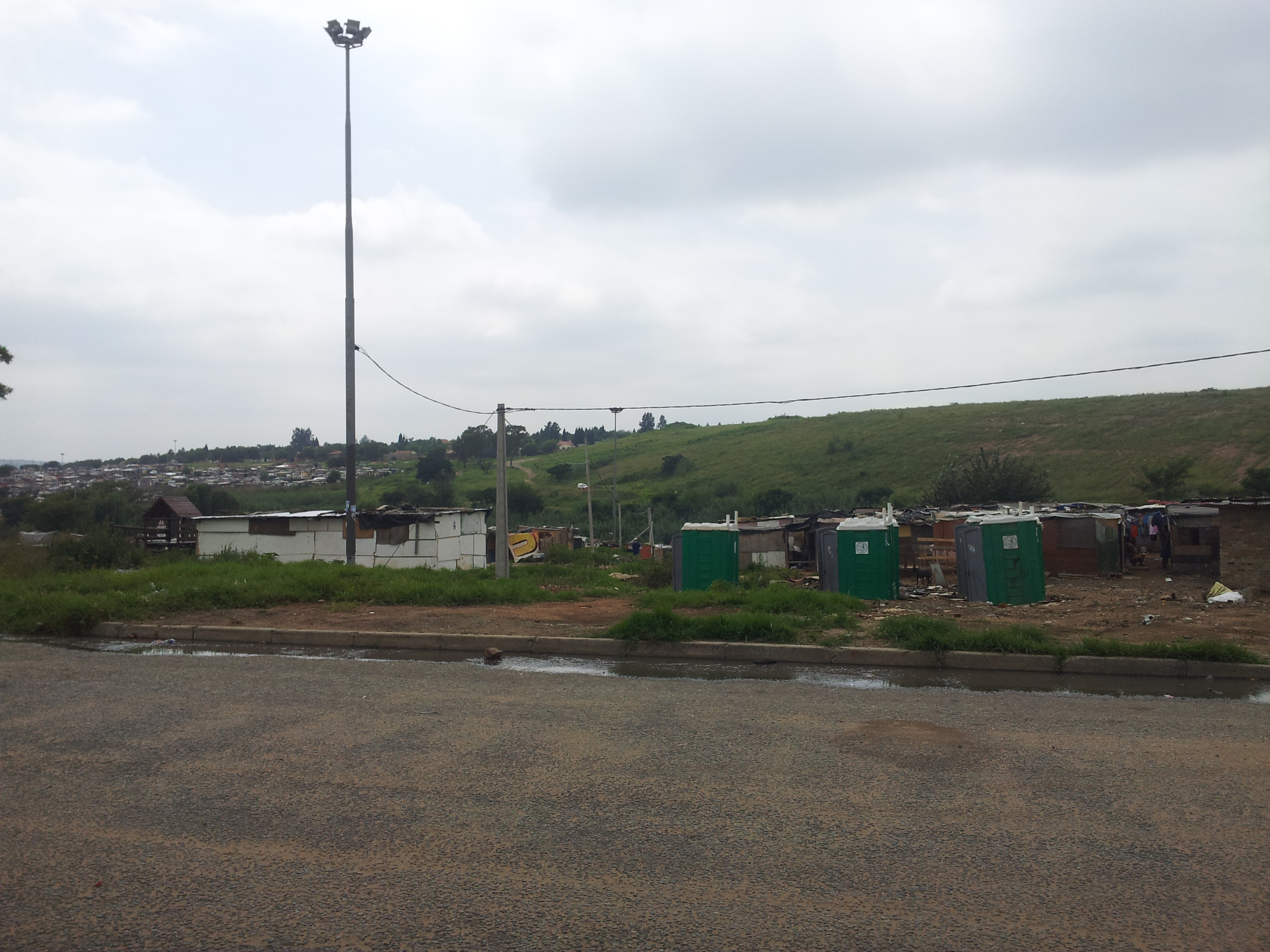
Street Light in Kya Sands

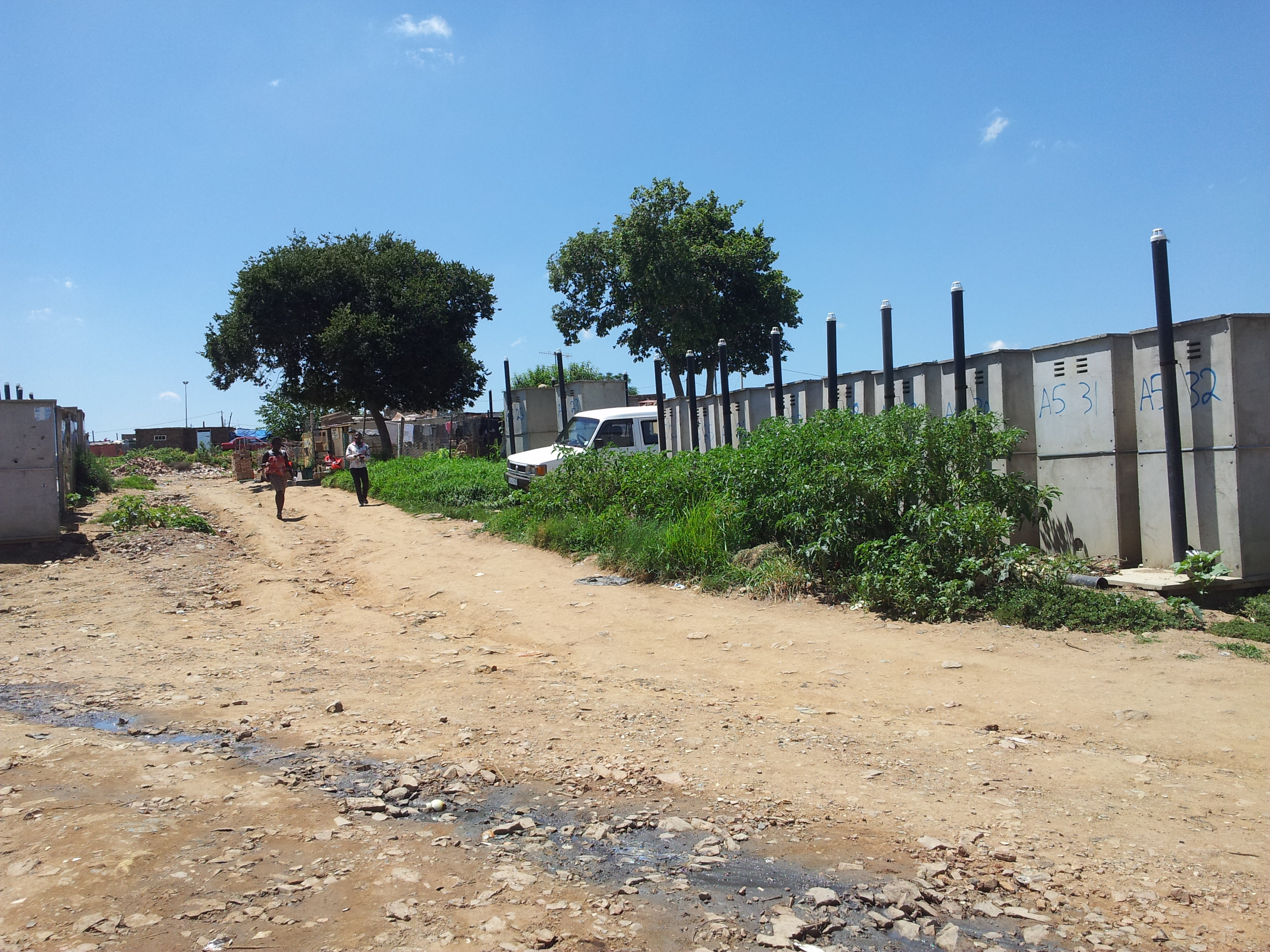
Ventilated Pit Latrines, Kya Sands informal settlement

Local authorities, in the form of the Gauteng Provincial Government and the City of Johannesburg, have proposed a number of plans for long- and short-term intervention in Kya Sands, since 2007. While some short-term plans have been implemented, no long-term action (relocation or in-sutu upgrading) has been taken. On the contrary, the settlement has been extended since 2012, by government relocations to Kya Sands, from other nearby informal settlements.

=== Short-term emergency interventions ===
Between 2006 and 2008, a number of short-term emergency interventions were implemented by the City of Johannesburg. These included the installation of basic services including stand pipes, ventilated pit latrines, and establishing a waste removal service through Pikitup.

Between 2007 and 2008, some 150 households were moved by the City of Johannesburg from the western shore of the river, to section D of the settlement.

=== Bridge construction ===
In response to safety concerns, residents of Kya Sands had regularly called for a bridge to be built across the river. A bridge has been constructed connecting Section C to Pipeline.

== Service Delivery Protests ==
Residents of Kya Sands periodically stage housing and service delivery protests, with the most recent protest taking place on 12 October 2015.
