= Bryanbrink =

- Location within Gauteng Location within South Africa
- Coordinates: 26°4′54″S 28°0′6″E
- Country: South Africa
- Province: Gauteng
- Municipality: City of Johannesburg
- Time zone: UTC+2 (SAST)
- Postal code (street): 2194

Bryanbrink is a suburb of Johannesburg, South Africa. It is located in Region B of the City of Johannesburg Metropolitan Municipality.

Kensington B forms part of ward 104 of the City of Johannesburg represented by Counselor Mike Woods.

The area forms part of the KenBrink Residents Association which represents the interests of residents living in the suburb.
