= Oerder Park =

- Location within Gauteng Location within South Africa
- Coordinates: 26.111°S 28.018°E
- Country: South Africa
- Province: Gauteng
- Municipality: City of Johannesburg
- Time zone: UTC+2 (SAST)

Oerder Park is a suburb of Johannesburg, South Africa. It is located in Region B of the City of Johannesburg Metropolitan Municipality.
