= Bultfontein, Johannesburg =

Bultfontein
- Location within Gauteng Location within South Africa
- Coordinates: 25.965°S 27.922°E
- Country: South Africa
- Province: Gauteng
- Municipality: City of Johannesburg

Area
  - Total: 0.03 km^{2} (0.012 sq mi)

Population (2001)
  - Total: 300
  - Density: 10,000/km^{2} (26,000/sq mi)

Racial makeup (2001)
  - Black African: 99.0%
  - White: 1.0%

First languages (2001)
  - Xhosa: 26.0%
  - Northern Sotho: 26.0%
  - Sotho: 11.0%
  - Tswana: 11.0%
  - Other: TS%
- Time zone: UTC+2 (SAST)
- Postal code (street): 9670
- PO box: 9670
- Area code: 051

Bultfontein is a suburb of Greater Johannesburg, South Africa, just south of Lanseria International Airport. It is located in Region A of the City of Johannesburg Metropolitan Municipality.
