= Johannesburg North =

- Location within Gauteng Location within South Africa
- Coordinates: 26.042°S 27.975°E
- Country: South Africa
- Province: Gauteng
- Municipality: City of Johannesburg
- Main Place: Randburg

Area
  - Total: 1.18 km^{2} (0.46 sq mi)

Population (2011)
  - Total: 2,355
  - Density: 2,000/km^{2} (5,170/sq mi)

Racial makeup (2011)
  - Black African: 26.6%
  - Coloured: 2.1%
  - Indian/Asian: 5.0%
  - White: 65.0%
  - Other: 1.3%

First languages (2011)
  - English: 63.7%
  - Afrikaans: 13.6%
  - Zulu: 4.2%
  - Sotho: 3.7%
  - Other: 14.8%
- Time zone: UTC+2 (SAST)
- Postal code (street): 2188
- PO box: 2153

Johannesburg North is a suburb of Randburg, South Africa. It is located in Region C of the City of Johannesburg Metropolitan Municipality.

== Location ==
It is divided in two by the Witkoppen Road and is situated halfway between Fourways Mall/Monte Casino to the east and Northgate Shopping Centre to the west on the northern outskirts of Randburg.

== History ==
The suburb was largely formed during apartheid as White-Only subsidy housing for new families, but since the collapse of apartheid and the introduction of true democracy, the area has enjoyed a peaceful multi-cultural influx of new residents. The southern side is facing encroaching development of cluster homes, but in majority the houses in this area are free standing, middle income, family homes, with an average yard size of 1000 meters and containing single story homes.

== Amenities ==
A major draw-card for the northern side is The Baron Restaurant. Along the Witkoppen Road banks, new developments have formed, with the southern side featuring an organic lawn nursery, large tree nursery and a ceramic pot centre, 'The Village Green' lifestyle Emporium, whilst the northern side features a recently opened car dealership and a small pub. The Riverwalk Shopping Center, which used to have a supermarket, now only houses a security company, a church and a swimming pool net supplier.

For most residents the most convenient shopping centers are situated in Jukskei Park and Olivedale, otherwise they commute the 5 minutes drive to either of the two nearby large mall zones.
