= Malanshof =

- Location within Gauteng Location within South Africa
- Coordinates: 26.095°S 27.974°E
- Country: South Africa
- Province: Gauteng
- Municipality: City of Johannesburg
- Main Place: Randburg
- Established: 1961

Area
  - Total: 1.22 km^{2} (0.47 sq mi)

Population (2011)
  - Total: 3,555
  - Density: 2,910/km^{2} (7,550/sq mi)

Racial makeup (2011)
  - Black African: 26.6%
  - Coloured: 2.4%
  - Indian/Asian: 11.8%
  - White: 58.1%
  - Other: 1.1%

First languages (2011)
  - English: 56.3%
  - Afrikaans: 22.8%
  - Tsonga: 3.6%
  - Northern Sotho: 2.8%
  - Other: 14.4%
- Time zone: UTC+2 (SAST)
- Postal code (street): 2194

Malanshof is a suburb of Johannesburg, South Africa. An old Randburg municipal suburb, it is tucked between the suburbs of Fontainebleau and Strijdompark. It is located in Region B of the City of Johannesburg Metropolitan Municipality.

== History ==
The suburb was surveyed in 1961 and was originally named Raeburn before it changed and was named after South African prime minister D.F. Malan.
