= Aldara Park =

- Location within Gauteng Location within South Africa
- Coordinates: 26.134°S 27.981°E
- Country: South Africa
- Province: Gauteng
- Municipality: City of Johannesburg
- Main Place: Randburg

Area
  - Total: 0.24 km^{2} (0.093 sq mi)

Population (2011)
  - Total: 490
  - Density: 2,000/km^{2} (5,300/sq mi)

Racial makeup (2011)
  - Black African: 19.6%
  - Coloured: 2.6%
  - Indian/Asian: 0.6%
  - White: 77.2%

First languages (2011)
  - English: 59.4%
  - Afrikaans: 25.3%
  - Northern Sotho: 3.8%
  - Southern Ndebele: 2.1%
  - Other: 9.3%
- Time zone: UTC+2 (SAST)

Aldara Park is a suburb of Johannesburg, South Africa. It is located in Region B of the City of Johannesburg Metropolitan Municipality.
