= Strijdompark =

- Location within Gauteng Location within South Africa
- Coordinates: 26.075°S 27.969°E
- Country: South Africa
- Province: Gauteng
- Municipality: City of Johannesburg
- Main Place: Randburg

Area
  - Total: 1.81 km^{2} (0.70 sq mi)

Population (2011)
  - Total: 408
  - Density: 225/km^{2} (584/sq mi)

Racial makeup (2011)
  - Black African: 15.4%
  - Coloured: 1.7%
  - Indian/Asian: 13.7%
  - White: 68.1%
  - Other: 1.0%

First languages (2011)
  - English: 67.1%
  - Afrikaans: 14.3%
  - Zulu: 3.9%
  - Tswana: 3.4%
  - Other: 11.3%
- Time zone: UTC+2 (SAST)

Strijdompark, also called Strydompark, is a suburb of Randburg, South Africa. It is located in Region B of the City of Johannesburg Metropolitan Municipality. It is named for J. G. Strijdom.
