= Blairgowrie, Gauteng =

Blairgowrie
- Location within Gauteng Location within South Africa
- Coordinates: 26°06′59″S 28°00′34″E
- Country: South Africa
- Province: Gauteng
- Municipality: City of Johannesburg
- Main Place: Randburg
- Established: 1928

Area
  - Total: 4.19 km^{2} (1.62 sq mi)

Population (2011)
  - Total: 12,049
  - Density: 2,880/km^{2} (7,450/sq mi)

Racial makeup (2011)
  - Black African: 24.5%
  - Coloured: 3.1%
  - Indian/Asian: 9.1%
  - White: 61.6%
  - Other: 1.7%

First languages (2011)
  - English: 71.0%
  - Afrikaans: 9.5%
  - Zulu: 4.3%
  - Tswana: 2.9%
  - Other: 12.3%
- Time zone: UTC+2 (SAST)
- Postal code (street): 2194

Blairgowrie is a suburb of Randburg, South Africa situated in Region B of the City of Johannesburg Metropolitan Municipality South Africa. Named after the town of Blairgowrie in Scotland, the suburb is Johannesburg's second-largest by land area.

The suburb has an active community association called the Blairgowrie Community Association.

== History ==
Prior to the discovery of gold on the Witwatersrand in 1886, the future suburb lay on land on one of the original farms that make up Johannesburg, called Klipfontein. The farm was bought by William Grey Rattray in 1890 and renamed it Craighall. In 1928, his daughter would rename part of the land on the farm after her father, Rattray's birthplace, Blairgowrie in Scotland in Britain. The suburb consisted of 406 stands over 56 ha and was established in 1941.
