= Hurlingham, Gauteng =

Hurlingham
- Location within Gauteng Location within South Africa
- Coordinates: 26.104°S 28.029°E
- Country: South Africa
- Province: Gauteng
- Municipality: City of Johannesburg
- Main Place: Sandton
- Established: 1938

Area
  - Total: 2.76 km^{2} (1.07 sq mi)

Population (2011)
  - Total: 3,928
  - Density: 1,420/km^{2} (3,690/sq mi)

Racial makeup (2011)
  - Black African: 28.6%
  - Coloured: 2.0%
  - Indian/Asian: 5.4%
  - White: 62.4%
  - Other: 1.5%

First languages (2011)
  - English: 70.1%
  - Afrikaans: 7.2%
  - Zulu: 5.8%
  - Northern Sotho: 2.6%
  - Other: 14.3%
- Time zone: UTC+2 (SAST)
- Postal code (street): 2196
- PO box: 2070

Hurlingham is a suburb of Johannesburg, South Africa. Hurlingham has traditionally been an upmarket residential suburb. This residential suburb is located just outside the Sandton central business district. It is located in Region B of the City of Johannesburg Metropolitan Municipality.

== History ==
The land was proclaimed as a suburb on 25 May 1938 and is named after an English polo-field. The land is situated on a portion of an old Witwatersrand farm called Zandfontein.
