= Broadacres, Gauteng =

Broadacres
- Location within Gauteng Location within South Africa
- Coordinates: 25°59′38″S 27°59′29″E
- Country: South Africa
- Province: Gauteng
- Municipality: City of Johannesburg
- Main Place: Sandton

Area
  - Total: 1.41 km^{2} (0.54 sq mi)

Population (2011)
  - Total: 2,598
  - Density: 1,840/km^{2} (4,770/sq mi)

Racial makeup (2011)
  - Black African: 36.9%
  - Coloured: 2.9%
  - Indian/Asian: 8.9%
  - White: 50.3%
  - Other: 1.0%

First languages (2011)
  - English: 64.8%
  - Afrikaans: 8.7%
  - Zulu: 5.8%
  - Sotho: 3.3%
  - Other: 17.3%
- Time zone: UTC+2 (SAST)
- Postal code (street): 2021
- Website: www.broadacres.com

Broadacres is a suburb of Sandton, South Africa. It is located in Region A of the City of Johannesburg Metropolitan Municipality.
