= Buccleuch, Gauteng =

Buccleuch
- Location within Gauteng Location within South Africa
- Coordinates: 26.050°S 28.104°E
- Country: South Africa
- Province: Gauteng
- Municipality: City of Johannesburg
- Main Place: Sandton
- Established: 1938

Area
  - Total: 3.83 km^{2} (1.48 sq mi)

Population (2011)
  - Total: 10,465
  - Density: 2,730/km^{2} (7,080/sq mi)

Racial makeup (2011)
  - Black African: 47.8%
  - Coloured: 4.9%
  - Indian/Asian: 26.7%
  - White: 18.7%
  - Other: 2.0%

First languages (2011)
  - English: 61.6%
  - Zulu: 8.7%
  - Xhosa: 5.3%
  - Afrikaans: 4.7%
  - Other: 19.7%
- Time zone: UTC+2 (SAST)
- Postal code (street): 2090
- PO box: 2066

Buccleuch is a suburb of Sandton, in the Gauteng province of South Africa.

== History ==
The suburb of Buccleuch stands on one of the old Witwatersrand farms called Waterfal. The farmland had the Jukskei River flowing through it and after the creation of the city of Johannesburg the road to Pretoria, later known as the Old Pretoria Road, also passed through. The farm of 7,030 acres was purchased by John Alexander Gibson, a British immigrant, who owned a coach transport business. The farm was used as a rest area for his businesses horses and mules.

When those animals were no longer used as transport the farmland was kept until his death in 1928 when it was divided amongst seven heirs and was sold. A son, Frederick Chapman Gibson, kept 1000 acres but would sell the eastern portion to AECI the owners of the Modderfontein Dynamite factory in 1938 and the portion left, surveyed as a township divided into 170 stands of 3 to 5 acres with 50 stands on the Jukskei River selling for £475 and up. The suburb itself was named after Frederick's family friend the Duke of Buccleuch and the street names after family and friends. Originally spelt Buccleugh it obtained its current name on 23 September 1992.
