= Bloubosrand =

- Location within Gauteng Location within South Africa
- Coordinates: 26°1′36″S 27°58′0″E
- Country: South Africa
- Province: Gauteng
- Municipality: City of Johannesburg
- Main Place: Randburg

Area
  - Total: 2.36 km^{2} (0.91 sq mi)

Population (2011)
  - Total: 10,879
  - Density: 4,610/km^{2} (11,900/sq mi)

Racial makeup (2011)
  - Black African: 85.9%
  - Coloured: 1.8%
  - Indian/Asian: 2.5%
  - White: 9.2%
  - Other: 0.6%

First languages (2011)
  - English: 15.8%
  - Zulu: 15.2%
  - Tsonga: 11.2%
  - Northern Sotho: 10.7%
  - Other: 47.1%
- Time zone: UTC+2 (SAST)
- Postal code (street): 2188
- PO box: 2153

Bloubosrand (/ˈbloʊbɒsrʌnd/ BLOH-boss-rund) is a suburb northwest of Johannesburg, South Africa. It is located in Region A of the City of Johannesburg Metropolitan Municipality.
