= Fontainebleau, Gauteng =

Fontainebleau
- Location within Gauteng Location within South Africa
- Coordinates: 26.1037°S 27.9766°E
- Country: South Africa
- Province: Gauteng
- Municipality: City of Johannesburg
- Main Place: Randburg

Area
  - Total: 1.72 km^{2} (0.66 sq mi)

Population (2011)
  - Total: 2,826
  - Density: 1,640/km^{2} (4,260/sq mi)

Racial makeup (2011)
  - Black African: 32.4%
  - Coloured: 2.1%
  - Indian/Asian: 4.9%
  - White: 59.9%
  - Other: 0.8%

First languages (2011)
  - English: 45.1%
  - Afrikaans: 29.1%
  - Zulu: 5.8%
  - Southern Ndebele: 3.3%
  - Other: 16.7%
- Time zone: UTC+2 (SAST)
- Postal code (street): 2194
- PO box: 2032

Fontainebleau is a suburb of Randburg, South Africa. It is located in Region E of the City of Johannesburg Metropolitan Municipality.

== History ==
Named after the famous French palace called Fontainebleau by the surveyor of the suburb called W.H. Auret Pritchard after a visit to France.
