= Northcliff =

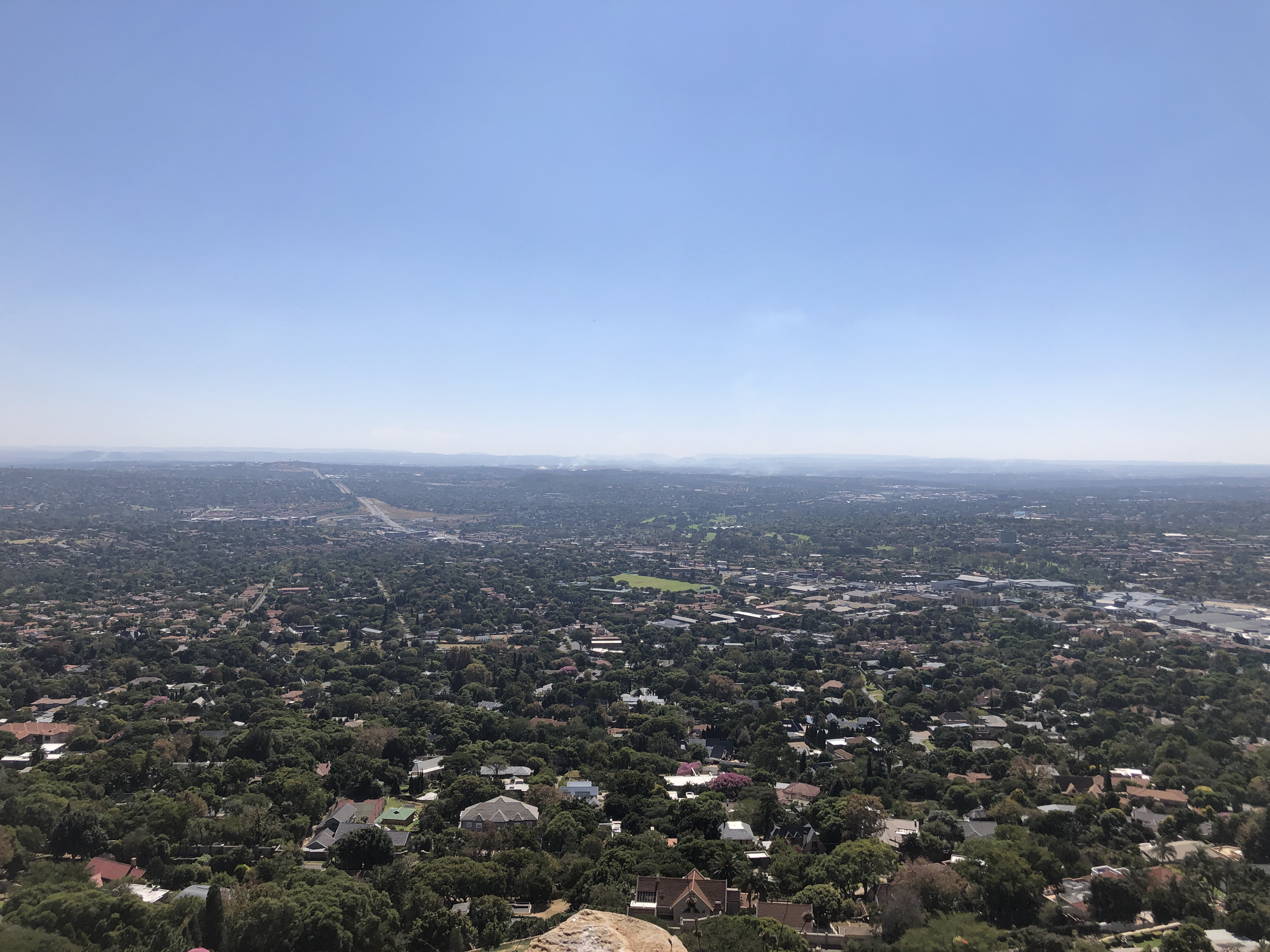
- Northcliff seen from Northcliff Hill

- Location within Gauteng Location within South Africa
- Coordinates: 26°8′46″S 27°58′12″E
- Country: South Africa
- Province: Gauteng
- Municipality: City of Johannesburg
- Main Place: Johannesburg
- Established: 1934

Area
  - Total: 9.06 km^{2} (3.50 sq mi)

Population (2011)
  - Total: 14,664
  - Density: 1,620/km^{2} (4,190/sq mi)

Racial makeup (2011)
  - Black African: 23.0%
  - Coloured: 4.9%
  - Indian/Asian: 7.5%
  - White: 63.5%
  - Other: 1.2%

First languages (2011)
  - English: 55.1%
  - Afrikaans: 25.4%
  - Zulu: 4.1%
  - Tswana: 2.9%
  - Other: 12.5%
- Time zone: UTC+2 (SAST)
- Postal code (street): 2195
- PO box: 2115

Northcliff is a wealthy residential suburb of Johannesburg, South Africa. The suburb is located on Northcliff Ridge which provides views to both the north and the south. Northcliff's huge homes are nestled around a steep incline of the hill, and on the foot of Northcliff borders the suburbs of Fairland, Blackheath, Cresta and Berario. Recently some streets have been secured with boom gates. It is located in Region B of the City of Johannesburg Metropolitan Municipality.

== History ==
The suburb is situated on part of an old Witwatersrand farm called Waterval. It was established on 3 October 1934 by entrepreneur, Fred Cohen and named after the northerly ridge. Cohen built a palatial home in the suburb, designed by architect M.J. Harris and which also has a ballroom.

== Geography ==
=== Topography ===
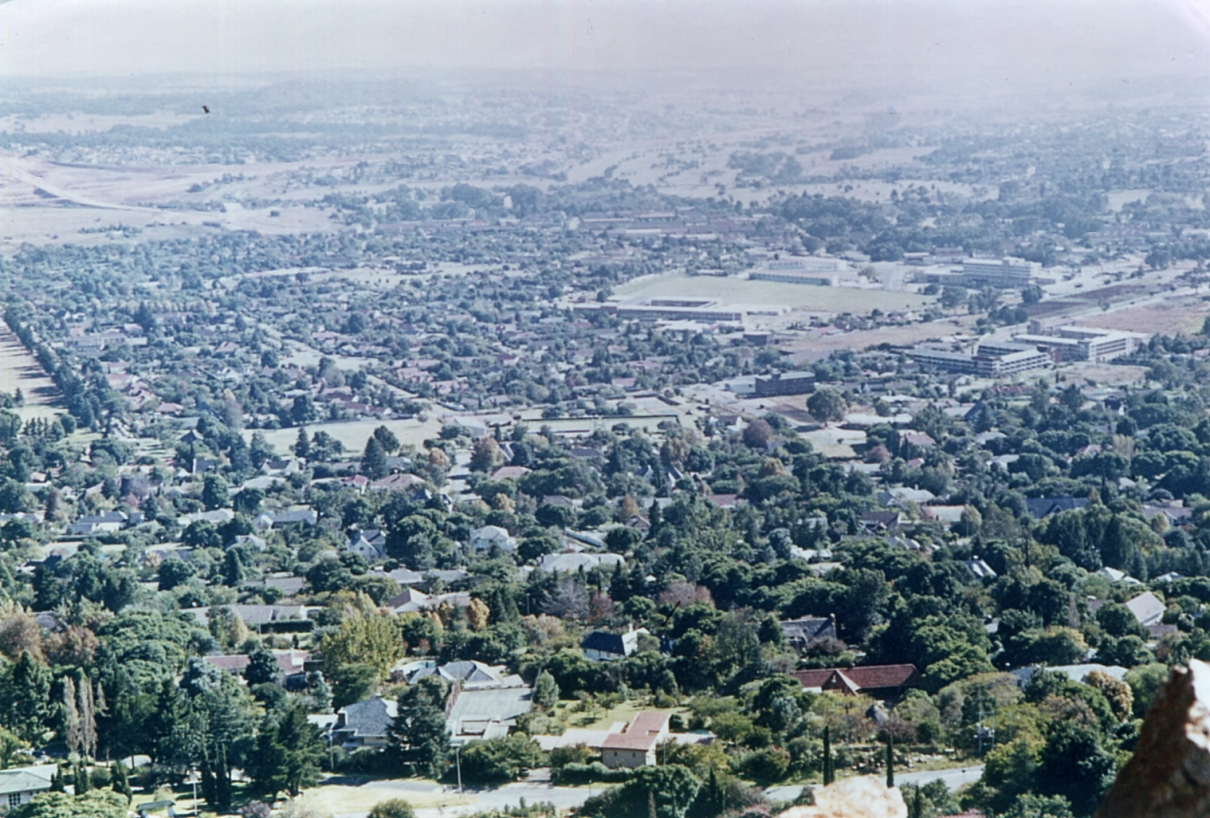
View from Northcliff Ridge (1978)

Northcliff Hill (also known as Aasvoëlkop (Vulture Ridge) due to the cliffs being predominantly inhabited by these birds of prey before being urbanised) is believed to have been populated by humans for over 250,000 years. At 1807 metres, the ridge is the second-highest point in Johannesburg, being one metre lower than Observatory Ridge. It has three vegetation zones and is inhabited by many different animals.

== Economy ==
=== Retail ===
Northcliff is served by Cresta Shopping Centre, one of the largest malls in Johannesburg which is located on the border of Northcliff in the suburb of Cresta. Many other smaller suburban shopping complexes are within easy access, for example Northcliff Corner, The Verdi Centre, Heathway Square and Home Living Design Centre.

== Education ==
While actually located in Blackheath, the suburb gives its name to Northcliff High School and Northcliff Primary School.

== Infrastructure ==
=== Health systems ===
Marang House, a home for seriously ill children, is based in Northcliff.

== Notable residents ==
- Leanne Manas, broadcast journalist, author
- Lira, singer, songwriter
- Fezile Mpela, actor, television producer
- Frans Marx, actor, writer, television producer, director
