= Blackheath, Gauteng =

Blackheath
- Location within Gauteng Location within South Africa Location within Africa
- Coordinates: 26°08′S 27°58′E
- Country: South Africa
- Province: Gauteng
- Municipality: City of Johannesburg
- Main Place: Johannesburg
- Established: 1903

Area
  - Total: 1.02 km^{2} (0.39 sq mi)

Population (2011)
  - Total: 2,407
  - Density: 2,360/km^{2} (6,110/sq mi)

Racial makeup (2011)
  - Black African: 42.2%
  - Coloured: 4.1%
  - Indian/Asian: 10.1%
  - White: 41.5%
  - Other: 2.0%

First languages (2011)
  - English: 46.2%
  - Afrikaans: 15.9%
  - Zulu: 8.2%
  - Tswana: 5.3%
  - Other: 24.5%
- Time zone: UTC+2 (SAST)
- Postal code (street): 2195

Blackheath is a suburb of Johannesburg, South Africa. It is located in Region B of the City of Johannesburg Metropolitan Municipality. Situated north-west of the Johannesburg CBD, it is north of the suburb of Northcliff.

== History ==
The suburb originated in 1903 with 277 stands laid out over 84.5ha. It is named after Blackheath in London.
