= Northgate, South Africa =

Northgate
- Location within Gauteng Location within South Africa
- Coordinates: 26.06°S 27.947°E
- Country: South Africa
- Province: Gauteng
- Municipality: City of Johannesburg
- Main Place: Randburg

Area
  - Total: 1.22 km^{2} (0.47 sq mi)

Population (2011)
  - Total: 3,845
  - Density: 3,150/km^{2} (8,160/sq mi)

Racial makeup (2011)
  - Black African: 63.4%
  - Coloured: 3.0%
  - Indian/Asian: 12.6%
  - White: 20.3%
  - Other: 0.7%

First languages (2011)
  - English: 52.7%
  - Zulu: 8.9%
  - Xhosa: 7.7%
  - Afrikaans: 7.0%
  - Other: 23.7%
- Time zone: UTC+2 (SAST)

Northgate is a suburb of Randburg, Gauteng Province, South Africa. Northgate contains a major shopping mall (Northgate Shopping Centre).
