= Jukskei Park =

- Location within Gauteng Location within South Africa
- Coordinates: 26.038°S 27.981°E
- Country: South Africa
- Province: Gauteng
- Municipality: City of Johannesburg
- Main Place: Randburg

Area
  - Total: 2.53 km^{2} (0.98 sq mi)

Population (2011)
  - Total: 5,454
  - Density: 2,160/km^{2} (5,580/sq mi)

Racial makeup (2011)
  - Black African: 17.9%
  - Coloured: 1.8%
  - Indian/Asian: 3.7%
  - White: 75.1%
  - Other: 1.5%

First languages (2011)
  - English: 75.3%
  - Afrikaans: 10.3%
  - Zulu: 3.7%
  - Tswana: 1.7%
  - Other: 9.0%
- Time zone: UTC+2 (SAST)
- Postal code (street): 2188
- Area code: 011

Jukskei Park is a suburb of Johannesburg, South Africa. It is located in Region C of the City of Johannesburg Metropolitan Municipality.
