= Olivedale, Gauteng =

Olivedale
- Location within Gauteng Location within South Africa
- Coordinates: 26.058°S 27.976°E
- Country: South Africa
- Province: Gauteng
- Municipality: City of Johannesburg
- Main Place: Randburg

Area
  - Total: 2.21 km^{2} (0.85 sq mi)

Population (2011)
  - Total: 3,777
  - Density: 1,710/km^{2} (4,430/sq mi)

Racial makeup (2011)
  - Black African: 20.4%
  - Coloured: 2.2%
  - Indian/Asian: 8.3%
  - White: 67.9%
  - Other: 1.1%

First languages (2011)
  - English: 71.2%
  - Afrikaans: 14.4%
  - Zulu: 3.2%
  - Tswana: 3.2%
  - Other: 8.0%
- Time zone: UTC+2 (SAST)
- Postal code (street): 2188
- PO box: 2158
- Area code: 010

Olivedale is a suburb of Johannesburg, South Africa. It is located in Region C of the City of Johannesburg Metropolitan Municipality.

Olivedale is a small suburb in the greater Randburg area in the City of Johannesburg. It originated as a farm, Olivedale, and the original farmhouse, along with the original farm windmill, still exists today. The windmill now forms part of the area's main nursery school.
