= Ferndale, Gauteng =

Ferndale
- Location within Gauteng Location within South Africa
- Coordinates: 26°4′56″S 27°58′57″E
- Country: South Africa
- Province: Gauteng
- Municipality: City of Johannesburg
- Main Place: Randburg
- Established: 1909

Area
  - Total: 7.72 km^{2} (2.98 sq mi)

Population (2011)
  - Total: 19 373
  - Density: 2.5/km^{2} (6.4/sq mi)

Racial makeup (2011)
  - Black African: 51.7%
  - Coloured: 4.1%
  - Indian/Asian: 14.7%
  - White: 28.2%
  - Other: 1.3%

First languages (2011)
  - English: 49.0%
  - Afrikaans: 11.8%
  - Zulu: 8.6%
  - Tswana: 5.3%
  - Other: 25.3%
- Time zone: UTC+2 (SAST)
- Postal code (street): 2194
- PO box: 2160

Ferndale is a suburb of Randburg, South Africa. It is located in Region B of the City of Johannesburg Metropolitan Municipality. The area is very central and has a good mix of residential homes, shops and commercial property.

== History ==
The suburb originates from around 1909 and the suburb's name originates from ferns in a valley.

== Businesses ==
Ferndale is home to Multichoice with offices on either side of Bram Fischer Drive between Republic Road and Grove Street.

Ferndale on Republic is the new name of the old Randburg Waterfront and later known as the Brightwater Commons. Originally opened in 1996, the Randburg Waterfront was a wharf style entertainment venue with a large man-made lake at the centre. One of the biggest attractions at the centre was the musical fountain, with choreographed displays to many different musical favourites.

After the decline of the Randburg Waterfront, the centre underwent a major refurbishment and re-opened at The Brightwater Commons in 2008. The man-made lake was replaced with a much smaller pond and a smaller version of the musical fountain. The rest of the inside area was converted to a garden with trees, with a flea market at the centre. This enjoyed mediocre success, and was sold again, now being re-branded as Ferndale on Republic. The "Commons" in the middle was removed completely and replaced by a large parking lot. Some buildings have been demolished and an additional extension has been built in the old parking lot towards Republic Road.

== Residents' associations ==
Ferndale is divided over two SAPS precincts and has thus been covered by two different residents' associations.

Ferndale south of Republic Road is covered by Linden SAPS and is under the Ferndale Ridge Residents Group.

Ferndale north of Republic Road is covered by Randburg SAPS and is under the Ferndale Residents Association.
