= Randburg =

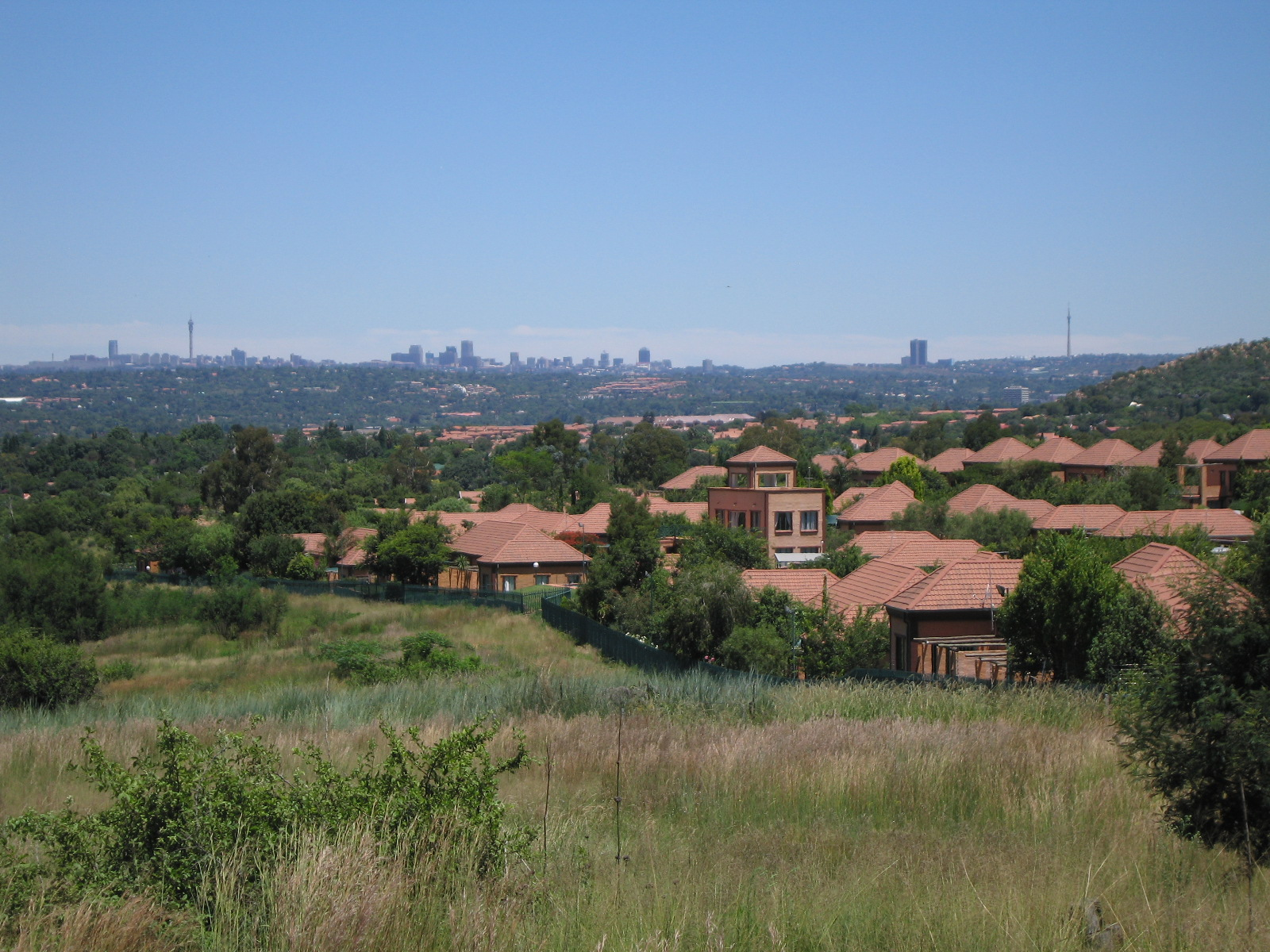
- Beverley Gardens, Randburg

- Location within Gauteng Location within South Africa Location within Africa
- Coordinates: 26°5′37″S 28°0′23″E
- Country: South Africa
- Province: Gauteng
- Municipality: City of Johannesburg

Area
  - Total: 167.98 km^{2} (64.86 sq mi)

Population (2011)
  - Total: 337,053
  - Density: 2,006.5/km^{2} (5,196.8/sq mi)

Racial makeup (2011)
  - Black African: 36.8%
  - Coloured: 11.6%
  - Indian/Asian: 7.5%
  - White: 45.7%
  - Other: 1.5%

First languages (2011)
  - English: 52.0%
  - Afrikaans: 17.6%
  - Zulu: 6.6%
  - Tswana: 4.1%
  - Other: 19.6%
- Time zone: UTC+2 (SAST)
- Postal code (street): 2194
- PO box: 2125
- Area code: 011

Randburg is an area located in the Gauteng province of South Africa. Formerly a separate municipality, its administration devolved to the newly created City of Johannesburg Metropolitan Municipality, along with neighbouring Sandton and Roodepoort, in the late 1990s. During the transitional period of 1996–2000, Randburg was part of the Northern Metropolitan Local Council (MLC).

== History ==
=== Early history of Randburg ===
The earliest known inhabitants of the area now called Randburg were indigenous tribes who roamed the open veld. Evidence of their Iron Age craftsmanship, including tools and pottery, can still be found on some of the local koppies (small hills). However, much about their culture and history remains undocumented and largely unknown.

=== The Boer Settlements ===
Randburg's recorded history began in the mid-19th century when Boer pioneers settled four farms in the area: Klipfontein, Driefontein, Olievenhoutspoort, and Boskop. These farms were later subdivided among the sons of the original farmers, following the tradition of the time. Driefontein, one of the largest farms, originally stretched from the northern boundary of Bryanston to present-day Braamfontein, eventually being divided into nine plots.

One of the plots was purchased by Charles Rocher, a Frenchman from Bordeaux, who named his section after his hometown. Rocher was an early pioneer of Cape deciduous fruit farming in the Transvaal, and remnants of his orchards can still be found on some of the older plots in the area. Another portion of the Boskop farm was bought by Dale Lace, a well-known Rand entrepreneur, who converted a farmhouse into a country residence. This home, restored by Tom Kelly in 1929 and renamed "Hy-Many," is currently under consideration for designation as a National Monument.

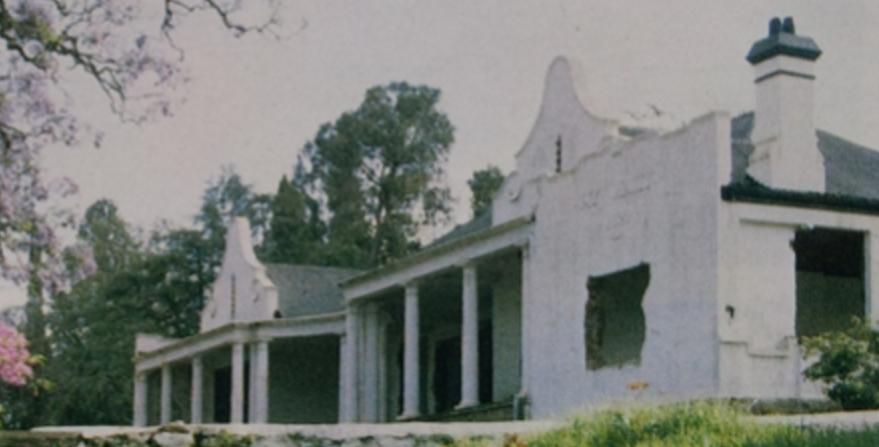
Hy-Many

=== Randburg and the Gold Rush ===
The discovery of gold in the region brought significant attention to Randburg. Wealthy English investors, such as Abe Bailey, saw the area as a prime opportunity for investment. Streets like Carlton Road, Church Street, and Pritchard Street were established in what was once open veld. The abundance of wildlife, particularly antelopes and birds, also made Randburg a popular hunting destination during this period. The name "Hunters Hill" is a reminder of these times when game was plentiful in the area.

=== The Great Depression and Development ===
The Great Depression of 1928-1934 and a severe drought that lasted four years led to a significant influx of platteland (rural) farmers into Randburg. Many of these new settlers preferred the rural environment and chose to build their homes in the area, often without any state assistance. Life in Randburg was simple and self-sufficient, with an abundance of food available locally.

By 1950, Randburg's population had grown to fewer than 9,000 inhabitants. However, rapid development followed, and by 1960, the population had expanded, new townships were established, and the local newspaper "Noord-Nuus" began publication. As businesses flourished, the question of municipal status arose—whether Randburg should remain independent or be incorporated into Johannesburg. In 1959, following a public competition, the name "Randburg" was chosen, and the area was inaugurated as a municipality.

=== Autonomy and the Establishment of Randburg ===
The establishment of Randburg as an independent town was driven by a self-appointed committee led by Robert van Tonder, a dynamic leader and District Secretary of the National Party. In 1956, van Tonder founded the Dorpsraadaksiekomitee with the aim of creating a town with an Afrikaans character, distinct from the predominantly English Johannesburg, which he viewed as politically left-leaning. The committee's petition for independence was supported by the Lorentz Commission, which, after considering the evidence, recommended the establishment of Randburg as a separate town. Randburg officially came into being on July 1, 1959.

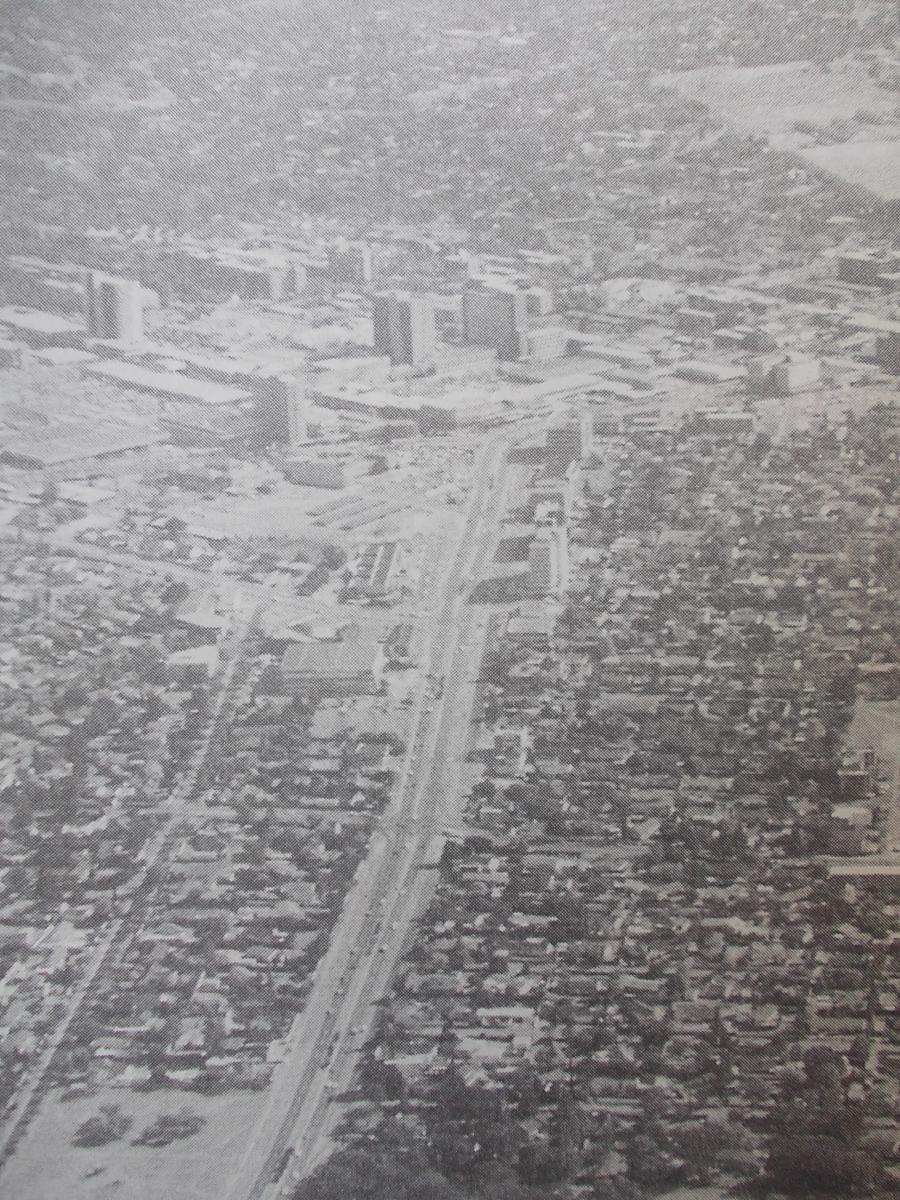
Early photo of Randburg

=== The Path to Autonomy ===
During the process of establishing Randburg's autonomy, local elections were held in the North-Western Johannesburg Local Area Committee (LAC). The enthusiasm for independence was high in Randburg, contrasting with the apathy in other areas of Northern and North-Eastern Johannesburg. The success of Randburg's residents in securing independence inspired other areas north of Johannesburg to push for greater autonomy.

=== Conflict with the Provincial Authorities ===
In the 1950s, tensions arose between the Provincial Administration and the Peri-Urban Areas Health Board (PUAHB), which had jurisdiction over Randburg. The Board, responsible for providing services and maintaining sanitary conditions, was reluctant to relinquish control over Randburg, fearing that it would become a financially insecure and poorly managed town. Despite the Board's opposition, the Province supported the move towards local autonomy, leading to Randburg's eventual independence.

The Lorentz Commission's findings and the Province's determination to promote autonomy marked a turning point in the development of Randburg, paving the way for its growth into a thriving, self-governing municipality. By 1972, the Randburg Town Council had established guidelines for the development of residential areas, the central business district (CBD), and industrial zones, setting the stage for the area's future growth and prosperity.

Although economically linked to Johannesburg, residents chose to create their own town council. The name Randburg was chosen in a competition, and is derived from the South African Rand currency, which was introduced at around the same time that the new municipality was established in 1959. Like other affluent northern suburbs of Johannesburg, the area was regarded as relatively liberal and elected Democratic Party members of parliament. As Apartheid ended, it became more supportive of F. W. de Klerk's reform-minded National Party. In 1962, it became a municipality.

The resident demographic of Randburg tends to be more affluent than most of Johannesburg. The area was declared as a white area during the Apartheid era, but post-apartheid has attracted a varied population. In 2001, it was still predominantly occupied by white English and Afrikaans suburbanites.

== Geography ==
Randburg is located 18 km north-west of Johannesburg's Central Business District (CBD) on the northwestern rural-urban fringe of the Greater Johannesburg metropolis and is flanked by Johannesburg to the south, Sandton to the east, Roodepoort to the west and the rural areas of Chartwell and Farmall to the north.

== Climate ==
The area experiences a subtropical highland climate or temperate oceanic climate with distinct seasonal variations, characterized by dry winters and warm summers.

=== Climate Characteristics ===
==== Temperature ====
The coldest month has an average temperature above 0 °C (32 °F).Throughout the year, all months have average temperatures below 22 °C (71.6 °F). At least four months in the year have average temperatures above 10 °C (50 °F).

==== Precipitation ====
The region experiences a marked contrast between wet and dry seasons. The wettest month of summer typically receives at least ten times the rainfall of the driest month of winter. Alternatively, over 70% of the average annual precipitation occurs during the warmest six months of the year.

==== Minerals ====
The region is noted for the presence of various minerals, including:

- Quartz
- Amethyst
- Citrine
- Smoky Quartz

== Suburbs ==
Randburg contains numerous suburbs; many of these are residential. The following is a list of all suburbs that fell under the municipal area of Randburg:

- Aldara Park
- Bellairs Park
- Beverley Gardens
- Bloubosrand
- Blairgowrie (most of the suburb)
- Bordeaux
- Boskruin
- Bromhof
- Bryanbrink
- Cedar Lakes
- Cresta
- Daniel Brink Park
- Darrenwood
- Ferndale
- Fontainebleau
- Hoogland
- Hunters Hill A. H. SP
- Inadan AH
- Jacanlee
- Johannesburg North
- Jukskei Park
- Kelland
- Kensington B
- Kya Sand
- Kya Sands
- Malanshof
- Maroeladal
- Moret
- Needwood
- Noordhang
- Northriding
- Northgate
- Northwold
- Northworld AH
- Oerder Park
- Olivedale
- President Ridge
- Randpark
- Randpark Ridge
- Riverbend AH
- Robin Acres
- Robin Hills
- Robindale
- Ruiterhof
- Sharonlea
- Sonneglans
- Strijdompark
- Sundowner
- Sundowner Ext
- Vandia Grove
- Windsor
- Windsor East
- Windsor Glen
- Windsor West

== Economy ==
Multichoice, a South African-founded media group, is headquartered in Randburg, together with its subsidiaries DStv, SuperSport, and M-Net. Newzroom Africa, a pan-African news channel broadcast on DStv is also headquartered in Randburg.

The central business district of Randburg had fallen into decay starting in the 1990s, and plans were made to revive the CBD by the Johannesburg municipality.

Strijdom Park is a well developed commercial/light industrial area in Randburg, wedged between the N1 Western Bypass and Malibongwe Drive. Strijdom park has a substantial auto sales and repair industry and has several other small industries that service the whole of northern Johannesburg.

Randburg has faced competition from Sandton which is normally the preferred location for businesses but offers lower rentals and property prices whilst providing easy transportation to the west and central Johannesburg. There are future plans to connect Randburg onto the Gautrain routes. Cresta Shopping Centre is located in Randburg, as is Northlands Deco Park.

== Education ==
Randburg has many schools within its borders and in the nearby areas.

=== Colleges ===
- Eduvos
- Boston City Campus and Business College
- College Campus
- AAA School of Advertising
- Vega School of Brand Leadership (Bordeaux)
- Technisa - South West Gauteng College (Bordeaux)
- Global Prospectus Development Institute

=== High schools ===
- Excelsior Learning Centre
- King's School (also primary level)
- Ferndale High School
- Hoërskool Randburg (Fontainebleau)
- Hoërskool Linden
- Radley Private High School (Ferndale, also primary level)
- Trinity House School, Johannesburg (also primary level)
- Randpark High School, Randpark Ridge
- Amazing Grace Private School (also primary level)
- SPARK Randburg High

=== Primary schools ===
- Bordeaux Primary School
- Blairgowrie Primary School
- I.R. Griffith Primary School (Blairgowrie)
- Laerskool Fontainebleau
- Laerskool Louw Geldenhuys
- Laerskool Unika
- North West Christian School
- Rand Park Primary School
- Risidale Primary School
- Spark schools Blairgowrie and Ferndale
- St Stithians College (Preparatory school)

=== Pre-primary schools ===
- Unika Pre-Primêr Kleuterskool
- [https://nmaschools.co.za/

NMAschools Pre & Primary School]

== Transport ==
=== Air Transport ===
The Lanseria International Airport, located just outside Randburg is conveniently situated within the greater vicinity of the town, located about 15 kilometres (9.3 mi) north-west of the suburb of Northriding. Lanseria mainly handles general aviation traffic however FlySafair currently offers scheduled domestic services to Cape Town and Durban.

Alternatively, the O.R. Tambo International Airport situated approximately 32 kilometres (19.9 mi) east of Randburg on the East Rand has a wider variety of scheduled flights to other domestic destinations in South Africa, regional destinations in Africa and intercontinental destinations in Asia, Australia, Europe, North America and South America.

=== Road Transport ===
The N1 national route (Western Bypass) is the sole freeway providing access to Randburg and connects the town with Roodepoort and Bloemfontein to the south and Midrand and Pretoria to the north. Randburg is connected to the N1 by the M5 (Beyers Naude Drive) and R512 (Malibongwe Drive). Two regional routes intersect Randburg including the northwesterly R512 (Malibongwe Drive) connecting to the Lanseria International Airport and Hartbeespoort and the northerly R564 (Northumberland Avenue; Witkoppen Road) to Sandton and Roodepoort.

There are also a number of metropolitan routes within the Greater Johannesburg metropolitan region that serve Randburg including the M5 (Beyers Naudé Drive) to Johannesburg and Muldersdrift, M6 (John Vorster Road; Ysterhout Drive; Hans Schoeman Street; Hill Street) to Roodepoort, M20 (Republic Road) to Johannesburg and Sandton and the M71 (Bram Fischer Drive) which runs as the main street of the CBD to Sandton.

== Sport ==
- Randburg Astroturf is a field hockey stadium.

== Notable residents ==
- Pastor Ray McCauley (born 1 October 1949) is the founder of the Rhema Family Church, one of the largest charismatic churches in South Africa. He established the church in Randburg, where it has grown into a major religious institution with a large congregation and significant impact on the South African Christian community. Pastor McCauley is also known for his involvement in various social and political initiatives, advocating for moral and spiritual values in the public sphere.
- Gift Ngoepe: Mpho Gift Ngoepe is a South African baseball player who became the first African-born player to compete in Major League Baseball (MLB) in the United States. He has played for the Pittsburgh Pirates and Toronto Blue Jays.
- Michael Morton: A professional footballer, Morton played as a midfielder for several top clubs in the Premiership, including Orlando Pirates and AmaZulu.
- Mariella Venter: An accomplished swimmer, Mariella Venter has represented South Africa in various international competitions. She specializes in backstroke events and has been a strong competitor in the African Games and Commonwealth Games.
- Charles Elwes: A distinguished British rower who achieved national prominence as a schoolboy by competing in junior world championships. He won silver in the junior coxed four in 2014 and repeated the feat in the coxless four in 2015. Transitioning to the under-23 level, Elwes secured silver in 2017 and 2018 and gold in 2019. His senior career highlights include a bronze medal at the Tokyo 2020 Olympics, gold at the European Rowing Championships, and victories at the World Rowing Cups. Elwes also won gold at the 2022 World Rowing Championships and followed with another gold in 2023. He further cemented his legacy by winning gold at the 2024 Summer Olympics.
