= Cresta Shopping Centre =

- Location: Cresta, Randburg, South Africa
- Coordinates: 26.1305°S 27.9737°E
- Opened: 1977
- Owner: Pareto, a unit of the Public Investment Corporation

Cresta Shopping Centre is a shopping centre in Randburg, South Africa. It is located on the border of Northcliff and Cresta. It has gone through multiple extensions and refurbishments. The mall is owned by Pareto, a unit of the Public Investment Corporation.

The original design of the shopping centre had a model train which would run through the centre of the shopping centre stopping at various places around the inner mall to allow passengers off. The train would then come out one of the entrances and around a loop. Turning the train around inside the centre was done on a giant turntable, which became more popular to watch than the train itself. The train was removed in approximately 1992.

Cresta was built in 1977. The first refurbishment finished in 1987 for the tenth anniversary adding the section from present day Showbiz ending just past Edgars. It was during this refurbishment that the train was added with the outside fun park with castle and pirate ship with water cannons. The transformation to family shopping mall is probably the recipe for its success. In 1990 the second refurbishment was completed bridging the road and adding an ice skating rink. The ice skating rink was subsequently changed into a cinema complex. In 2002 more additions were added including a third floor near CNA, an extension and parking lot at Stuttafords where the original Checkers stood, and an extension past the cinemas including a theatre and restaurant complex.

Further remodeling and expansion was announced in 2012 and 2013.
