= Cresta, Gauteng =

Cresta
- Location within Gauteng Location within South Africa
- Coordinates: 26°07′36″S 27°58′45″E
- Country: South Africa
- Province: Gauteng
- Municipality: City of Johannesburg
- Main Place: Randburg

Area
  - Total: 1.17 km^{2} (0.45 sq mi)

Population (2011)
  - Total: 1,620
  - Density: 1,380/km^{2} (3,590/sq mi)

Racial makeup (2011)
  - Black African: 26.6%
  - Coloured: 3.2%
  - Indian/Asian: 8.7%
  - White: 60.9%
  - Other: 0.6%

First languages (2011)
  - English: 56.7%
  - Afrikaans: 26.1%
  - Zulu: 4.4%
  - Tswana: 2.2%
  - Other: 10.5%
- Time zone: UTC+2 (SAST)
- Postal code (street): 2194
- PO box: 2118

Cresta is a suburb of Randburg, South Africa, situated near the border of Johannesburg.

Although it is mostly a residential area, in the middle is Cresta Shopping Centre, for which the suburb of Cresta is most well-known.

Cresta is close to the N1 highway, which passes nearby, as well as Beyers Naude Drive, both main roads to and from the CBD and the Greater Johannesburg area.
