= R500 (South Africa) =

Regional route in South Africa

Regional route R500

Route information
- Length: 114 km (71 mi)

Major junctions
- North end: R509 west of Magaliesburg
- N14 / R41 west of Randfontein; R559 in Oberholzer; R501 in Carletonville; N12 near Fochville; R54 between Potchefstroom and Vereeniging
- South end: R53 / R59 in Parys

Location
- Country: South Africa

Highway system
- Numbered routes of South Africa
← R412	→ R501

The R500 is a Regional Route in South Africa that connects Magaliesburg with Parys via Carletonville and Fochville.

== Route ==
The R500 begins in the North West, 10 kilometres west of Magaliesburg, at a junction with the R509, going southwards. After 2 kilometres, it crosses into Gauteng province.

From the R509 junction, it goes southwards for 21 kilometres to reach a junction with the N14 national route. It proceeds southwards for a further 3 kilometres to meet the western end of the R41 route from Randfontein.

From the R41 junction, the R500 continues southwards for 16 kilometres, bypassing Khutsong and the Abe Bailey Nature Reserve, to enter the towns of Oberholzer and Carletonville. It enters as Ada Street and becomes Station Street eastwards for a few metres (where it meets the R559 route) before becoming Annan Road southwards. It heads south through Carletonville Central to reach a junction with the R501 road.

Continuing south, it heads south-south-east for 12 kilometres to reach a junction with the N12 national route and then bypasses Fochville to the east. From Fochville, the R500 heads southwards to intersect with the R54 road from Potchefstroom in the west and Vereeniging in the east.

Just after the R54 junction, the R500 crosses back into the North West province and proceeds southwards for 30 kilometres to reach a junction with the R53 road. The R53 and R500 become co-signed southwards for 2.5 kilometres, crossing the Vaal River into the Free State province, to reach their southern terminus at a junction with the R59 road in the town of Parys (west of the town centre).
