= R24 (South Africa) =

Road in South Africa

Provincial route R24

Route information
- Maintained by SANRAL, GDRT and Johannesburg Roads Agency
- Length: 139 km (86 mi)

Major junctions
- West end: R104 in Rustenburg
- N4 near Rustenburg; R30 at Olifantsnek; N14 near Krugersdorp; R28 in Krugersdorp; N1 in Roodepoort; R41 in Johannesburg; N3 / N12 in Bedfordview
- East end: R21 at OR Tambo Int'l

Location
- Country: South Africa
- Major cities: Rustenburg; Magaliesburg; Krugersdorp; Roodepoort; Johannesburg; Kempton Park

Highway system
- Numbered routes of South Africa
← R23	→ R25

The R24 is a major east-west provincial route in the Gauteng and North West provinces that links OR Tambo International Airport with Rustenburg via Johannesburg, Krugersdorp and Magaliesburg. The section of the route from OR Tambo International westwards up to a point in Roodepoort has been named Albertina Sisulu Road since 2013, named after anti-apartheid stalwart Albertina Sisulu.

Ahead of the 2010 FIFA World Cup, Johannesburg City Parks did works on the Albertina Sisulu Freeway section before handing responsibility for the freeway back to the Gauteng Department of Roads and Transport.

== Route ==
Detailed Route

=== Gauteng ===
The R24 begins at Johannesburg International Airport (OR Tambo International Airport) in the East Rand (Ekurhuleni), Gauteng. It heads west as a freeway, beginning with an interchange with the R21 (Pretoria-Boksburg highway), then heads west-south-west through the southern edge of Kempton Park (where it has a junction at Lazarus Mawela Road, formerly Barbara Road – M59) and Edenvale (where it has a junction at Lungile Mtshali Road, formerly Van Riebeeck Road/Edenvale Road – M37).

In Bedfordview (just after the Edenvale off-ramp), the R24 joins the N12 freeway from Mpumalanga westwards towards Johannesburg for almost 2 km to reach the George Bizos Interchange (previously Gillooly's Interchange) with the N3 highway, where the N12 leaves the westerly highway and joins the N3 Eastern Bypass southwards on the Johannesburg Ring Road, leaving the R24 as the westwards freeway into Johannesburg. Just after the interchange with the N3 & N12, it passes north of the Eastgate Shopping Centre and leaves the City of Ekurhuleni Metropolitan Municipality to enter the City of Johannesburg Metropolitan Municipality. Here, the R24 stops being a freeway.

It passes through some of Johannesburg's eastern suburbs in a south-westerly direction, including Bruma, Kensington and Troyeville, before entering the Johannesburg CBD and becoming two one-way streets (one going east as Albertina Sisulu Road, formerly Market Street, and the other west as Commissioner Street). The Carlton Centre, the fifth tallest building in Africa as of 2024, is located on Commissioner Street. Just before crossing under Johannesburg's M1 freeway at the suburb of Ferreirasdorp (south of Newtown), it intersects with the eastern terminus of the R41 road (Main Reef Road) and becomes one street westwards (no longer one-way streets). The R41 route is an alternative route to the R24 route as they both go west to Roodepoort.

Next, the R24 runs west to Roodepoort. It passes through the Fordsburg, Mayfair, Mayfair West, Langlaagte North, Crosby, Industria (where it continues by a left & right turn) and Bosmont suburbs before it crosses the N1 highway (Johannesburg Western Bypass) at the Maraisburg junction and enters Roodepoort. After passing through the Maraisburg and Florida suburbs, the R24 runs in a northwesterly direction through the CBD of Roodepoort. After bypassing Westgate Shopping Centre, the R24 leaves the City of Johannesburg Metropolitan Municipality and enters Krugersdorp in the Mogale City Local Municipality.

Through Krugersdorp, it first passes by Factoria before passing through the southern end of Krugersdorp CBD, where it intersects with the R28 route. After Krugersdorp West, the R24 makes up the southern border of the Krugersdorp Game Reserve. It then heads north-west, crossing the N14 national route at Tarlton and continuing towards Magaliesburg, which is a holiday and weekend destination for people of Johannesburg and Pretoria. On this section, just after the N14 junction, it passes by the Tarlton International Raceway. It forms the main road through Magaliesburg, meeting the eastern terminus of the R509 route in the town before meeting the south-western terminus of the R560 route north of the town.

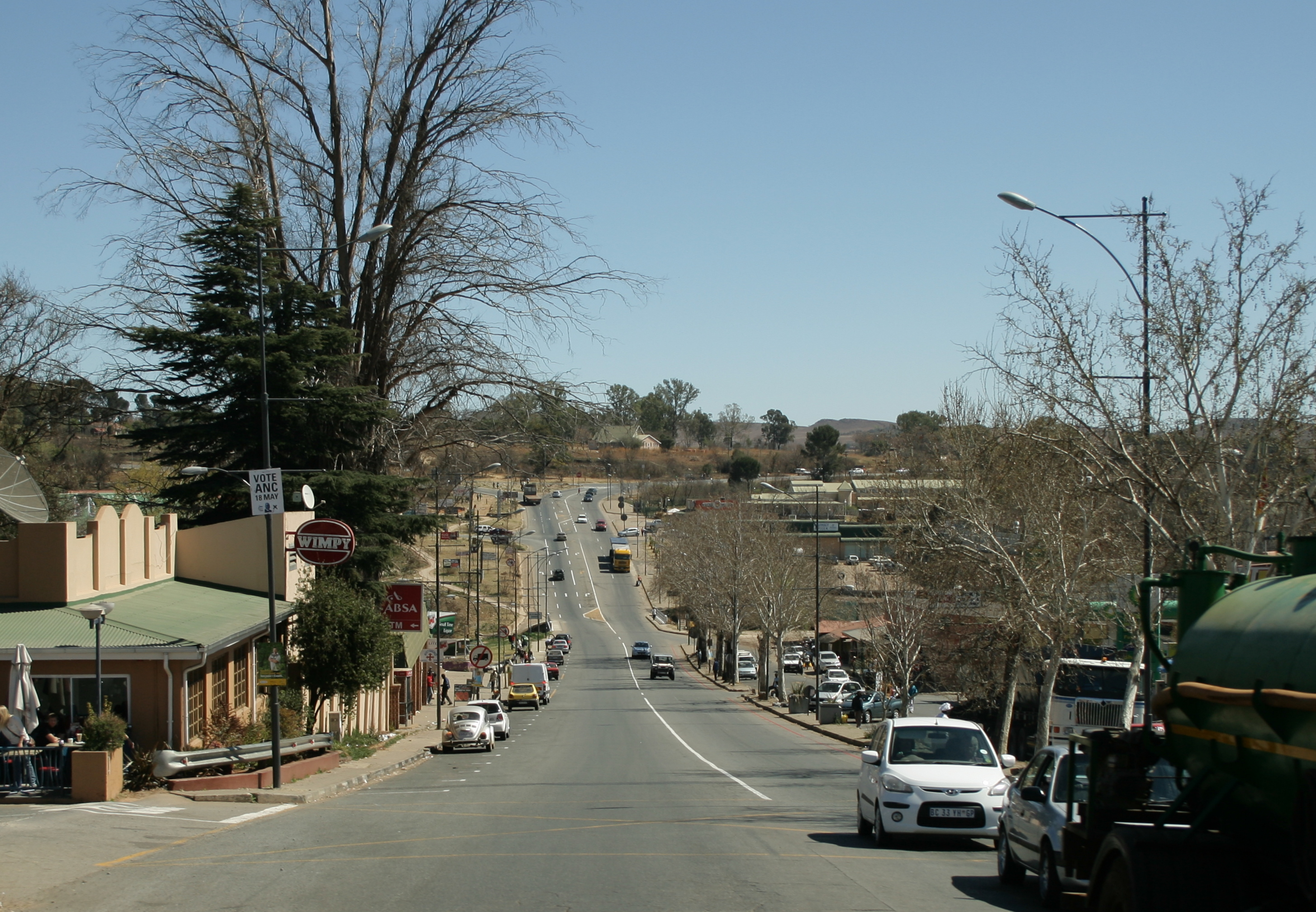
The R24 forms the main road through Magaliesburg

=== North West ===
After Magaliesburg in the Mogale City Local Municipality, the R24 leaves Gauteng and enters the North West Province in a northwesterly direction. It heads for Olifantsnek, where it meets the northern end of the R30 route and bypasses the Kgaswane Mountain Reserve and the Olifantsnek Dam. After the Kgaswane Reserve, it crosses the N4 highway (Platinum Highway) and enters the city of Rustenburg adjacent to the Waterfall Mall. It meets the R104 (Fatima Bhayat Street) just after crossing the Platinum Highway and proceeds for another 1 kilometre north-north-east to end at a t-junction just west of the Hex River. The entire section of the R24 in North-West Province was regarded as a national road in September 2012 and is now maintained by SANRAL.

== Geography ==
=== Street name ===
By October 2013, every street and freeway that makes up the R24 from OR Tambo International Airport, Ekurhuleni, through Johannesburg and Roodepoort, was officially named after Albertina Sisulu, with the only exceptions being in some one-way-street sections of the route. In Johannesburg CBD, the street for vehicles going westwards is still named Commissioner Street (name did not change) (while the parallel street going the other direction was renamed to Albertina Sisulu Road). In the Maraisburg suburb of Roodepoort, the street for vehicles going eastwards is still named 9th Street (name did not change) (while the parallel street going the other direction was renamed to Albertina Sisulu Road). The use of the street name Albertina Sisulu Road ends in the northern part of Roodepoort, at the junction with Corlett Avenue, stretching a distance of 45 kilometres from the airport.

Plans to rename Commissioner Street to Albertina Sisulu Road were included initially and the family of Sisulu welcomed this proposal but only the one-way-street for the other direction (east), Market Street, was renamed to Albertina Sisulu Road while Commissioner Street wasn't renamed.

The freeway section of the R24 was already named the Albertina Sisulu Freeway by the time of the 2010 FIFA World Cup while the non-freeway section of the R24 through Johannesburg and Roodepoort was only renamed in 2013.

As the R24 is known as the Albertina Sisulu Freeway in Ekurhuleni between Eastgate Shopping Centre and OR Tambo International Airport, the use of the name doesn't end there. The R21 freeway was named as the Albertina Sisulu Freeway in 2007, particularly the section from its OR Tambo International Airport interchange with the R24 north to the Flying Saucer Interchange with the N1 south of Pretoria (east of Centurion) in City of Tshwane Metropolitan Municipality. So, the R21 from Pretoria to OR Tambo International and the R24 from OR Tambo International to the Eastgate Shopping Centre in Bedfordview are together known as the Albertina Sisulu Freeway.

== History ==
=== e-tolls ===
As a result of the Gauteng Freeway Improvement Project, part of the N12 freeway in the Gauteng province was declared an e-toll highway (with open road tolling) from 3 December 2013 onwards, including the 2 km section in Bedfordview where it is co-signed with the R24. As a result, the westward side of the co-signed section had an e-toll gantry installed just before the George Bizos Interchange with the N3 and motorists would be billed for driving on that section on the route.

Many motorists complained of the Loerie e-toll being positioned on the R24, as they believed that the R24 was meant to be a toll-free route for its entire length in which nobody would be charged for transporting from Johannesburg International Airport (OR Tambo International Airport) in Kempton Park to Johannesburg Central. As the R24 in Gauteng is not a route maintained by SANRAL and was not indicated as a toll road, motorists and companies wondered why motorists were being charged for being on a National Road for only 2 km on the route from Johannesburg's Airport to Johannesburg's city centre. SANRAL then changed the signs on both highways connected (N12 and R24) so as for them to indicate that there is an e-toll ahead when travelling westwards to the N3 interchange (every lane on the N12 and R24 west cosigned section passed through the gantry).

The South African government announced on 28 March 2024 that e-tolls in Gauteng would officially be shut down on 11 April 2024 at midnight. As a result of the e-toll discontinuation, all the e-toll gantries, including the Loerie e-toll on the N12 and R24 co-signed section, would no-longer operate.
