= Transvaal (province) =

1910–1994 province of South Africa

Coordinates: 25°S 30°E

Province of Transvaal Provinsie van Transvaal
- Province of South Africa
- 1910–1994
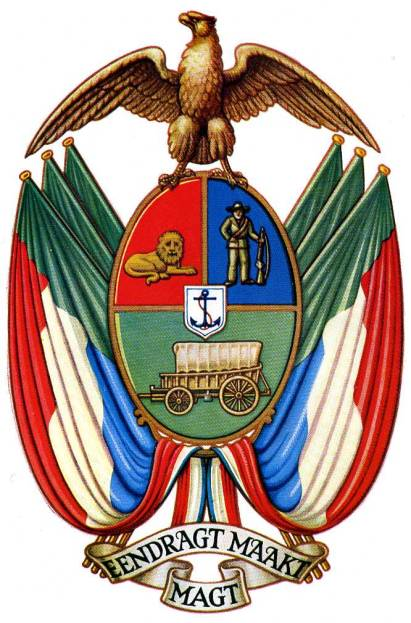

- The Transvaal as it was by 1994
- Capital: Pretoria
- Area
  - 1904: 288,000 km^{2} (111,196 sq mi)
- Population
  - 1904: 1,268,716
  - 1991: 9,491,265
- History
  - Origin: Transvaal Colony
  - Created: 1910
  - Abolished: 27 April 1994
  - Succeeded by: Gauteng, Limpopo, Mpumalanga, and eastern part of North West
- Status: Province of South Africa
- Legislature: Transvaal Provincial Council
- History
  - Established: 1910
  - Disestablished: 1994

The Province of Transvaal (Afrikaans: Provinsie van Transvaal), commonly referred to as the Transvaal (/ˈtrɑːnsvɑːl, ˈtræns-/; Afrikaans: [transˈfɑːl]), was a province of South Africa from 1910 until 1994, when a new constitution subdivided it following the end of apartheid. The name Transvaal is from the Latin prefix trans, which means across from, or on the other side. Hence, Transvaal refers to the province's geographical location to the north of the Vaal River. Its capital was Pretoria, which was also the country's executive capital.

== History ==
The area has been inhabited since at least the 8th century by the Venda and Sesotho people. From 1817 onwards the region was invaded, as part of the Mfecane, by several Nguni tribes, such as the Matabele, who have been expelled from Natal by the Zulus.

The borders of the Transvaal Province coincided with those of the South African Republic, an independent country ruled by the Dutch-speaking Boers from 1852 to 1902.

At the end of the 1830s, the Boers left with the Great Trek into the interior of South Africa, where the South African Republic was founded. Major cities such as Pretoria and Johannesburg emerged during this period. In 1902, the republic was conquered by the United Kingdom and became part of the British Empire as the Transvaal Colony.

In 1910, four British colonies united to form the Union of South Africa. The Transvaal Colony, which had been formed out of the bulk of the old South African Republic after the Second Boer War, became the Transvaal Province in the new union. Half a century later, in 1961, the union ceased to be part of the Commonwealth of Nations and became the Republic of South Africa. The PWV (Pretoria-Witwatersrand-Vereeniging) conurbation in the Transvaal, centred on Pretoria and Johannesburg, became South Africa's economic powerhouse, a position it still holds today as Gauteng Province.

In 1994, after the fall of apartheid, the former provinces were abolished, and the Transvaal ceased to exist. The south-central portion (including the PWV) became Gauteng, the northern portion became Limpopo and the southeastern portion became Mpumalanga. Most of the North West came from the southwestern portion of the old Transvaal, and a tiny segment of the Transvaal joined KwaZulu-Natal.

Even before 1994, the Transvaal Province was subdivided into regions for a number of purposes (such as municipal and district courts, and sporting divisions). These divisions included Northern Transvaal (present-day Limpopo and Pretoria), Eastern Transvaal (currently Mpumalanga), Western Transvaal (currently part of North West Province) and Southern Transvaal (now Gauteng Province, but which also includes Pretoria).

== Geography ==
The Transvaal province lay between the Vaal River in the south, and the Limpopo River in the north, roughly between 22 1/2 and 27 1/2 S, and 25 and 32 E. To its south it bordered with the Orange Free State and Natal provinces, to its west were the Cape Province and the Bechuanaland Protectorate (later Botswana), to its north Rhodesia (later Zimbabwe), and to its east Portuguese East Africa (later Mozambique) and Swaziland. Except on the south-west, these borders were mostly well defined by natural features.

Several Bantustans were entirely inside the Transvaal: Venda, KwaNdebele, Gazankulu, KaNgwane and Lebowa. Parts of Bophuthatswana were also in the Transvaal, with other parts in Cape Province and Orange Free State.

Within the Transvaal lies the Waterberg Massif, a prominent ancient geological feature of the South African landscape.

=== Regions ===
- PWV region (later Gauteng province) consisting of the Witwatersrand, which in turn consists of the West Rand and the East Rand, as well as Johannesburg; the Vaal Triangle and Pretoria.
- The North West
- Limpopo
- Mpumalanga

== Districts in 1991 ==
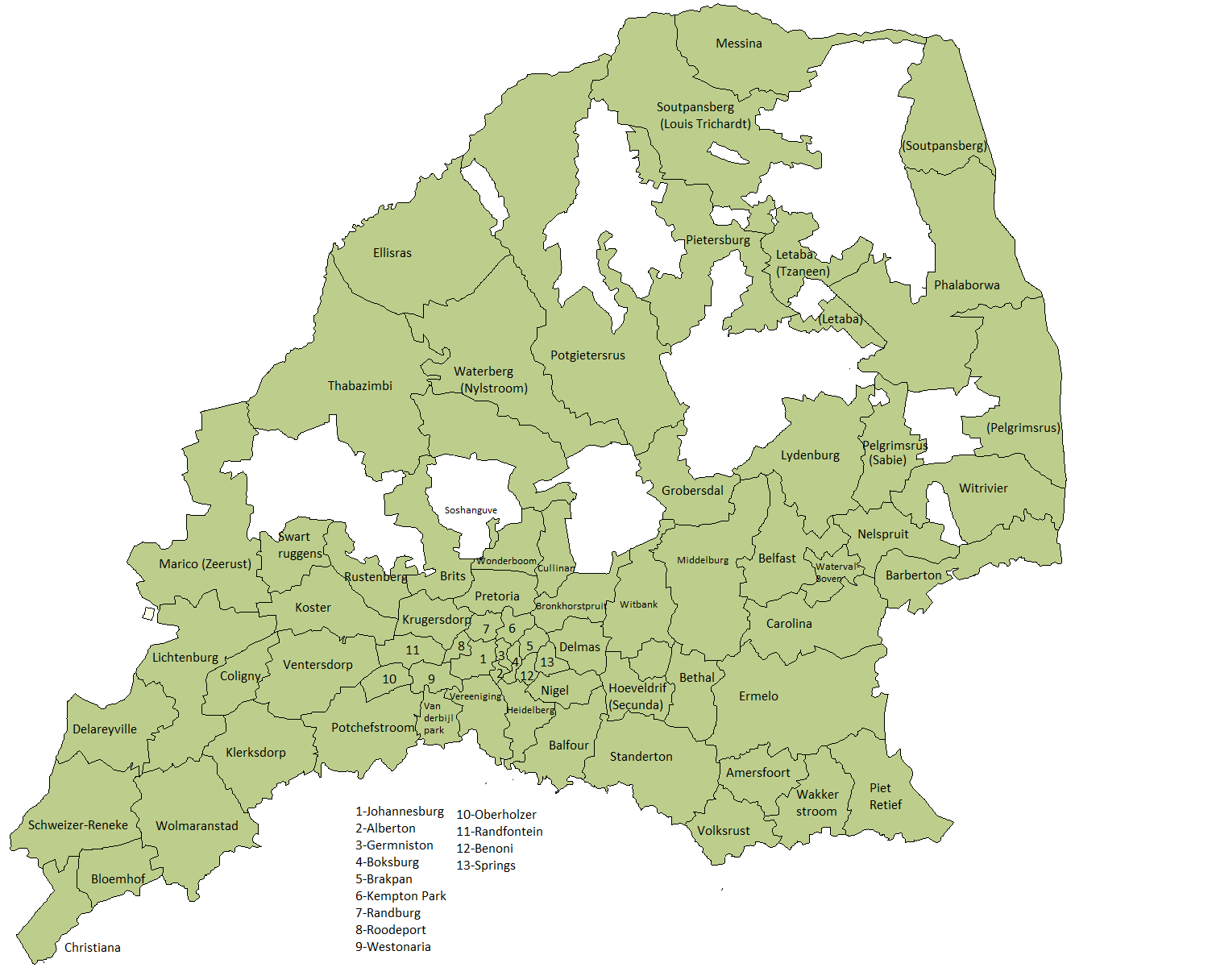
A map of districts of Transvaal

Districts of the province and population at the 1991 census.

| District | Population |
|---|---|
| Johannesburg | 1,574,631 |
| Alberton | 367,929 |
| Germiston | 171,541 |
| Boksburg | 195,905 |
| Benoni | 288,629 |
| Kempton Park | 354,787 |
| Randburg | 341,430 |
| Roodepoort | 219,149 |
| Westonaria | 160,531 |
| Oberholzer | 177,768 |
| Randfontein | 116,405 |
| Krugersdorp | 196,213 |
| Brakpan | 130,463 |
| Springs | 157,702 |
| Nigel | 92,881 |
| Delmas | 48,614 |
| Pretoria | 667,700 |
| Wonderboom | 266,153 |
| Soshanguve | 146,334 |
| Cullinan | 32,006 |
| Vanderbijlpark | 434,004 |
| Vereeniging | 250,511 |
| Heidelberg | 77,055 |
| Balfour | 38,311 |
| Standerton | 85,893 |
| Hoëveldrif (main town Secunda) | 155,881 |
| Bethal | 77,780 |
| Volksrust | 29,924 |
| Amersfoort | 33,461 |
| Wakkerstroom | 33,246 |
| Piet Retief | 64,052 |
| Ermelo | 111,082 |
| Carolina | 30,438 |
| Bronkhorstspruit | 38,605 |
| Witbank | 173,281 |
| Middelburg | 140,015 |
| Belfast | 28,973 |
| Waterval-Boven | 9,300 |
| Groblersdal | 57,742 |
| Moutse (main town Dennilton) | 102,179 |
| Nelspruit | 61,921 |
| Barberton | 72,165 |
| Witrivier | 30,235 |
| Pelgrimsrus (main town Sabie) | 29,063 |
| Lydenburg | 36,976 |
| Letaba (main town Tzaneen) | 59,900 |
| Phalaborwa | 30,126 |
| Soutpansberg (main town Louis Trichardt) | 35,839 |
| Messina | 22,959 |
| Pietersburg | 64,207 |
| Potgietersrus | 69,571 |
| Waterberg (main town Nylstroom) | 48,991 |
| Ellisras | 24,530 |
| Thabazimbi | 48,844 |
| Warmbad | 41,692 |
| Brits | 111,798 |
| Rustenburg | 125,307 |
| Swartruggens | 12,607 |
| Marico | 38,983 |
| Koster | 29,228 |
| Ventersdorp | 36,315 |
| Coligny | 22,154 |
| Lichtenburg | 79,013 |
| Delareyville | 36,036 |
| Potchefstroom | 185,552 |
| Klerksdorp | 321,478 |
| Wolmaransstad | 61,497 |
| Schweizer-Reneke | 46,893 |
| Bloemhof | 15,291 |
| Christiana | 13,596 |

== Sports ==
The province was divided into a number of sporting teams. These teams were renamed after the Transvaal became defunct, however their traditional territories have remained unchanged in many cases, even though they overlap the boundaries of the Transvaal's successor provinces.

Examples of this include the Blue Bulls (formerly Northern Transvaal), which governs rugby in Pretoria (now part of Gauteng) and Limpopo Province, and the Golden Lions (formerly Transvaal) formed in 1889.

The Orlando Pirates Football Club was founded in 1937 and was originally based in Orlando, Soweto and Kaizer Chiefs were founded in January 1970. In the same year, Mamelodi Sundowns F.C. originated from Marabastad, a cosmopolitan area north west of the Pretoria CBD in the early 1960s.

Cricket teams from the former Transvaal include Transvaal (later Gauteng) which represented the southern parts of the province, and Northern Transvaal (later Northerns) that represents the northern parts of Gauteng, including Pretoria, as well as areas further north.

== Politics ==
The province was a stronghold of the National Party.

| Province | National | United/Progressive/Democratic | Labor | Other | Total |
|---|---|---|---|---|---|
| 1943 South African general election | 11 | 47 | 6 | 0 | 64 |
| 1948 South African general election | 32 | 26 | 4 | 4 | |
| 1953 South African general election | 43 | 22 | 3 | 0 | 68 |
| 1958 South African general election | 48 | 20 | 0 | 0 | 68 |
| 1961 South African general election | 49 | 17 | 0 | 2 | 18 |
| 1966 South African general election | 62 | 10 | 0 | 1 | 73 |
| 1974 South African general election | 62 | 15 | 0 | 0 | 76 |
| 1981 South African general election | 67 | 9 | 0 | 0 | 76 |
| 1989 South African general election | 34 | 11 | 0 | 31 | 76 |
