= R509 (South Africa) =

Regional route in South Africa

Regional route R509

Route information
- Length: 102 km (63 mi)

Major junctions
- West end: N4 in Swartruggens
- R52 in Koster; R30 in Derby; R500 near Magaliesburg
- East end: R24 in Magaliesburg

Location
- Country: South Africa

Highway system
- Numbered routes of South Africa
← R508	→ R510

The R509 is a Regional Route in South Africa that connects Swartruggens with Magaliesburg via Koster and Derby.

== Route ==
The R509 begins at a t-junction with the N4 (Platinum Highway) in the town of Swartruggens, North West (east of the town centre). It begins by going south-east for 32 kilometres to the town of Koster, where it crosses the R52 at a staggered intersection. From Koster, it continues east-south-east for 17 kilometres to the town of Derby, where it intersects with the R30. From Derby, the R509 continues eastwards for 59 kilometers to meet the northern terminus of the R500. It continues eastwards for a further 10 kilometres, crossing into Gauteng province, to reach the town of Magaliesburg, where it ends at a t-junction with the R24.
