= N14 (South Africa) =

National road in South Africa

National route N14

- N14 west of Keimoes seen to the southwest

Route information
- Maintained by SANRAL, GDRT, and NWDPWRT
- Length: 1,186 km (737 mi)

Major junctions
- West end: N7 at Springbok
- N10 in Upington; N18 at Vryburg; N1 in Centurion
- East end: R101 Kgosi Mampuru Street/Sophie De Bruyn Street in Pretoria

Location
- Country: South Africa
- Provinces: Northern Cape, North West, Gauteng
- Major cities: Springbok; Upington; Kuruman; Vryburg; Krugersdorp; Pretoria

Highway system
- Numbered routes of South Africa
← N12	→ N17

The N14 is a national route in South Africa which runs from Springbok in the Northern Cape to Pretoria in Gauteng. It passes through Upington, Kuruman, Vryburg, Krugersdorp and Centurion. The section between Pretoria and Krugersdorp is maintained by the Gauteng Department of Roads and Transport and is also designated the P158.

== Route ==
Detailed Route

=== Northern Cape ===
The N14 begins as Voortrekker Street in Springbok, at an intersection with the R355, just next to its N7 off-ramp. It leaves the town towards the east, crossing under the N7 and then heads north-east past Carolusberg and through the Goegap Nature Reserve. It then enters Pofadder from the west, intersecting the R358 in the town centre. It leaves eastwards, then turns to the north-east towards Kakamas, entering the town from the west. It's intersected by the R359 in the town before leaving to the north, crossing the Orange River and then heading east to intersect with the northern terminus of the R27 in Keimoes before heading north out of the town. The N14 continues north-east, following the Orange River, to reach Upington. In the town centre, it intersects with the N10 at a staggered junction before continuing north-east to Olifantshoek and Kathu, meeting the R385, R325 and R380 routes. It then passes through Kuruman as its main road, intersecting the R31 in the town. It leaves north-east and crosses into the North West province.

=== North West ===
Crossing into the province, the route is intersected at t-junction by the R371. The N14 continues east-north-east and enters Vryburg from the south-west, becoming the town's main road through the centre (Market Street) and crossing the N18 before leaving Vryburg to the east. The road continues south-east, meeting the north-western terminus of the R34, before turning north-east to head to Delareyville. Just outside the town, the R377 intersects from the west, while the N14 enters the town from the west. It meets the R507 and heads north through the town as its main road (Generaal Delarey Street). Leaving north-east, it passes the Barberspan Dam and nature reserve before passing through Roosville as its main road. The route goes north-east through Sannieshof to Biesiesvlei, where the N14 meets the south-western terminus of the R52 before turning east to reach the R505 at a t-junction in Ga-Maloka. It co-signs with the R505 southwards for 150 metres before continuing east and north-east to Coligny. Here it cosigns with the R503 for 2 km as a ring road to the south of the town before heading eastwards to Ventersdorp. The route bypasses the town to the south, first crossing the R30 and then the R53, as it leaves heading east again. Shortly after the village of Klerkskraal, it enters Gauteng province.

=== Gauteng ===
The N14 enters the province heading north-east, crossing the R500 and the western terminus of the R41 near the village of Holfontein. It continues north-east, later crossing the R24 south of the Tarlton International Raceway and north of the Krugersdorp Game Reserve, and then skirts the latter to its north. It bypasses north of the Krugersdorp CBD, intersecting the R563 and R540. At an intersection at Cradlestone Mall in Krugersdorp, it meets the R28 that heads south-west to the town centre and the M47 Hendrik Potgieter Road that heads south-east to Roodepoort. The N14 turns north-east at this junction, becoming a dual carriageway freeway with 2 lanes in each direction, crossing the Crocodile River, passing through Muldersdrift and crossing the R114. Shortly after Muldersdrift, there is an interchange with the M5 (Beyers Naude Drive) that heads south-east to Randburg and Johannesburg. The next interchange follows shortly where the R512 (Malibongwe Drive) crosses over the N14 just south of Lanseria International Airport. Continuing north-east, it crosses the Jukskei River and interchanges the R114 again and the R511/R562 north of Diepsloot, where it becomes 3 lanes in each direction. It soon takes an easterly direction to enter the city of Centurion, interchanging the R55 at Olievenhoutbosch and thereafter reaching the Brakfontein Interchange with the N1 (Ben Schoeman Freeway) in the southern suburbs of Centurion. The N14 and N1 switch highways, with the N1 now becoming the eastwards highway (the Pretoria Bypass) and the N14 now becoming the Ben Schoeman Freeway northwards. It bypasses Centurion Central and intersects the M34 (Jean Avenue) at Die Hoewes and the M10/M24 near Lyttelton Manor. The next interchange is with the M7 at the Groenkloof Nature Reserve near Fountains Valley. Shortly thereafter it ends in the southern suburb of Salvokop in Pretoria (just south of the Pretoria CBD), where it joins the R101 (Kgosi Mampuru Street; Sophie De Bruyn Street) northbound, marking its eastern terminus.

== History ==
Between 2015 and 2017, the N14 highway was upgraded and re-tarred from Krugersdorp to Diepsloot. Between 2017 and 2019, the section from Diepsloot to the Brakfontein Interchange was upgraded, increasing that from 2 lanes to 3 lanes in each direction. The upgrades were done by the Johannesburg Roads Agency (JRA).

== Special Regulation ==
The N14 highway has a 160 km section of the highway between Pofadder and Kakamas that allows a speed limit of 250 km/h for authorised vehicles for speed testing.
