= R559 (South Africa) =

Regional route in South Africa

Regional route R559

Route information
- Length: 71 km (44 mi)

Major junctions
- East end: R558 in Protea Glen
- R28 in Randfontein; R500 in Carletonville
- West end: R501 west of Carletonville

Location
- Country: South Africa

Highway system
- Numbered routes of South Africa
← R558	→ R560

The R559 is a Regional Route in Gauteng, South Africa that connects Protea Glen with Carletonville via Randfontein.

== Route ==
The R559 begins at a junction with the R558 road in Protea Glen, Soweto, just north of the R558's intersection with the N12. It goes north-west for 17 kilometres to reach a junction with the R28 road in the southern suburbs of Randfontein (just north of Mohlakeng).

From Randfontein, it turns to the south-west and goes for 22 kilometres, through Hillside, to reach a junction with Station Street. It becomes Station Street westwards and goes for 17 kilometres to enter the towns of Oberholzer and Carletonville. It reaches a junction with the R500 road and bypasses Carletonville Mall. From the R500 junction, it goes westwards for 18 kilometres, passing south of Khutsong, to reach its western terminus at a junction with the R501 road.
