= R53 (South Africa) =

Provincial route in South Africa

Provincial route R53

Route information
- Maintained by NWDPWRT and SANRAL
- Length: 191 km (119 mi)

Major junctions
- North end: N4 in Swartruggens
- R52 between Lichtenburg and Koster; R30 in Ventersdorp; N14 near Ventersdorp; N12 in Potchefstroom
- South end: R59 in Parys

Location
- Country: South Africa
- Major cities: Swartruggens, Ventersdorp, Potchefstroom, Parys

Highway system
- Numbered routes of South Africa
← R52	→ R54

The R53 is a provincial route in South Africa that connects Swartruggens with Parys via Ventersdorp and Potchefstroom.

== Route ==
Detailed Route

The R53 begins in Swartruggens, North West province, at a junction with the N4 national route (Platinum Highway). It begins by going southwards for 45 kilometres to reach a junction with the R52 road, which goes to Koster in the east and Lichtenburg in the west. From the R52 junction, the R53 continues south-south-east for 42 kilometres to reach a t-junction with the R30 road in the town of Ventersdorp.

The R53 joins the R30 and they become one road southwards into the Ventersdorp Town Centre as Wallis Street, then southwards as Roth Street, then westwards as Van Riebeeck Street, before the R53 becomes its own road southwards. The R53 continues southwards for 2 kilometres to reach a junction with the N14 national route.

From the N14 junction south of Ventersdorp, the R53 goes south-south-east for 47 kilometres to the city of Potchefstroom. It enters as Louis le Grange Street and becomes Chief Albert Luthuli Drive eastwards. At the Walter Sisulu Lane junction, the R53 is joined by the R501 route and at the next t-junction, the R53/R501 becomes Govan Mbeki Drive southwards. At the junction after Trim Park, the R53 leaves Govan Mbeki Drive and becomes James Moroka Lane eastwards. Just after, it crosses the Mooi River and reaches a major junction with the N12 national route.

From the N12 junction in Potchefstroom, the R53 continues east-south-east for 45 kilometres to reach a t-junction with the R500 road. The R53 becomes the road southwards and proceeds to cross the Vaal River into the Free State province and the town of Parys as Van Coller Street. It reaches its southern terminus at a junction with the R59 road west of the town centre.
