= R41 (South Africa) =

Provincial route in South Africa

Provincial route R41

Route information
- Maintained by GDRT
- Length: 65.1 km (40.5 mi)

Major junctions
- West end: N14 / R500 west of Randfontein
- R28 in Randfontein; R29 in Johannesburg
- East end: R24 in Johannesburg

Location
- Country: South Africa
- Major cities: Randfontein, Roodepoort, Johannesburg

Highway system
- Numbered routes of South Africa
← R40	→ R42

The R41 is a provincial route in Gauteng, South Africa, that connects Johannesburg with Randfontein via Roodepoort.

== Route ==
Detailed Route

The R41 route begins in the Ferreirasdorp suburb of Johannesburg (adjacent to Newtown), at an intersection with the two one-way-streets of the R24 route (Albertina Sisulu Road and Commissioner Street). The route begins by going west-south-west, named Main Reef Road, passing under the M1 highway (De Villiers Graaff Motorway) and meeting the western end of the R29 route in the Fordsburg suburb. It heads south-west through Crown North to enter Crown (west of Selby), where it meets the western end of the M2 Johannesburg-Germiston Highway (Francois Oberholzer Freeway), meets the M17 road (Crownwood Road) and continues west, bypassing various Chinese marts and shopping centres in the area.

North of Riverlea (south of Langlaagte North), the R41 meets Johannesburg's M5 road (Nasrec Road), which heads south to FNB Stadium and Aeroton. Continuing west, the R41 crosses over the N1 highway (Johannesburg Western Bypass) as a flyover and enters the southern suburbs of Roodepoort. It bypasses Florida and the old Roodepoort CBD to the south, where it meets the south-western terminus of the R564 (Westlake Road) and the northern terminus of the M77 (Elias Motsoaledi Street) before going west towards Randfontein. At this point, the street name changes from Main Reef Road to Randfontein Road. The R24 road (Albertina Sisulu Road) is an alternative route between Johannesburg and Roodepoort.

After Roodepoort, the R41 continues westwards, crosses the R558 road and quickly enters the Mogale City Local Municipality, bypassing the township of Kagiso. It continues westwards to enter the town of Randfontein in the Rand West City Local Municipality.

North of Randfontein Central, the R41 meets the R28 road (coming from Krugersdorp) and then makes a left and right turn to continue westwards as Lazar Street. It heads west for 29 kilometres, through Randfontein Rural and a few farming properties, to end at an intersection with the R500 road, 3 kilometres south of the R500's intersection with the N14 national route.
