= R501 (South Africa) =

Regional route in South Africa

Regional route R501

Route information
- Length: 123 km (76 mi)

Major junctions
- Northeast end: N12 west of Westonaria
- R500 in Carletonville; R559 west of Carletonville; R53 / N12 in Potchefstroom
- Southwest end: R59 north of Viljoenskroon

Location
- Country: South Africa

Highway system
- Numbered routes of South Africa
← R500	→ R502

The R501 is a Regional Route in South Africa that connects Carletonville with Viljoenskroon via Potchefstroom.

== Route ==
It begins at a junction with the N12 national route in Gauteng province (south-west of Westonaria), just west of the N12's intersection with the R28. It goes west for 19 kilometres and the first town it comes to is Carletonville, where it intersects with the R500 just south of the Carletonville town centre.

After bypassing the town centre, it continues westwards to meet the south-western terminus of the R559. Just after, it crosses into the North West province, and gradually turns into a more southerly direction, bypassing the Boskop Dam, to reach Potchefstroom to the south-west.

In Potchefstroom, it enters as Thabo Mbeki Drive and reaches a junction with the R53 (Albert Luthuli Drive). The R501 and R53 become one road eastwards on Albert Luthuli Avenue, then southwards on Govan Mbeki Avenue, before the R53 leaves Govan Mbeki Avenue and becomes its own road eastwards in the town centre. Just after, by Mooirivier Mall, the R501 meets the N12 national route for the second time.

It leaves the city in a south-south-westerly direction, initially following the Mooi River. It proceeds to cross the Vaal River into the Free State just east of the Vaal's confluence with the Renoster River and end at an intersection with the R59 north of Viljoenskroon.
