= Randfontein mine =

Uranium mine in South Africa

- Location: Gauteng, South Africa
- Products: uranium

The Randfontein mine is a large mine located in the northern part of South Africa in Gauteng. Randfontein represents one of the largest uranium reserves in South Africa having estimated reserves of 131.2 million tonnes of ore grading 0.066% uranium.
