= R54 =

R54 may refer to:

- R54 (South Africa), a road
- R-54 Landsberg/East, a former United States Air Force base in Germany
- R54: Toxic to flora, a risk phrase
