= R52 (South Africa) =

Provincial route in South Africa

Provincial route R52

Route information
- Maintained by NWDPWRT
- Length: 162 km (101 mi)

Major junctions
- Southwest end: N14 in Biesiesvlei
- R53 between Lichtenburg and Koster
- Northeast end: N4 near Rustenburg

Location
- Country: South Africa
- Major cities: Biesiesvlei, Lichtenburg, Koster, Rustenburg

Highway system
- Numbered routes of South Africa
← R51	→ R53

The R52 is a provincial route in North West, South Africa that connects Biesiesvlei with Rustenburg via Lichtenburg and Koster.

== Route ==
Detailed Route

The R52 begins in Biesiesvlei (20 kilometres north-east of Sannieshof), at a junction with the N14 national route. It begins by going north-east for 36 kilometres, through Itekeng, to the town of Lichtenburg. It reaches a junction with the R503 route and the R505 route (Dr Nelson Mandela Drive).

All 3 routes form one road northwards through the Lichtenburg CBD as Dr Nelson Mandela Drive up to the junction with Republiek Street, where the R503 & R505 become Republiek Street westwards. The R52 remains as Dr Nelson Mandela Drive up to the junction with Gerrit Maritz Street, where the R52 becomes Gerrit Maritz Street eastwards. The R52 heads north-east for 84 kilometres, meeting the R53 route, to reach the town of Koster, where it turns northwards in the town centre, becoming Rissik Street, and meets the R509 route. After the Reagile suburb of Koster, the R52 turns to the north-east and heads for 35 kilometres to reach its end at a t-junction with the N4 national route (Platinum Highway) just west of Rustenburg.
