= Blyvooruitzicht =

- Location within Gauteng Location within South Africa
- Coordinates: 26°24′4.42″S 27°24′6.39″E
- Country: South Africa
- Province: Gauteng
- District: West Rand
- Municipality: Merafong City

Area
  - Total: 3.71 km^{2} (1.43 sq mi)

Population (2011)
  - Total: 698
  - Density: 188/km^{2} (487/sq mi)

Racial makeup (2011)
  - Black African: 84.2%
  - White: 15.8%

First languages (2011)
  - Xhosa: 26.8%
  - Afrikaans: 15.2%
  - Tswana: 12.3%
  - Sotho: 10.5%
  - Other: 35.2%
- Time zone: UTC+2 (SAST)

Blyvooruitzicht (locally /ˈbleɪfʊəreɪtsəxt/ BLAY-foor-ayt-səkht; Afrikaans pronunciation: [ˈbləifuəˌrœytsəχt]) is a gold mine and gold-mining village in Gauteng, South Africa. It is situated about 5 kilometres (3.1 mi) south of the centre of Carletonville and 80 kilometres (50 mi) westwards from Johannesburg.

== History of the village ==
The name of the village is of Dutch origin meaning "happy prospect". The farm Blyvooruitzicht was first farmed by Pieter Daniël Roux and the main road through the current village is named after him. Established in 1937, Blyvooruitzicht village was built to house the workers of the Blyvooruitzicht Gold Mine which was the first to mine the gold of the West Wits line. In the late 60's and early 70's it boasted having the highest earnings per capita in the world.

== History of the mine ==
Production started in 1942 under the ownership of Rand Mines. Later ownership passed to DRD (in 1997), then Village Main Reef and more recently Blyvoor Gold.

=== Sinkholes ===
External images
- Photos of the Sinkhole memorial from the Genealogical Society of South Africa
- Location: 26°24′17″S 27°22′10″E

During the night of 3 August 1964, a sinkhole in the former mining village township of Westdene, Blyvooruitzight, buried the entire Oosthuizen family and their domestic worker, alive. Situated some 5.5 kilometres (3.4 mi) south of Carletonville, as one of four village townships at the Blyvooruitzight Gold Mine, Westdene, was consequently abandoned. The subsequent housing shortage was quickly normalised by extending the Southdene village township situated some 400 metres (1,300 ft) south of the sinkhole, with pre-fabricated asbestos housing. Unknown at the time, asbestos was since proclaimed and banned as a health hazard, but the houses are still occupied today.

An ancient sinkhole southwest of the village called the Hutgrot Cave was the shelter of the Batswana tribes during the Mzilikazi raids.

== Places of interest ==
=== The Villagers ===
Blyvoor mine and village was the setting for a SABC TV soap opera filmed in the 1970s called "The Villagers (TV Series 1976)".

=== Isidingo ===
The highest point in the village is a hill called "Isidingo", which is where the mine manager's house was built. The current soap opera "Isidingo" derives its name from it.

== Mining Operations ==
=== Gold ===
Blyvooruitzicht Gold Mining Company Limited (Blyvoor), has underground and surface operations and is situated on the north-western edge of the Witwatersrand Basin. Established in 1937, it was the first mine on the West Wits line. Production started here in 1942.

Blyvoor has two main gold-bearing horizons: the Carbon Leader Reef (CLR), which is one of the principal ore bodies of the Carletonville goldfield; and the Middelvlei Reef, which is some 75 metres (246 ft) above the CLR horizon. At present mining is concentrated on No 5 shaft.

=== Uranium ===
A pilot uranium extraction plant was put in operation at Blyvooruitzicht in October 1949 and by 1953 uranium production was done at large scale. Tailings from the slime dams created by gold mining operations were later reprocessed for both gold and uranium extraction.
