= Derby, South Africa =

Derby
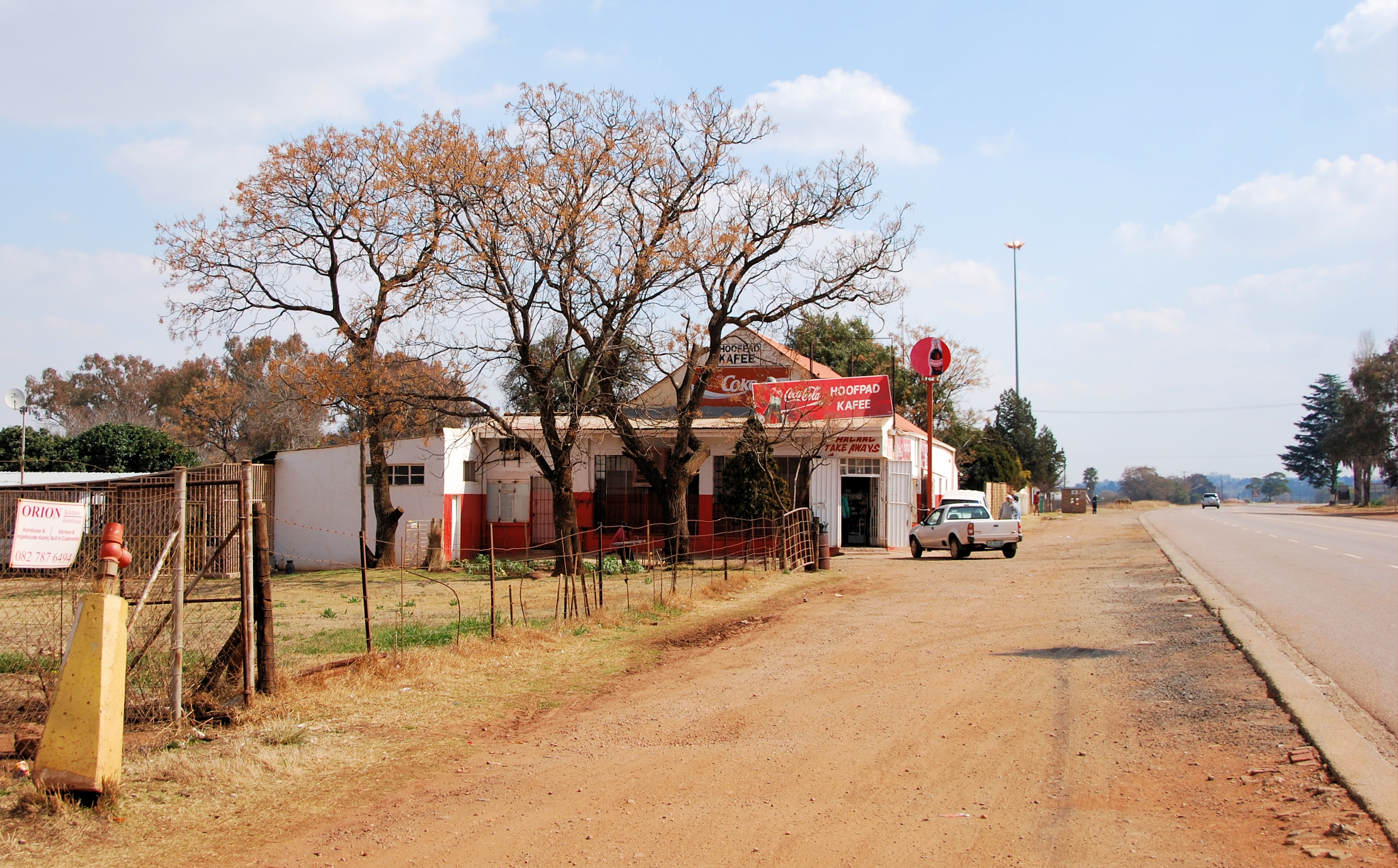

- Location within North West (South African province) Location within South Africa
- Coordinates: 25°54′S 27°02′E
- Country: South Africa
- Province: North West
- District: Bojanala Platinum
- Municipality: Kgetlengrivier

Area
  - Total: 1.78 km^{2} (0.69 sq mi)

Population (2011)
  - Total: 3,471
  - Density: 1,950/km^{2} (5,050/sq mi)

Racial makeup (2011)
  - Black African: 85.1%
  - Coloured: 0.7%
  - Indian/Asian: 1.4%
  - White: 12.8%

First languages (2011)
  - Tswana: 76.3%
  - Afrikaans: 13.7%
  - English: 4.0%
  - Zulu: 1.5%
  - Other: 4.5%
- Time zone: UTC+2 (SAST)
- PO box: 0347
- Area code: 014

Derby is a small town situated in North West Province of South Africa that was named after the British Secretary of State Lord Derby. Derby began as a refuge for destitute people.

Village 117 km west-north-west of Johannesburg, 60 km south-west of Rustenburg and 17 km east of Koster. Laid out on portions of the farms Rietfontein and Vlakfontein, it was named after Lord Derby, British Secretary of State.
