= N12 (South Africa) =

National road in South Africa

National route N12

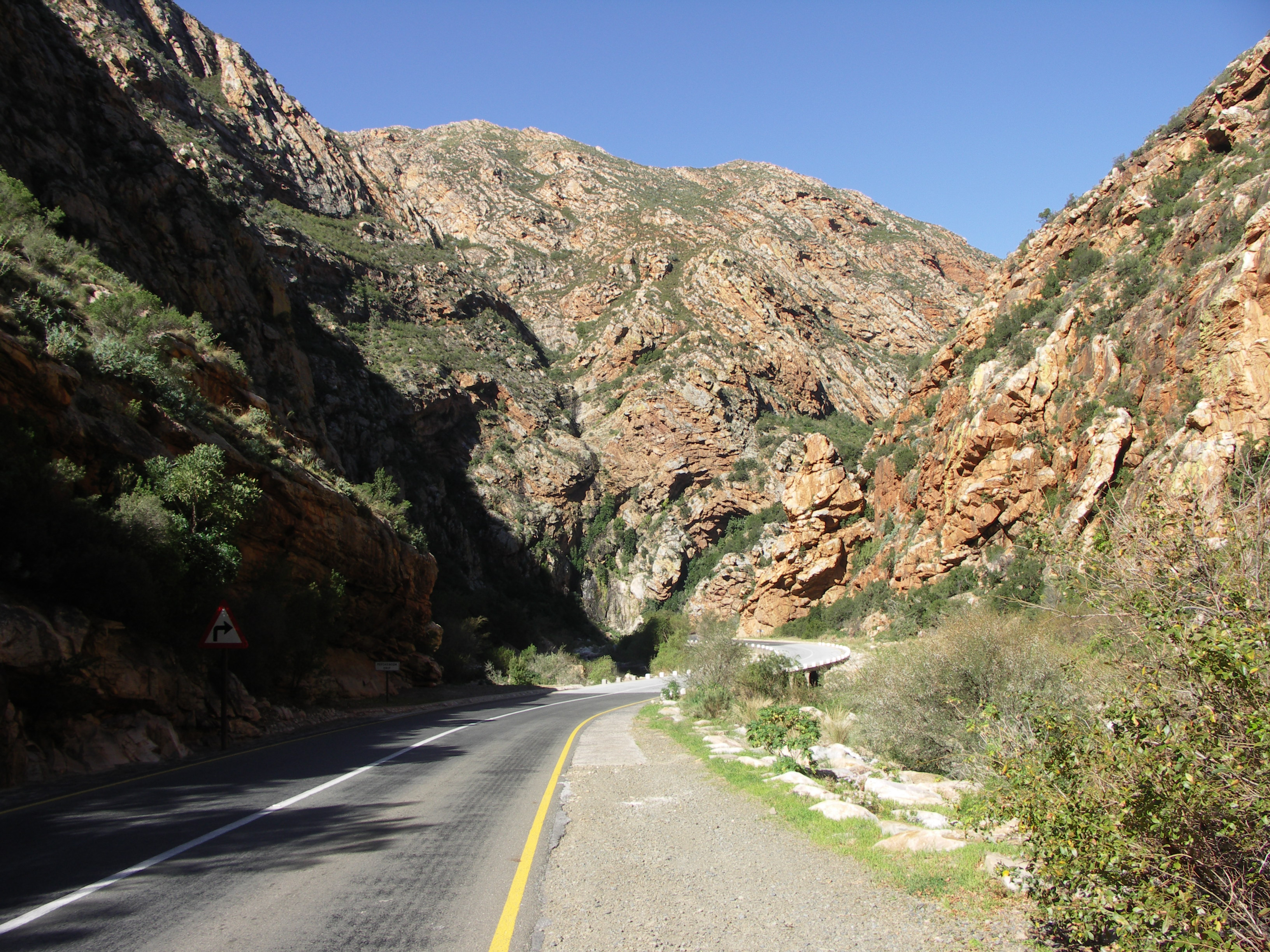
- The N12 at Perseboom Drift in Meiringspoort as it passes through the Swartberg

Route information
- Maintained by SANRAL
- Length: 1,342 km (834 mi)

Major junctions
- Southwest end: N2 near George
- N9 near George; N1 near Beaufort West; N1 at Three Sisters; N10 at Britstown; N8 in Kimberley; N18 at Warrenton; N1 near Soweto; N3 / N17 near Germiston; N3 at Bedfordview
- Northeast end: N4 in eMalahleni

Location
- Country: South Africa
- Provinces: Western Cape, Northern Cape, North West, Gauteng, Mpumalanga
- Major cities: George; Oudtshoorn; Beaufort West; Kimberley; Klerksdorp; Potchefstroom; Johannesburg; Germiston; eMalahleni

Highway system
- Numbered routes of South Africa
← N11	→ N14

The N12 is a national route in South Africa which runs from George through Beaufort West, Kimberley, Klerksdorp and Johannesburg to eMalahleni.

It is the only other national route after the N1 route that connects the Western Cape with Gauteng. Prior to 1971, the N12 from Johannesburg to Three Sisters was known as the N13.

== Route ==
Detailed Route

=== Summary ===
The road starts in George in the Western Cape and ends in eMalahleni in Mpumalanga. The road runs roughly from south to north, however, once it passes Kimberley in the Northern Cape, it gradually turns eastward. Only the section between Soweto and eMalahleni is a limited access dual motorway. The section between Klerksdorp and Potchefstroom is a dual carriage highway. The N12 remains the only National Route other than the N1 that links Beaufort West with Johannesburg.

=== Western Cape ===
The N12 route begins south-east of the town centre of George at an intersection with the N2. From this junction, it runs concurrently with the N9. It goes north-west, through the centre of George. Near Mont Fleur Mountain Estate, the N12/N9 turns northwards, passing through the western area of the Witfontein Nature Reserve as the Outeniqua Pass.

At the junction with the R62 at the northern edge of the Outeniqua Mountains, the N12 splits from the N9 and becomes co-signed with the R62, going north-west towards Oudtshoorn (33 kilometres). In Oudtshoorn, they cross the Olifants River and reach a four-way intersection with the R328, where the R62 continues by way of a left turn and the N12 continues by way of a right turn. The N12 goes east-north-east for 35 km, parallel to the Olifants River, bypassing Dysselsdorp, to reach De Rust, where it meets the R341 route. At this point, it turns northwards, becoming the Meiringspoort Pass, passing the Swartberg mountain range. After Meiringspoort, the N12 passes through Klaarstroom before heading another 7 km north-west to meet the eastern terminus of the R407. The N12 makes a 120 km journey to Beaufort West.

Just before Beaufort West, at the south-eastern edge of the Karoo National Park, the N12 meets the N1 and joins it. They are one route through Beaufort West, meeting the western terminus of the R61. The N1 and N12 routes remain as one road for the next 75 km north-east from Beaufort West to Three Sisters, where they enter the Northern Cape.

=== Northern Cape ===
At the next junction in Three Sisters, the N12 and the N1 split, with the N1 continuing to Colesberg and the N12 becoming a separate road northwards. The N12 is the only national route other than the N1 that links the Western Cape with Johannesburg, with the N12 passing through Kimberley and the N1 passing through Bloemfontein. While the N1 is a toll road from Bloemfontein onwards, the N12 is toll-free for its length.

From the Three Sisters split, the N12 makes a 170 km northwards journey, through Victoria West (where it meets the R63), to Britstown, where it passes through the town centre before meeting the N10 coming from De Aar. The two routes co-sign for 3 km northwards before the N10 makes its own way north-west towards Upington and Namibia.

The N12 continues north-north-east for 254 km, through Strydenburg and Hopetown (where it crosses the Orange River), to Kimberley (capital city of the Northern Cape). It enters as Memorial Road, meeting the south-eastern terminus of the R31 before meeting the N8 national route (which is coming from Bloemfontein) and co-signing with it northwards as Bultfontein Road. At the Long Street junction in the city centre, the N8 becomes Long Street westwards and the N12 becomes the road eastwards. Just after, the N12 meets the western terminus of the R64 (which is also coming from Bloemfontein) and becomes the road northwards (Quinn Street).

From Hopetown, the N12 gradually follows the shape of the boundary between the Northern Cape and the Free State, as well as the boundary between the North West and the Free State. (Following in close proximity; switching from going northwards to going eastwards without touching the boundary)

From Kimberley, the N12 makes a 75 km journey northwards to Warrenton, where it meets the southern terminus of the N18 before crossing the Vaal River to enter the North West Province.

=== North West ===
The N12 makes a 100 km journey north-east, following the Vaal River, through Christiana, to Bloemhof, where it meets the R34 (co-signed for 2 km) and passes through as Prince Street.

From Bloemhof, the N12 continues north-east for 150 km, passed Wolmaransstad, to Klerksdorp, where it becomes a dual carriageway and meets the R30. It continues eastwards as a dual carriageway for another 50 km to Potchefstroom (where it meets the R53 in the city centre next to the Mooi River crossing, and the western terminus of the R54 about 9 km after the city centre).

=== Gauteng ===
After Potchefstroom, the N12 enters Gauteng eastwards and bypasses the towns of Carletonville, Westonaria (where it meets the R28 road) and Lenasia as the Moroka Bypass into the City of Johannesburg Metropolitan Municipality. At the R558 junction, the N12 becomes a freeway and separates Soweto in the north from Lenasia in the south. The N12 proceeds eastwards to meet the N1 national route again (north eastbound only) at the Misgund Interchange adjacent to the Olifantsvlei Nature Reserve.

The N12 joins the N1 and they become one freeway northwards for 4 km, meeting the R553 Golden Highway, up to the Diepkloof Interchange, the south-western corner of the Johannesburg Ring Road.

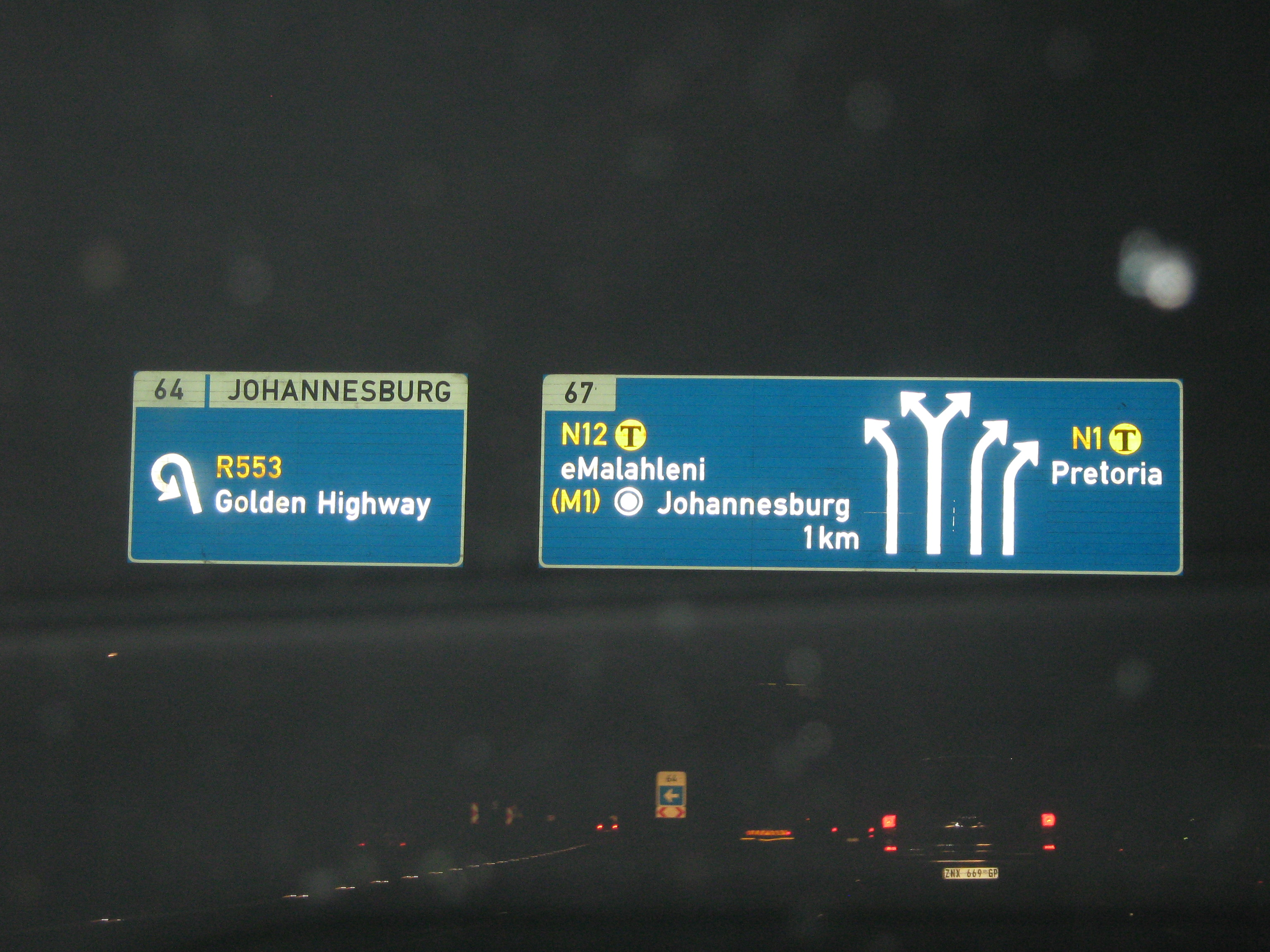
Northbound road sign at the R553 Golden Highway off-ramp before the Diepkloof Interchange

As the N1 continues north through the western area of Johannesburg's municipality as the N1 Western Bypass, the N12 becomes the highway going eastwards through the southern area of Johannesburg as the N12 Southern Bypass. Here, the N12 Southern Bypass cuts a concrete swath through the rocky hills of southern Johannesburg.

Just after splitting from the N1, north of Southgate Shopping Centre and south of the Aeroton industrial area, at the Uncle Charlie's Interchange, the N12 meets the M1 De Villiers Graaff Motorway (north eastbound only), which is the freeway to Johannesburg Central and Sandton in the north. The N12 highway continues eastwards, through many suburbs of Johannesburg South (including Ridgeway, Winchester Hills and Oakdene), to Alberton. At the Reading interchange with the R59 Sybrand van Niekerk Freeway in Alberton, the N12 begins to change direction, slowly turning northwards. The next off-ramp with the M31/R103 provides access to Alberton Central.

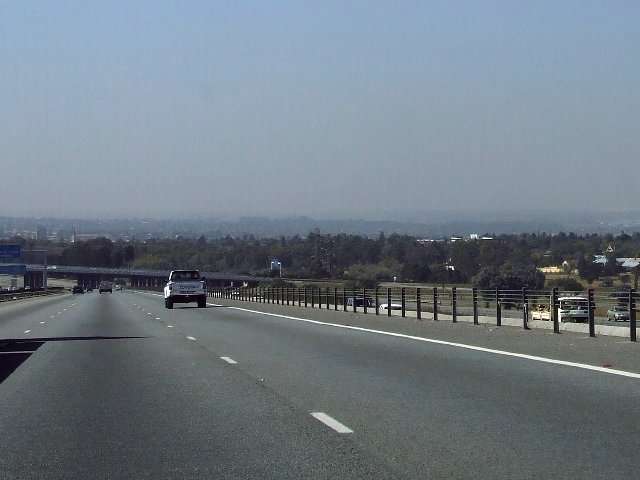
The N12 freeway eastbound near Alberton

At the Elands Interchange, the N12 flies over the N17 toll freeway and merges with the N3 freeway from Heidelberg and Durban to form the N3 Eastern Bypass portion of the Johannesburg Ring Road, going northwards. At the Elands Interchange, as part of the Gauteng Freeway Improvement Scheme, two slip roads have been made linking the N17 toll freeway to the N12 freeway. It is now possible to travel from the N17 west to the N12 west and from the N12 east to the N17 east (previously only possible via the N3).

The N3 and N12 are co-signed as one freeway northwards, passing in-between Johannesburg and Germiston (Capital of Ekurhuleni) and intersecting with the M2 freeway at the Geldenhuys Interchange, where the M2 provides access to Germiston Central in the east and Johannesburg Central in the west.

The N3/N12 continue northwards up to the George Bizos Interchange (previously known as the Gillooly's Interchange) in Bedfordview, east of the Eastgate Shopping Centre. At this interchange, the N12 leaves the Eastern Bypass portion of the Johannesburg Ring Road (which remains designated as the N3 northwards) and joins the R24 Airport Freeway eastwards. Due to common traffic at this interchange, it is purported to be the busiest interchange in the Southern Hemisphere.

The N12 is co-signed with the R24 for 2 km. Just before the Lungile Mtshali Road (M37) off-ramp, the R24 and the N12 split, with the R24 becoming its own east-north-east freeway (the Albertina Sisulu Freeway) towards O. R. Tambo International Airport (Johannesburg International Airport) and the N12 remaining as the eastwards highway towards Benoni and Witbank.

The N12 continues through the City of Ekurhuleni Metropolitan Municipality, passing through the northern parts of Germiston and Boksburg. In Boksburg, the N12 meets the R21 freeway from Pretoria and O. R. Tambo International Airport in the north (providing access to Boksburg Central in the south). It continues east as the road separating Benoni Central from Benoni's northern suburbs (where it meets the R23 just north of the town centre).

It continues eastwards, bypassing Daveyton (where it meets the R51) and Etwatwa, to leave the City of Ekurhuleni Metropolitan Municipality and enter the Mpumalanga Province.

=== Mpumalanga ===
In Mpumalanga, the N12 continues as a dual carriageway freeway and the first town it bypasses is the town of Delmas. From the R50 Delmas exit, the N12 goes for another 60 km east, meeting the R42 and bypassing Ogies, to enter eMalahleni (Witbank), where it passes through the southern suburbs.

The N12 marks its end at the point where it merges with the N4 highway (Maputo Corridor) (eastbound only) in the eastern part of Witbank.

== Junctions ==
=== Western Cape ===
Municipality	Location	km	mi	Exit	Destinations	Notes
George	George	0	0	(437)	N2, Mossel Bay, Knysna	Southern end of concurrency with N9
George	George	0	0	—	R102 York Street, George Central, George Airport, Mossel Bay	At-grade traffic circle
George	George	0	0	—	R404 Montagu Street, George Airport, Herolds Bay	At-grade intersection
George	Herold	0	0	—	N9, R62 east, Herold, Uniondale	At-grade intersection; Northern end of concurrency with N9; Southern end of concurrency with R62
Oudtshoorn	Oudtshoorn	0	0	—	R328, R62 Voortrekker Street west, Calitzdorp, Mossel Bay, R328 Baron van Reede Street north, Prince Albert	At-grade intersection; Northern end of concurrency with R62
Oudtshoorn	De Rust	0	0	—	R341, Willowmore	At-grade intersection
Prince Albert	Klaarstroom	0	0	—	R407, Prince Albert	At-grade intersection
Beaufort West	Beaufort West	0	0	—	N1 west, Laingsburg	At-grade intersection; South-western end of concurrency with N1
Beaufort West	Beaufort West	0	0	—	R61 Voortrekker Street, Beaufort West, Aberdeen	At-grade intersection
Beaufort West	Beaufort West	0	0	—	R381, Loxton	At-grade intersection
N12 continues into the Northern Cape

=== Northern Cape ===
Municipality	Location	km	mi	Exit	Destinations	Notes
Ubuntu	Three Sisters	0	0	—	N1 east, Colesberg	At-grade intersection; North-eastern end of concurrency with N1
Ubuntu	Victoria West	0	0	—	R63 Church Street, Hutchinson, Loxton	At-grade intersection
Ubuntu	Victoria West	0	0	—	R403, Vosburg	At-grade intersection
Emthanjeni	Britstown	0	0	—	R384 Lang Street, Vosburg	At-grade intersection
Emthanjeni	Britstown	0	0	—	N10 east, De Aar	At-grade intersection; Southern end of concurrency with N10
Emthanjeni	Britstown	0	0	—	N10 west, Prieska	At-grade intersection; Northern end of concurrency with N10
Thembelihle	Strydenburg	0	0	—	R387 Church Street west, Prieska	At-grade intersection; Southern end of concurrency with R387
Thembelihle	Strydenburg	0	0	—	R387 east, Orania	At-grade intersection; Northern end of concurrency with R387
Thembelihle	Hopetown	0	0	—	R388, De Aar	At-grade intersection
Thembelihle	Hopetown	0	0	—	R369 Kerk Street west, Hopetown, Prieska	At-grade intersection; Southern end of concurrency with R369
Thembelihle	Hopetown	0	0	—	R369 Wild Road east, Orania	At-grade intersection; Northern end of concurrency with R369
Thembelihle	Hopetown	0	0	—	R385, Douglas	At-grade intersection
Sol Plaatje	Ritchie	0	0	—	R705, Jacobsdal	At-grade intersection
Sol Plaatje	Kimberley	0	0	—	R31 Landbou Road, Barkly West	At-grade traffic circle
Sol Plaatje	Kimberley	0	0	—	N8 Dalham Road east, Kimberley Airport, Bloemfontein	At-grade intersection; Southern end of concurrency with N8
Sol Plaatje	Kimberley	0	0	—	N8 Long Street west, R64, Schmidtsdrift, Groblershoop	At-grade intersection; Southern end of concurrency with N8; Western end of concurrency with R64
Sol Plaatje	Kimberley	0	0	—	R64 Regiment Way east, Boshof	At-grade intersection; Eastern end of concurrency with R64
Magareng	Windsorton	0	0	—	R374, Windsorton	At-grade intersection
Magareng	Warrenton	0	0	—	N18 Stasie Road, Warrenton, Jan Kempdorp, Vryburg	At-grade intersection
N12 continues into the North West Province

=== North West ===
Municipality	Location	km	mi	Exit	Destinations	Notes
Lekwa-Teemane	Bloemhof	0	0	—	R34 West Street north, Schweizer-Reneke	At-grade intersection; Western end of concurrency with R34
Lekwa-Teemane	Bloemhof	0	0	—	R34 east, Hoopstad	At-grade intersection; Eastern end of concurrency with R34
Maquassi Hills	Makwassie	0	0	—	R502, Makwassie	At-grade intersection
Maquassi Hills	Wolmaransstad	0	0	—	R505 south, Makwassie	At-grade intersection; Southern end of concurrency with R505
Maquassi Hills	Wolmaransstad	0	0	—	R504 Kruger Street west, R505 north, Schweizer-Reneke, Ottosdal	At-grade intersection; Northern end of concurrency with R505; Southern end of concurrency with R504
Maquassi Hills	Wolmaransstad	0	0	—	R504 east, Leeudoringstad	At-grade intersection; Northern end of concurrency with R504
City of Matlosana	Klerksdorp	0	0	—	R503, Hartbeesfontein	At-grade intersection
City of Matlosana	Klerksdorp	0	0	—	R30, Klerksdorp, Orkney, Ventersdorp	
JB Marks	Stilfontein	0	0	—	R502, Orkney	
JB Marks	Potchefstroom	0	0	—	Wolmarans Street, Ikageng	Westbound exit, eastbound entrance
JB Marks	Potchefstroom	0	0	—	R501 Govan Mbeki Avenue, Carletonville, Viljoenskroon	At-grade intersection
JB Marks	Potchefstroom	0	0	—	R53 James Moroka Avenue, Parys, Ventersdorp	At-grade intersection
JB Marks	Potchefstroom	0	0	—	R54, Vereeniging	At-grade intersection
N12 continues into Gauteng

== History ==
=== Mpumalanga ===
The section of freeway from the Ogies interchange west to the Argent interchange was built from May 1974 and completed in 1978. It was a 25 km contract awarded to Pretoria Earthworks and Contractors and included eleven bridges and a number of culverts, with the freeway reinforced to take the weight of continuous coal trucks.

=== e-tolls in Gauteng ===
As a result of the Gauteng Freeway Improvement Project, a portion of the freeway section of the N12 in the Greater Johannesburg Area, from the R553 Golden Highway off-ramp in-between the Misgund and Diepkloof interchanges to the R51 road off-ramp in Daveyton, was effectively declared an e-toll highway (with open road tolling) from 3 December 2013 onwards.

The South African government announced on 28 March 2024 that e-tolls in Gauteng would officially be shut down on 11 April 2024 at midnight. As a result of the e-toll discontinuation, the N12 route is now a toll-free route.

== Trans-African Highway Network ==
The N18 road from the Botswana Border, passing through Mahikeng and Vryburg of the North West Province to Warrenton, together with the N12 to Beaufort West and the N1 road to Cape Town in the Western Cape are collectively declared part of Trans African Highway no. 4 (Cairo-Cape Town Highway), which links Cairo with Cape Town.

== Meiringspoort Pass ==
The Meiringspoort section in the Swartberg between De Rust and Klaarstroom follows the gorge cut by the Groot River. It is a scenic drive crossing twelve old drifts (replaced by bridges today). From De Rust one will cross the drifts in the following order: Spook drift, Boesman drift, Nooiensboom drift, Dubble Drif se Draai, Ou tol drift, Wa drift, Witfontein se drift, Ontploffings drift, Perskeboom drift, Wasgat drift, Eerste/Laaste drift.

== Monuments ==
- Herrie's Stone, Meiringspoort. The writer C.J. Langenhoven chiselled the name of the elephant Herrie from his book Sonde met die Bure, on this rock in July 1929.
