= Mogale Mogale =

- Kgosi of BaPo ba Mogale
- Reign: c. 1826–1869
- Coronation: c. 1826
- Predecessor: Semetsu BaTloka (regent)
- Successor: Moruatona Mogale
- Born: c. 1810; Wolhuterskop, Brits, North West
- Died: c. 1869; Wolhuterskop, Brits, North West
- Spouse: 12 wives
- Issue: Moruatona Mogale
- House: Mogale
- Father: a son of Moerane

Mogale wa Mogale (c. 1810 - c. 1869) was a Sotho-Tswana Kgosi (Tswana: Chief or leader) of the BaPo ba Mogale (also called Bapo, abaMbo, or BaKwena ba Mogale) in what is now South Africa. Mogale reigned for almost 50 years and through his prowess as both a military leader and strategic diplomat ended local conflicts with neighbouring tribes and established a foothold for the BaPo ba Mogale to thrive. Mogale City Local Municipality in the West Rand District of Gauteng was named after him. The Magaliesberg Mountains, town of Magaliesburg and the Magalies River all bear his name ("Magalie" being a corruption of "Mogale").

== Early life ==
Mogale wa Mogale was born about 1810 at Wolhuterskop south east of the village of Bapong in North West Province. During this time the BaPo ba Mogale, headed by Kgosi Moerane, who was Mogale's grandfather, had been in conflict with the neighbouring BaKwena ba Mogopa. This conflict saw the loss of many of Moerane's sons including Mogale's father. Mogale was then sent to live and be raised by various family members, including Moruri who may have been his mother's father.

Moerane died in 1822, and with Mogale being only 12 at the time, one of Moerane's sons Semetsu BaTloka reigned as regent. In 1826 Mzilikazi invaded Tswana land west of the Apies River with a large invasion force. At only 16 years of age Mogale advised Semetsu to ally with neighbouring tribes of BaKwena origin like the BaFokeng and BaKwena ba Mogopa. Together this allied BaKwena force met Mzilikazi's force at what is today called Silkaatsnek (also referred to as Kutata and Mpame). Semetsu fled the battle and was later killed at Trantsekwane.

Mogale was kidnapped to prevent him from succeeding the leadership of the BaPo as Kgosi. During his capture Mogale was forced to pierce his ears in accordance with the tradition of Qhumbuza. The Tswana had no such traditions of ear piercing and thus it would have been, at least to Mogale, quite a humiliation. Moruri launched several parties to search for Mogale and once found, lead a successful attack to rescue Mogale.

After returning to BaPo lands Mogale was crowned Kgosi but had to remain in hiding in the Magaliesberg Mountains for some time until Mzilikazi was expelled from the Transvaal by the Voortrekkers in the 1830s. In 1837 Mogale settled along the Magalies River (called nKgakhotse before being named after Mogale). Mogale subsequently became good allies with many neighbouring tribes as well as the Voortrekkers. In 1841 Mogale assisted the Voortrekkers in an attack on Gozane who was one of Mzilikazi's induna's.

== Chief Mogale in Lesotho ==
In 1854 the Boers began a siege against Ndebele Chief Mokopane and Chief Mogale had secretly supplied firearms to Mokopane (Makapan). With access to firearms, Mokopane fought back and a farmer named Piet Potgieter was shot. Later, A BaPo man named Rautiegabo Moerane informed the Boers that it was Mogale that had supplied the firearms. Mogale was thus summoned to appear before Vieldkornet Gert Kruger and Hans van Aswegen to explain his role against the Boers, and sensing that they were planning to arrest him for conspiracy and gunrunning, Mogale fled with many followers to seek refuge with Moshoeshoe I in Lesotho. Initially his sons and heir, Moruatona sided with the Boers but later joined his father in Lesotho for years as part of the Generals of King Moshweshwe (history and culture of Bapo and Basotho was cemented during the war against the Boers).

Chief Mogale and his followers fought the Boers on the side of King Moshoeshoe I in the Free State–Basotho Wars from 1858 till 1862.

== Later life ==
In 1862 Mogale returned to the Transvaal and purchased the farm Boschfontein from a Mr. Orsmond for 500 heads of cattle. the reason being ‘because the kraals of his ancestors were situated there’. However, he had been declared a criminal, wanted dead or alive by Veldkornet Gert Kruger, and so remained in hiding until 1865.

Sometime in the year 1865 Mogale had met with President Marthinus Wessel Pretorius of the South African Republic where they reached an agreement and Mogale was pardoned of all crimes for which he was charged. He settled on the farm Boschfontein with his people who then called it BaPong. Mogale died in 1869 and was succeeded by his son Moruatona as Kgosi of the BaPo ba Mogale.
