= Three Sisters (Northern Cape) =

Land formation in South Africa

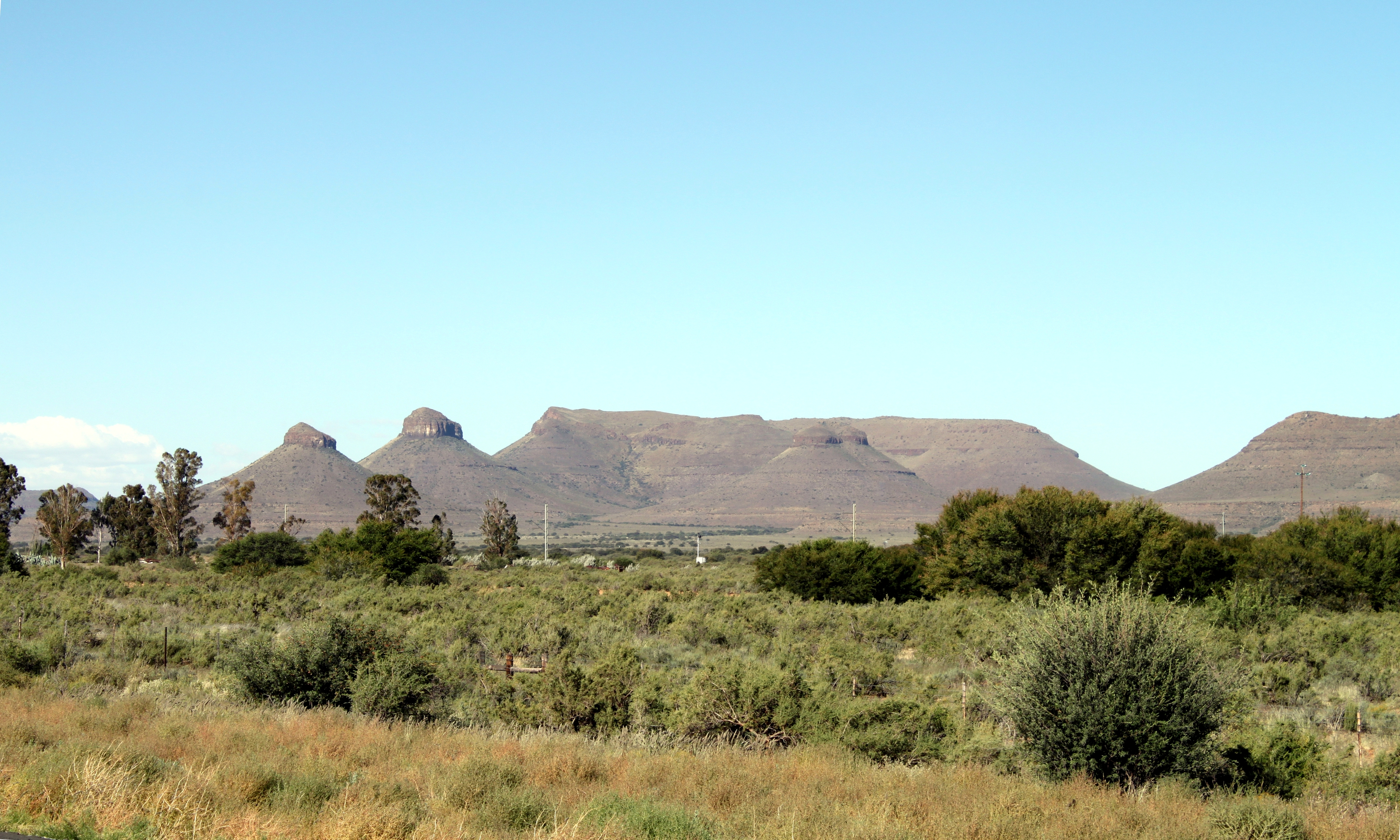
- The Three Sisters (with other mountains in the background)

Highest point
- Elevation: 1,492 m (4,895 ft)
- Coordinates: 31°53′41″S 23°8′46″E

Geography
- Location within South Africa Location within Northern Cape
- Location: Ubuntu Local Municipality, Northern Cape, South Africa
- Topo map: 3123CC

The Three Sisters are a land formation near Victoria West, Northern Cape, South Africa, consisting of three distinctively shaped hills. The farm on which they are situated and the nearby railway siding are also named Three Sisters.

The hills (or "koppies" as they are known locally) are topped with dolorite, and are nearly identical in appearance. They can be seen just to the east of the N1 highway, roughly 75 kilometres (47 mi) outside Beaufort West, north of the junction of the N1 and the N12 roads. Due to the open and mountainous Karoo scenery, the area has become a relatively well-known landmark.

There is a large Shell "Ultra City" service station nearby, on the N1 route between Johannesburg and Cape Town just south of the N1-N12 junction.

The early expansion of the Cape Colony's railway system, planned by the government of Prime Minister John Molteno and driven by Cape Government Railways, saw the Main Western Line to Kimberley pass this formation. A small railway siding was built here in 1881 and it serviced the enormous tracts of farmland in the surrounding districts.

The nearest town, Victoria West, is 61 km north on the N12. Along the N1 the nearest towns are Beaufort West situated 75 km to the southwest and Richmond 108 km to the northeast.
