= R28 (South Africa) =

Provincial route in South Africa

Provincial route R28

Route information
- Maintained by GDRT
- Length: 77 km (48 mi)

Major junctions
- North end: N14 / M47 near Krugersdorp
- R24 in Krugersdorp; R41 in Randfontein; N12 near Westonaria; N1 near Evaton; R54 near Sebokeng; R59 in Vereeniging
- South end: R82 in Vereeniging

Location
- Country: South Africa
- Major cities: Krugersdorp; Randfontein; Westonaria; Sebokeng; Vanderbijlpark; Vereeniging

Highway system
- Numbered routes of South Africa
← R27	→ R29

The R28 is a provincial route in Gauteng, South Africa that connects Krugersdorp with Vereeniging via Randfontein. The R28 used to connect with Pretoria, but that section of the road is now part of the N14.

== Route ==
Detailed Route

The R28 begins at a 4-way intersection with the N14 national route and the M47 metropolitan route north-east of Krugersdorp, Mogale City Local Municipality (at Cradlestone Mall; midway between Krugersdorp and Muldersdrift) (north-west of Roodepoort). The R28 used to proceed north-east as the route to Pretoria, but that section of the road was given to the N14 national route.

From there, the R28 heads south-west as Paardekraal Drive to pass by the Paardekraal Monument and intersect with the R24 road from Roodepoort in Krugersdorp Central. After the R24 junction, the R28 continues by way of a right turn at Main Reef Road, which is the next junction after the railway crossing. It heads south-west for 10 km as Main Reef Road before intersecting with the R41 road from Roodepoort at Randfontein in the Rand West City Local Municipality. The R28 continues southwards and meets the R559 route in Randfontein's southern suburbs before bypassing the Mohlakeng township.

Afterwards, it proceeds southwards to Westonaria (bypassing Westonaria Central to the east) and meets the N12 Moroka Bypass between Johannesburg south to the east and Potchefstroom to the west. After the N12 junction, it heads south-east as Randfontein Road for about 30 km towards Sebokeng.

Next, the R28 crosses the N1 Kroonvaal Toll Route between Johannesburg and Kroonstad and enters Evaton in the Emfuleni Local Municipality (south of Orange Farm). Right after the off-ramp, it intersects with the R553 from Johannesburg at a t-junction and joins it going southwards as the Golden Highway, passing through western Sebokeng, for 9 kilometres up to the 4-way junction with the R54 road.

At the junction with the R54 road from Potchefstroom, the R28 stops co-signing with the R553 southwards and begins co-signing with the R54 eastwards towards Vereeniging, bypassing Vanderbijlpark. After 6 km, the R54 becomes its own road eastwards (Houtkop Road, bypassing Vereeniging Central), leaving the R28 as the south-easterly road to Vereeniging Central (Boy Louw Street). After crossing the R59 Sybrand Van Niekerk Freeway, the R28 becomes Beaconsfield Road, enters Vereeniging Central and ends at an intersection with the R82 (Voortrekker Street).
