= Langlaagte North =

- Location within Gauteng Location within South Africa
- Coordinates: 26°12′00″S 27°59′51″E
- Country: South Africa
- Province: Gauteng
- Municipality: City of Johannesburg
- Main Place: Johannesburg

Area
  - Total: 0.14 km^{2} (0.054 sq mi)

Population (2011)
  - Total: 1,292
  - Density: 9,200/km^{2} (24,000/sq mi)

Racial makeup (2011)
  - Black African: 27.2%
  - Coloured: 8.1%
  - Indian/Asian: 54.0%
  - White: 8.4%
  - Other: 2.4%

First languages (2011)
  - English: 66.1%
  - Afrikaans: 7.5%
  - Tswana: 5.6%
  - Other: 20.8%
- Time zone: UTC+2 (SAST)
- Postal code (street): 2092

Langlaagte North is a suburb located west of Johannesburg's central business district (CBD), in South Africa. It borders Mayfair West and is located in Region F of the City of Johannesburg Metropolitan Municipality.
