= Tarlton International Raceway =

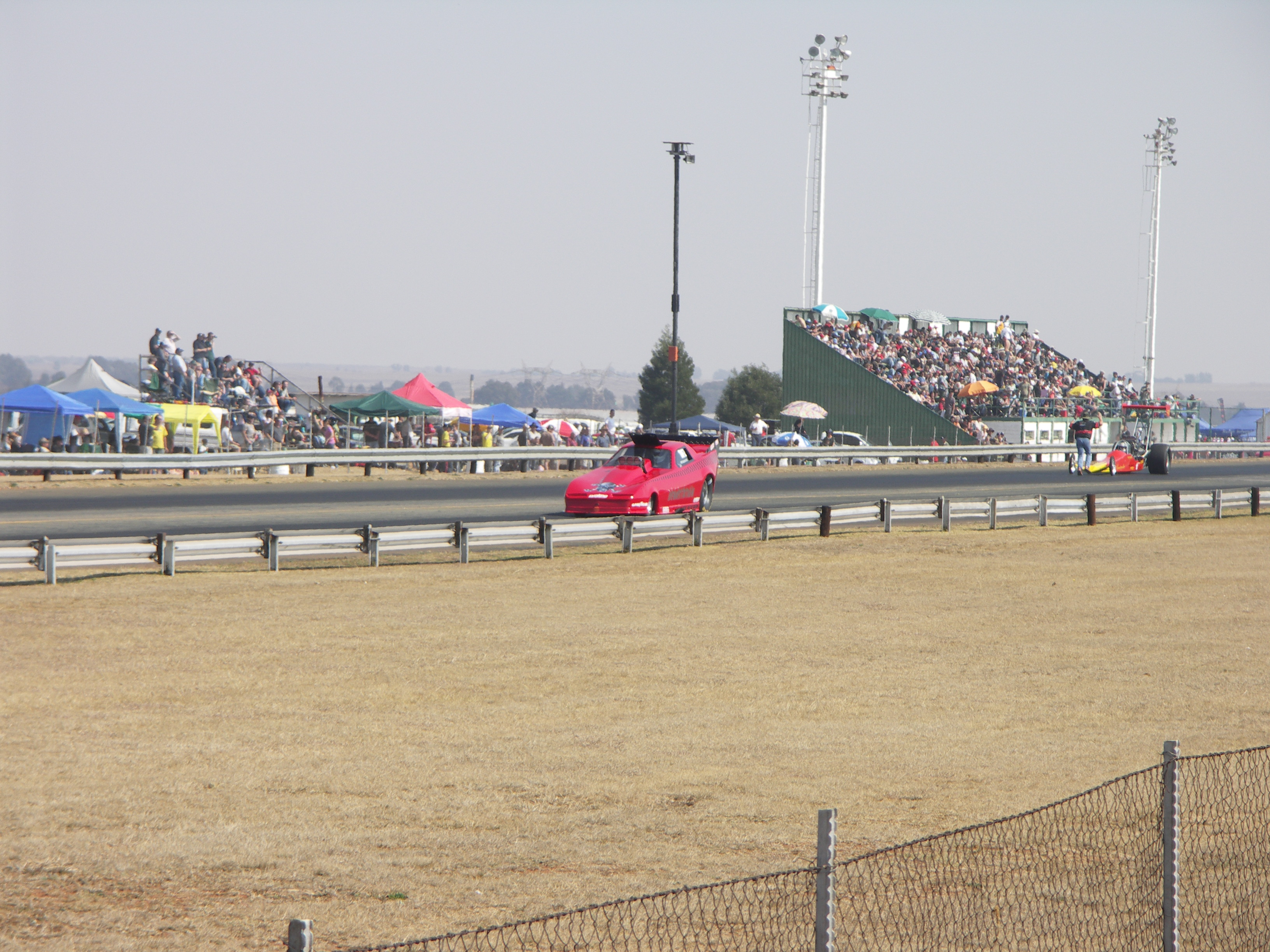
- The Tarlton Raceway
- Location: West Rand District Municipality, Gauteng, South Africa
- Coordinates: 26.056°S 27.622°E
- Opened: 1977
- Surface: Asphalt
- Length: 0.402 km (0.25 miles)

Tarlton International Raceway is South Africa's premier drag racing strip just outside Krugersdorp in South Africa on the R24 Route. And the Home of the Westinghouse Jet Cars. Officially opened in 1977, by Mick Van Rensburg. Since Opening Tarlton has hosted South African Drag Racing nationals and a variety of other Drag Racing Events.

Tarlton International Raceway sits approximately 5,500 feet (1,676 meters) above sea level.

== Films and Television ==
The 1981 film Burning Rubber was filmed at Tarlton international raceway.

== See also ==
- Drag racing
