= Mayfair West =

- Location within Gauteng Location within South Africa
- Coordinates: 26°11′53″S 27°59′55″E
- Country: South Africa
- Province: Gauteng
- Municipality: City of Johannesburg
- Main Place: Johannesburg

Area
  - Total: 0.76 km^{2} (0.29 sq mi)

Population (2011)
  - Total: 4,669
  - Density: 6,100/km^{2} (16,000/sq mi)

Racial makeup (2011)
  - Black African: 25.8%
  - Coloured: 4.8%
  - Indian/Asian: 60.2%
  - White: 6.6%
  - Other: 2.6%

First languages (2011)
  - English: 78.8%
  - Afrikaans: 10.0%
  - Sotho: 2.8%
  - Tswana: 2.6%
  - Other: 5.8%
- Time zone: UTC+2 (SAST)
- Postal code (street): 2092

Mayfair West is a suburb of Johannesburg, South Africa. The suburb is west of the Johannesburg CBD and is adjacent to Mayfair. It is located in Region F of the City of Johannesburg Metropolitan Municipality.

== History ==
Mayfair West is located on plot No. 258 of Langlaagte farm, where Sir Joseph Robinson, 1st Baronet bought mineral rights in 1886. Government surveyor M.C. Vos surveyed it and the first parcel was sold on 24 May 1896. Robinson built his mining headquarters there, including the first office building on what was previously open veld. Nearby Langerman Street is named after his general manager, who steered the company away from participating in the ill-fated Johannesburg Reform Committee. The suburb may be named after the London suburb of Mayfair.

== Sources ==
- Potgieter, Dirk J., ed. (1972). "Mayfair West". Standard Encyclopaedia of Southern Africa. Vol. 7. Cape Town: Nasou. ISBN 978-0-625-00323-5.
