= R54 (South Africa) =

Provincial route in South Africa

Provincial route R54

Route information
- Maintained by NWDPWRT, GDRT and MDPWRT
- Length: 159 km (99 mi)

Major junctions
- West end: N12 near Potchefstroom
- R28 near Sebokeng; R59 / R82 in Vereeniging; R42 in Vereeniging
- East end: N3 / R51 near Villiers

Location
- Country: South Africa
- Major cities: Potchefstroom, Vanderbijlpark, Vereeniging, Villiers

Highway system
- Numbered routes of South Africa
← R53	→ R55

The R54 is a provincial route in South Africa that connects Potchefstroom with Villiers via Vereeniging.

== Route ==
Detailed Route

The R54 begins at a junction with the N12 national route approximately 9 kilometres north-east of Potchefstroom, North West. It heads eastwards, crossing into Gauteng Province and meeting the R500 road. 62 km from Potchefstroom, the R54 passes over the N1 Kroonvaal Toll Route and enters the Vaal Triangle.

North of Vanderbijlpark (south of Sebokeng; just after the N1 overbridge), the R54 meets the R553 road and the R28 route. The R28 route stops cosigning with the R553 road southwards and begins cosigning with the R54 road eastwards towards Vereeniging. After 6 km, the R54 becomes its own road eastwards as Houtkop Road by way of a left turn while the R28 turns to the south-east towards Vereeniging Central.

Next, the R54 reaches a 4-way-junction with the R82 road (Voortrekker Street) from Johannesburg at the northern end of Vereeniging Central, right next to the R59 Sybrand van Niekerk Freeway Off-ramp. At Klip River Drive, The R54 makes a left turn and makes up the northern border of the Three Rivers suburb. North of Three Rivers East, the R54 meets the R42 road from Heidelberg and they are cosigned southwards up to the next junction, where the R42 becomes its own road westwards into Three Rivers (General Hertzog Road) while the R54 turns to the south-east.

The R54 makes a 21 km journey, crossing the Suikerbosrand River, to meet the R549 road near the north-western corner of the Vaal Dam. It continues another 50 km east-south-east, following the Vaal River, bypassing Vaal Marina, to end in Mpumalanga Province at an intersection with the N3 freeway, in the area where the Vaal River makes up its border with Villiers, Free State. It meets the southern terminus of the R51 route at the same interchange.

Just before the N3 Interchange, the R54 meets a road which provides access to the town of Villiers in the Free State via a small bridge that only allows cars going one direction to cross it at a time (using a traffic light system). This is the only alternative way to cross the nearby Vaal River (Mpumalanga-Free State Border) into the town of Villiers apart from the N3.

The total length of the route from the N12 junction outside Potchefstroom to the N3 interchange near Villiers is 159 kilometres.
