= Krugersdorp Game Reserve =

Game reserve in South Africa

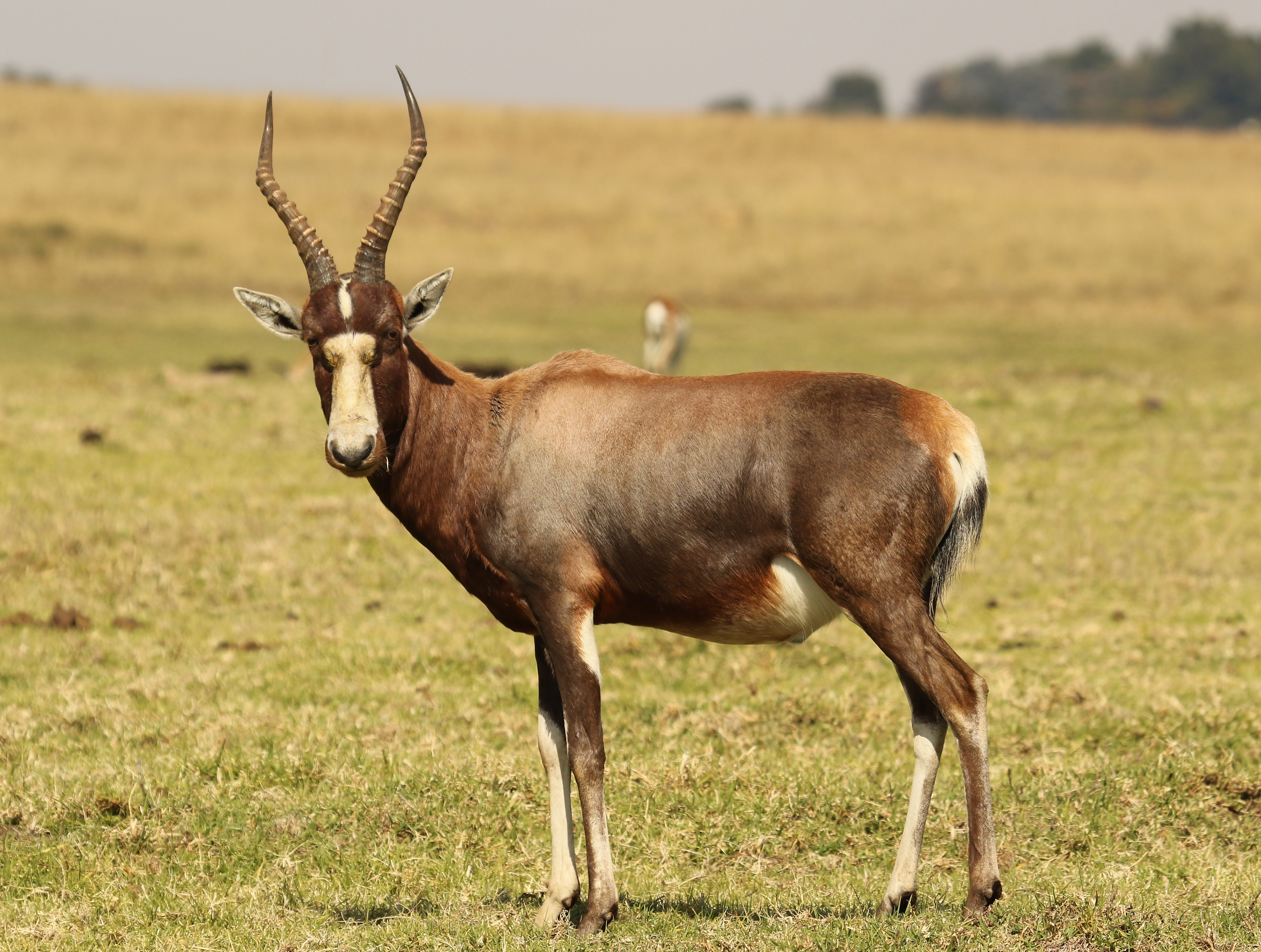
- Blesbok in the game reserve
- Interactive map of Krugersdorp Game Reserve
- Type: Nature reserve
- Nearest city: Krugersdorp
- Coordinates: 26°6.36′S 27°43.44′E
- Area: 1,500 hectares (3,700 acres)
- Open: 08h00 - 18h00
- Camp sites: Ngonyama Lion Lodge
- Species: 30 mammal types 200 bird species
- Website: krugersdorpgamereserve.co.za

Krugersdorp Game Reserve is a 1500 Ha Game Reserve, located near the town of Krugersdorp, South Africa, approximately 40 minutes drive from central Johannesburg. It is a "small, intimate reserve that offers visitors a true African safari experience.... without the hassle of travelling to a major reserve houses 15 mammal species, including one of the “Big Five”, while lions are kept in a special 100ha enclosure in the middle of the reserve. The reserve is also popular for bird watching, and more than 200 species that have been recorded there; Guests can travel the park in vehicles or on horseback.
