= Johannesburg Roads Agency =

Gauteng government department

Department overview
- Formed: 1 January 2001
- Jurisdiction: Government of Gauteng
- Website: www.jra.org.za

The Johannesburg Roads Agency is a department of the Government of Gauteng. JRA began on business on 1 January 2001 with the City of Johannesburg being the main shareholder. The JRA's plans, designs, constructs, operates, controls, rehabilitates and maintains the roads and stormwater infrastructure in Johannesburg. This extends to constructing and maintaining of bridges, culverts, traffic Lights, pathways, road signs and markings.

== Background ==
=== Facilities ===
==== Asphalt Plant ====
The JRA operates and manages an asphalt plant in Johannesburg. The plant opened due to a shortage in asphalt and the ongoing problem of potholes in Johannesburg. Due to the COVID-19 pandemic, the plant shut down temporarily and reopened in April 2021.

== See also ==
- Government of Gauteng
- Department of Transport (South Africa)
- Department of Public Works (South Africa)
- SANRAL
- Gauteng Department of Roads and Transport
