= Randfontein =

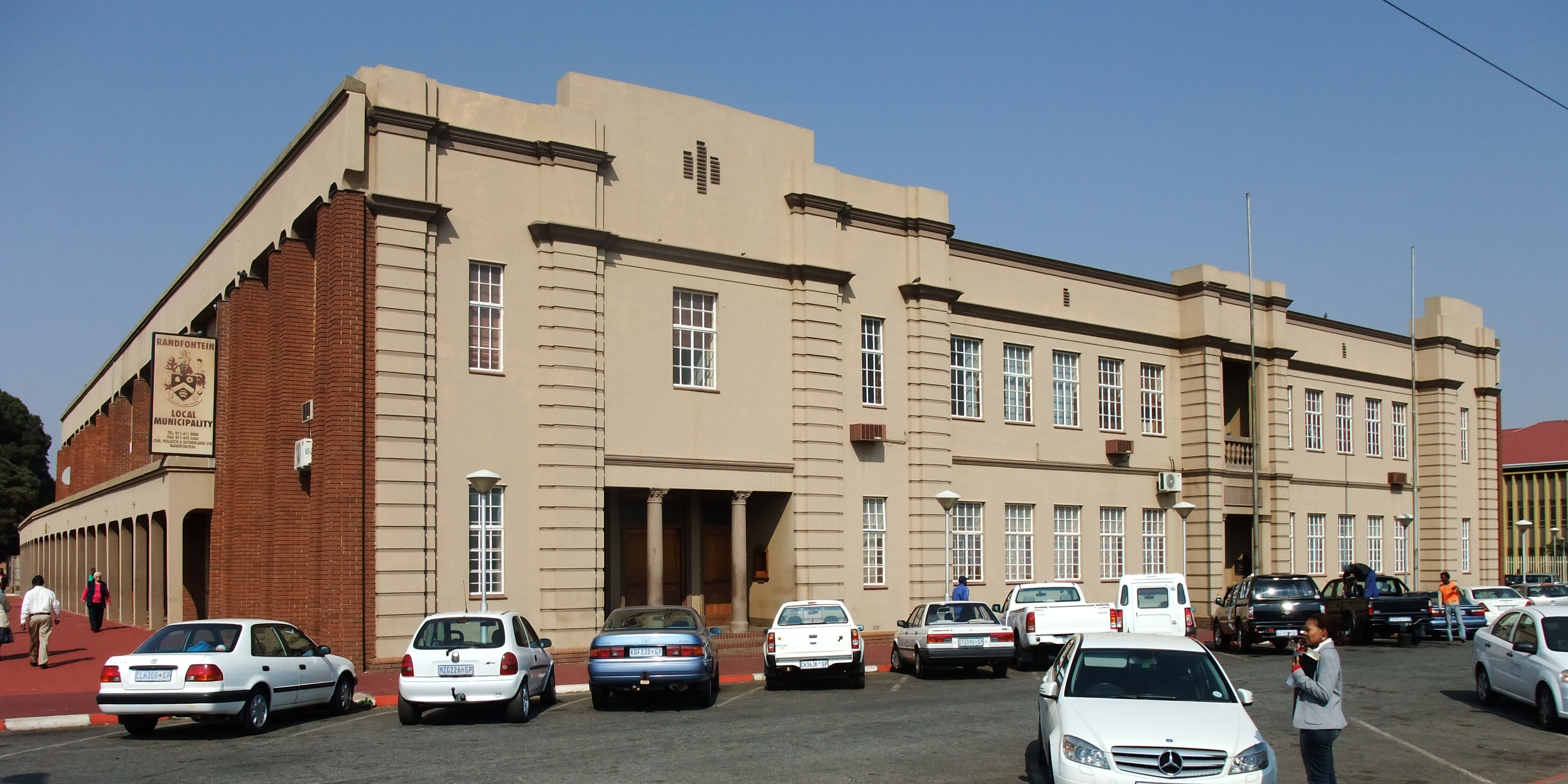
- Randfontein Town Hall

- Location within Gauteng Location within South Africa Location within Africa
- Coordinates: 26°10′47″S 27°42′15″E
- Country: South Africa
- Province: Gauteng
- District: West Rand
- Municipality: Rand West City

Area
  - Total: 186.42 km^{2} (71.98 sq mi)
- Elevation: 1,709 m (5,607 ft)

Population (2011)
  - Total: 80,492
  - Density: 431.78/km^{2} (1,118.3/sq mi)

Racial makeup (2011)
  - Black African: 44.8%
  - Coloured: 17.5%
  - Indian/Asian: 0.7%
  - White: 36.1%
  - Other: 0.8%

First languages (2011)
  - Afrikaans: 52.1%
  - Tswana: 18.4%
  - English: 7.6%
  - Sotho: 5.1%
  - Other: 16.8%
- Time zone: UTC+2 (SAST)
- Postal code (street): 1759
- PO box: 1760
- Area code: 011 and 010
- Website: http://www.randfontein.gov.za

Randfontein is a gold mining town in the West Rand, Gauteng, South Africa, 40 km (25 mi) west of Johannesburg. With the Witwatersrand gold rush in full swing, mining financier JB Robinson bought the farm Randfontein and, in 1889, floated the Randfontein Estates Gold Mining Company. The town was established in 1890 to serve the new mine and was administered by Krugersdorp until it became a municipality in 1929.

== History ==
=== Formation ===
Randfontein was established formally on 3 March 1890 and proclaimed a municipality in 1929.

Some important dates in Randfontein's history:

- 1857: Bootha and Jonker families arrive in the area. (They owned the farm Groot Elandsvlei where the suburbs of Randgate, Loumarina, and Wilbotsdal are today.)
- 1874: Gold discovered in Blaauwbank stream near Magaliesburg by Henry Lewis an Australian prospector.
- 1886: Discovery of gold on the Rand by Harrison and Walker; start of the Reef gold rush.
- 1886: JB Robinson arrives on the Reef; starts prospecting in the Randfontein area.
- 1889: Randfontein Estates Gold Mining Company (REGM) registered.
- 1890: JB Robinson buys properties and farms in the Randfontein district.
- 1894: The first shop, Fedlers, opens.
- 1901: The first car, owned by Hector Mackay, arrives in town.
- 1904: Chinese miners arrive in Randfontein.
- 1929: Randfontein Municipality established; independent from Krugersdorp which managed the town from 1903.
- 1979: Randfontein celebrates 50 years as an independent municipality.

=== Jameson Raid ===
Remnants of the Jameson Raid (29 December 1895 – 2 January 1896) can be found in Randfontein. Various graves of those killed are scattered around the West Rand. In Randfontein, the graves of troopers William Charles Beatty-Powell, John Bernard Bletsoe, Harry Davies, John Foster, and C.E. Hennessy, are hidden amongst the trees in what was originally known as the Randfontein Estates Gold Mine Military Cemetery. The graves are beside the railway line diagonally opposite where Uncle Harry's Roadhouse is currently located at the northern entrance to town from Krugersdorp.

Randfontein War Memorial: This memorial can be found next to the roadhouse on the corner of Randfontein and Main Reef Roads, the components of the memorial are all in a reasonably good condition and it is fenced off.

On 11 June 2015, a hidden graveyard with about 80 to 100 graves dating back to the 1800s was discovered near the grain silos off Main Reef Road. It's not known yet whether these are connected to the graves of the Jameson Raid.

=== Kruger Millions ===
Paul Kruger and JB Robinson enjoyed a warm friendship which has led to rumours that the Kruger Millions (millions of gold coins minted for the Zuid Afrikaanse Republiek, or the South African Republic) were buried in the Homestead's grounds to stop them from falling into British hands during the Second Boer War. The Homestead is the home that Robinson lived in which is now situated along Homestead Avenue next to Riebeeck Lake and owned by well-known local businessman and racing driver, Ben Morgenrood. Over the years, many have searched here for the Kruger Millions, but either nothing has been found, or the finder has kept very quiet about it.

== Geography ==
=== Communities ===
Central Suburbs:

- Aureus (industrial area);
- Culemborg Park;
- Eike Park;
- Finsbury
- Greenhills;
- Hectorton;
- Helikon Park;
- Homelake;
- Randgate;
- Randpoort;
- Robinpark;
- Uitvalfontein;
- West Porges;
- Westergloor.

Outlying and Surroundings:

- Azaadville;
- Bhongweni;
- Bootha Plots;
- Brandvlei;
- Dennydale;
- Dwarskloof;
- Elandsvlei;
- Hillside;
- Loumarina;
- Kocksoord;
- Middelvlei;
- Mohlakeng;
- Pelzvale;
- Randridge;
- Rietvallei;
- Rikasrus;
- Tenacres;
- Toekomsrus;
- Vleikop;
- Wheatlands;
- Wilbotsdal.

=== Monuments ===
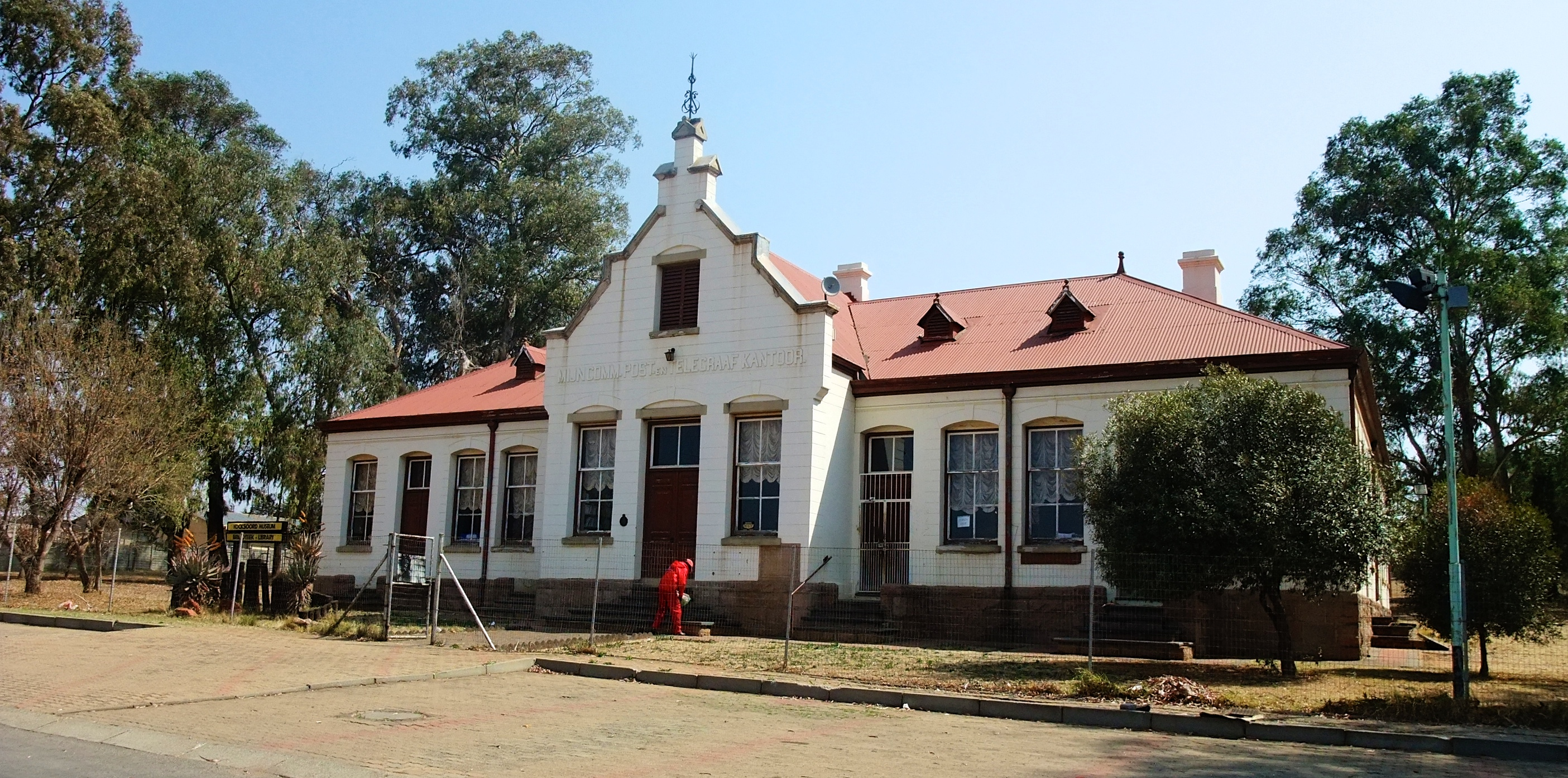
Mining Commissioner and Telegraph Office

From what can be established these are some of the oldest buildings in Randfontein:

- 1857: Homestead of Barend Bootha on the original farm called Randfontein
- 1859: Jonkerhuis (on the grounds of Riebeeck Lake)
- 1889: Mining Commissioner and Telegraph Office in Kocksoord (now a library)

=== Environment ===
Robinson Lake is situated between the Randfontein Golf Course and the suburb of Robin Park. The lake was a former recreational lake filled from water that has been pumped from the Robinson Deep gold mine. The lake has a pH of 2.6. Water has a natural uranium concentration of 0.0004 mg/L. The Department of Water and Sanitation considers a concentration of 0.07 mg/L safe to drink. Robinson Lake has a uranium concentration of 16 mg/L which is more than 220 times safe levels. This has resulted in Robinson Lake being declared a radioactive area and it is closed off to the public. The general consensus is that this has been caused by acid mine drainage. It is also however now a dangerous area and nothing is being done about the number of people accessing it.

=== Climate ===
Randfontein lies at 1,709 m above mean sea level. (By comparison, Johannesburg is at 1,733 m AMSL at the entrance to the Carlton Centre in the CBD, and Pretoria is 1,320 m AMSL in the middle of Church Square in the CBD). The climate here is mild in winter (sunny clear days and cold nights), and generally warm and wet in summer, dominated by thunderstorms. When compared with winter, the summers have much more rainfall. This location is classified as Cwb by Köppen and Geiger (dry winter, subtropical highland climate). The average annual temperature is 16.1 °C (61.0 °F). The rainfall average is 794 mm (31.3 in) per year.

== Demographics ==
As of 2011, Randfontein has a population of 149,286, which incorporates Mohlakeng and Toekomsrus. (In 2001, the population was 128,731.) The average elevation of the town is 1709m above sea level. The total municipal area, after recent restructuring, is 475 km^{2} (183 sq mi).

According to the Randfontein Socio-Economic Survey of 2006, Randfontein's population is divided into Black (79.2%), White (10.6%), Coloured (10.1%), and Asian/Indian (0.1%). The local immigrant population is made up mainly of Mozambiquans (Portuguese), Angolans (Portuguese), Malawians (Chichewa), Ethiopians (Amharic), and Chinese (Chinese). A fair portion of shops in the CBD are run by Ethiopians and Chinese.

Randfontein differs slightly from other parts of the West Rand, in that it is slightly female dominant (50.6%). This trend is throughout the gender structure with the exception of the age group younger than 14 which is slightly male dominant. The working age-group (15 to 64) is the largest and makes up 65.5% of the local population. The elderly group (above 65 of age) constitutes only 6.1% of the population.

During apartheid, Randfontein was mostly Afrikaner. The racial makeup and language distribution changed dramatically from the 2001 census to the 2011 census. The Black population grew from around 16% of the total population to around 41% of the population. Dominant languages now are Tswana, Sesotho, English, and Afrikaans, with many other languages being spoken, both local and international. English serves as the lingua franca for the town.

=== Religion ===
Most local religions are catered for in Randfontein with the following being represented:

- various Christian denominations:
  - AGS;
  - Dutch Reformed;
  - The Salvation Army
  - Roman Catholics;
  - Methodists;
  - Baptists;
  - Hervormde Kerk;
  - Jehovah's Witnesses;
  - Anglicans;
  - Gereformeerde Kerk;
  - St Paul of the Cross;
  - Afrikaans Protestante Kerk;
  - Volle Evangelie Kerk;
  - St Martin de Porres;
  - Our Lady of Africa;
  - Presbyterians;
  - NG Kerk;
  - Betesda Bedieninge;
  - Judaism;
  - Islam; and
  - Azaadville Jaamea Masjid Trust.
  - Old Apostolic Church of Africa
  - Seventh Day Adventist

== Economy ==
=== Mining ===
Randfontein owes its existence to gold. JCI was greatly involved with mining ventures around Randfontein. In the 1960s mining in the area came to a virtual standstill, but in the 1970s new gold deposits were discovered to the south of Randfontein and the Cooke Section was opened up in 1976. Cooke Section produced gold and uranium, the uranium being used for the Koeberg Nuclear Power Station in the Western Cape. Randfontein Estates had the largest stamp mill in the world, with 600 stamps.

=== Industry ===
A large industrial area, Aureus, serves greater Randfontein and many industries are scattered throughout the municipal area including the more rural areas. Notable industries, in addition to those related to mining, include the following: Nola (dog food, mayonnaise, sandwich spread, cooking oil), Tiger Brands (butter, peanut butter), and Aranda (blankets for the hotel industry and home use).

Aranda Textile Mills (Pty) Ltd is a fourth generation Italian owned family business and has been producing quality blankets and throws since 1951. Their blankets can be seen in most hotels in South Africa. A factory shop, open to the public, is located on the grounds of the factory in Homelake.

Shutterlock was established in Randfontein in 1987, the company manufactures, supplies and imports safety critical lifting and rigging equipment including mine winding rope to the mining industry in South Africa as well as SADC countries.

Other large national companies have their head offices, or main branches, in Randfontein:

- Massyn Moves, Aureus
- Hendrik van Wyk Transport, Aureus
- Grain Carriers, Aureus
- Continental Oils, Hectorton
- Harmony Gold, Randfontein Office Park, Main Reef Road
- Wearne Readymix Plant, Aureus and Brandvlei
- Forever Fuels, Aureus
- Cargo Logistics, Aureus
- Busmark (Pty) Ltd, Aureus

=== Technology ===
In a 2013 Ookla Net Index report, it was found that Randfontein has the fastest broadband access in South Africa. Randfontein has a download speed of 10 Mbit/s, followed by Bryanston, Midrand and Randburg, which are also all in the Gauteng province.

== Culture and contemporary life ==
=== Shopping ===
Shopping in Randfontein is characterized by typical High Street shopping with the majority of the shops situated along Main Reef Road and surrounds. The main mall, Village Square, is also along the main street and provides comfortable access to 72 shops (GLA approximately 20,500m^{2}). Other centres around town include: Randfontein Station Mall (20 shops) and Greenhills Spar Centre (20 shops). Numerous shops are also found along Randgate's main street, Union Street.

The proposed Lakeview Mall was abandoned due to a lack of funding. However, this development was replaced by the new Tambotie Mall (initially 20,000m^{2}) with anchor tenants Checkers, Woolworths (Foods and Fashion), and Dischem, under the management of Broll. This shopping centre is on the corner of Tambotie and Malan streets, around the southern end of Riebeeck Lake. Excavation and groundworks started in February 2016 and it opened to the public on 27 April 2017. Municipal proposals for this precinct include a housing development and a new office park to be developed later. (The first recorded armed robbery occurred at the Dischem on Friday 7 July 2017, just three months after the centre opened.)

Another shopping centre, Umphakathi Mall (12,500m^{2}), opened on 29 April 2021. This is bordered by the R28, R559, and Ralerata Street between Randfontein Central/Toekomsrus and Mohlakeng. The inclusion of a new taxi rank and a filling station will attract critical mass by creating a prominent transport node, and limiting the shopping outflow. A residential phase around the complex is being built.

=== Factory shops ===
A few factories sell directly to the public where goods can be obtained. Some of these include:

- Aranda: blankets (Tulbagh Street extension, Homelake)
- Nola/Foodcorp: rusks, Bobtail, Catmore (Desert Street, Homelake; opposite the grain silos)

=== Tourism ===
The West Rand of Gauteng is a particularly pretty part of the province flanked to the west by the Magaliesburg mountain range and to the northwest the Cradle of Humankind. Places of interest and of noteworthy historical value in the immediate vicinity include:

- Graves of the fallen British soldiers during the culmination of the Jameson Raid.
- Mining Commissioner and Telegraph Offices in Kocksoord.

The Randfontein Show is an annual event that was first held in February 1987 and is now held in February/March of each year. The largest show of its kind in western Gauteng, it plays host to live entertainment, family fun, and many things to taste, see and do. The Randfontein Show is the fifth largest event of its kind in South Africa and reaches attendances of over 110,000 annually. The show takes place at the Greenhills Sport Stadium to the west of the Randfontein Golf Course. The Show was cancelled for the first time in 2021 due to COVID-19 restrictions. In 2022 the Show was also cancelled due to COVID-19, and as of 2023 there is no longer a Randfontein Show.

The Golf Course fell into disrepair and has not been functioning since 2020. Talk of being renovated and upgraded to a Golf Estate have been heard.

There is a new show being held yearly in the place of the Randfontein show. This is at Tuinhekkie and been growing every year. There are also 4x4 days held on the plots.

Slightly further afield are:

- Krugersdorp Game Reserve, Krugersdorp West (15 km)
- Hector Pieterson Memorial Museum, Orlando West (16 km)
- Sterkfontein Caves, Hekpoort (19 km)
- Walter Sisulu Bontanical Gardens, Roodepoort (19 km)
- Maropeng Visitor Centre, Hekpoort (26 km)
- Blaauwbank Historical Gold Mine, Magaliesburg (26 km)
- Magaliesburg town centre (26 km)
- Cradle of Humankind World Heritage Site, Hekpoort (26 km)
- Hartbeespoort Dam and surrounds (75 km)
- Hartbeespoort Cableway, Hartbeespoort (80 km)

== Law and Government ==
=== Government ===
A number of government departments have their regional offices in Randfontein. This includes SARS (Stubbs Street), SASSA (Stubbs Street), Department of Labour (Main Reef Road), and Department of Home Affairs (Main Reef Road). Being smaller offices than those in the bigger centres they are relatively efficient and used by members of the public from far afield.

== Transport ==
The R28 is a regional route connecting Krugersdorp with Vereeniging that passes through Randfontein (called Main Reef Road through central Randfontein) while the R41 connects Randfontein with Roodepoort and Johannesburg. The R559 connects Randfontein with Carletonville and Lenasia.

Randfontein is served by two international airports, namely the OR Tambo International Airport in Kempton Park 80 km (50 mi) to the east and Lanseria International Airport 41 km (25 mi) north-east.

The main national Johannesburg/Cape Town railway line cuts through Randfontein although the daily train does not stop at the Randfontein station. This line also doubles as the metro rail line which serves the Witwatersrand between Randfontein in the west and Springs in the east, a road distance of about 87 km (54 mi).

== Health Systems ==
Two primary hospitals serve the Randfontein area, Robinson Hospital and Sir Albert Medical Centre. Robinson Hospital (Hospital Street) is a private hospital and part of the Lifecare Health group. The hospital boasts 109 beds and 4 theatres with a 24-hour accident and emergency unit. Sir Albert Medical Centre (Ward Street Extension) is also a private hospital and was initially focused on mine-related illnesses and diseases but has subsequently become a general private hospital. In July 2013, it was renovated and renamed the Lenmed Health Randfontein Private Hospital. Most road signs call it just Randfontein Private Hospital.

== Notable people ==
- Thapelo Morena: Mamelodi Sundowns footballer playing in the PSL
- David Goldblatt: photographer born in Randfontein 29 November 1930; died 25 June 2018.
- Jaco van der Walt: professional rugby player for Scottish side Edinburgh Rugby
- Patrick Ntsoelengoe: OIS (26 February 1952[1] – 8 May 2006) was a South African football (soccer) player who is widely considered as one of the greatest the country has ever produced. He is also a member of the National Soccer Hall of Fame in the United States.
- Ace Khuse: retired professional soccer player, he played for Kaizer Chiefs and also played abroad in Turkey for Gençlerbirliği.
- Neil Sandilands: actor, director, screenwriter, producer, film editor, and cinematographer.
