= Swartruggens =

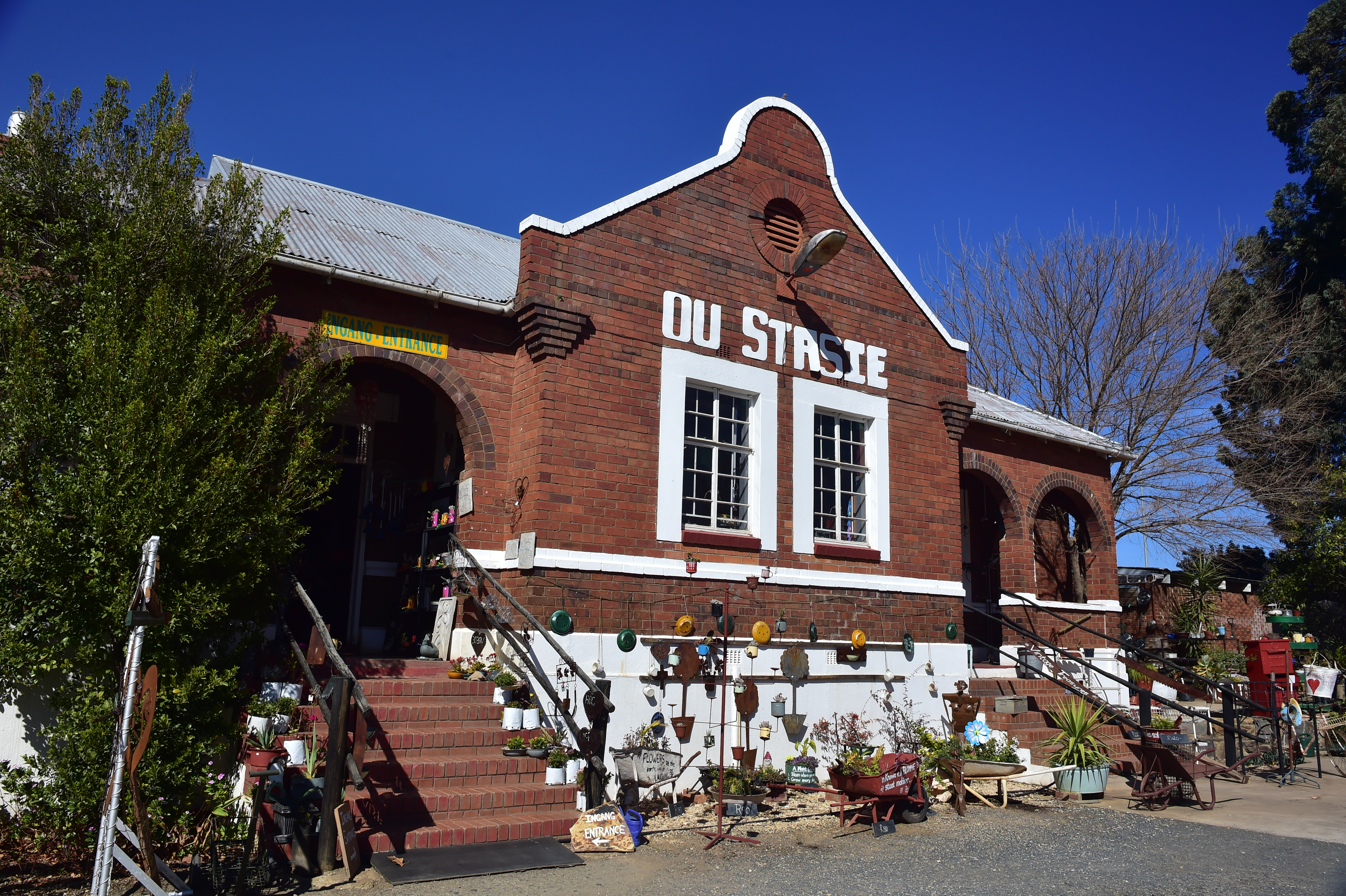
- Ou Stasie in Swartruggens

- Location within North West (South African province) Location within South Africa
- Coordinates: 25°39′S 26°42′E
- Country: South Africa
- Province: North West
- District: Bojanala Platinum
- Municipality: Kgetlengrivier
- Established: 1875

Area
  - Total: 10.74 km^{2} (4.15 sq mi)

Population (2011)
  - Total: 1,969
  - Density: 183.3/km^{2} (474.8/sq mi)

Racial makeup (2011)
  - White: 52.3%
  - Black African: 39.5%
  - Indian/Asian: 5.5%
  - Coloured: 1.8%
  - Other: 0.8%

First languages (2011)
  - Afrikaans: 57.4%
  - Tswana: 21.9%
  - English: 14.1%
  - Zulu: 1.7%
  - Other: 4.9%
- Time zone: UTC+2 (SAST)
- Postal code (street): 2835
- PO box: 2835
- Area code: 014

Swartruggens is a small farming town in North West Province, South Africa that was established in 1875.

== Location ==
The town is located on the Elands River, 69 km east of the town of Zeerust, 56 km west of the city of Rustenburg and 34 km north-west of Koster. It is on the N4 road.

It takes its name 'Swartruggens' from a series of hills, formerly known as Zwartruggens, Dutch for 'black ridges'.

== History ==
The town of Swartruggens was founded in 1875 on the farm Brakfontein.

After the Siege of Mafeking, during the Second Boer War, one of the supply depots was established by Robert Baden-Powell in Swartruggens, as he moved to Pretoria.

A cemetery for British war dead from the Second Anglo-Boer War is located in the town.
