= Mayfair, Johannesburg =

Mayfair
- Location within Gauteng Location within South Africa
- Coordinates: 26°12′15″S 28°0′41″E
- Country: South Africa
- Province: Gauteng
- Municipality: City of Johannesburg
- Main Place: Johannesburg
- Established: 1896

Area
  - Total: 1.64 km^{2} (0.63 sq mi)

Population (2011)
  - Total: 12,027
  - Density: 7,330/km^{2} (19,000/sq mi)

Racial makeup (2011)
  - Black African: 31.9%
  - Coloured: 4.1%
  - Indian/Asian: 51.9%
  - White: 1.5%
  - Other: 10.6%

First languages (2011)
  - English: 56.3%
  - Afrikaans: 4.2%
  - Tswana: 3.4%
  - Zulu: 3.1%
  - Other: 33.0%
- Time zone: UTC+2 (SAST)
- Postal code (street): 2092
- PO box: 2108

Mayfair is a suburb of Johannesburg, South Africa. The suburb is west of the Johannesburg CBD and is adjacent to Fordsburg. It is located in Region F of the City of Johannesburg Metropolitan Municipality.

== History ==
Prior to the discovery of gold on the Witwatersrand in 1886, the suburb lay on land on one of the original farms that make up Johannesburg, called Langlaagte. The land was purchased by J.B. Robinson. It was established as a suburb in 1896 and is named after Mayfair in London.

== Demographics ==
Although designated a white area under apartheid, Indians began moving into Mayfair some time before the end of apartheid.

Today Mayfair has a large Indian population, along with a significant number of Muslim immigrants from the rest of Africa. In recent years Mayfair has become populated with a large number of Somalis and Ethiopians.

== Notable residents ==
Former President of South Africa, F. W. de Klerk, the last to hold the office before the end of apartheid in 1994, was born here.
