= Aeroton =

- Location within Gauteng Location within South Africa
- Coordinates: 26°15′12″S 27°58′29″E
- Country: South Africa
- Province: Gauteng
- Municipality: City of Johannesburg
- Main Place: Johannesburg

Area
  - Total: 3.17 km^{2} (1.22 sq mi)

Population (2011)
  - Total: 11
  - Density: 3.5/km^{2} (9.0/sq mi)

Racial makeup (2011)
  - Black African: 100.0%

First languages (2011)
  - Zulu: 27.3%
  - Northern Sotho: 9.1%
  - Venda: 9.1%
  - Tsonga: 9.1%
  - Other: 45.5%
- Time zone: UTC+2 (SAST)
- Postal code (street): 2190
- PO box: 2013

Aeroton is an industrial area of Johannesburg, South Africa. It is located in Region F of the City of Johannesburg Metropolitan Municipality.
