= Oberholzer =

Oberholzer Pretoriusrus
- Location within Gauteng Location within South Africa
- Coordinates: 26.347°S 27.382°E
- Country: South Africa
- Province: Gauteng
- District: West Rand
- Municipality: Merafong City

Area
  - Total: 4.12 km^{2} (1.59 sq mi)

Population (2011)
  - Total: 5,397
  - Density: 1,310/km^{2} (3,390/sq mi)

Racial makeup (2011)
  - Black African: 35.8%
  - Coloured: 1.2%
  - Indian/Asian: 0.9%
  - White: 61.7%
  - Other: 0.4%

First languages (2011)
  - Afrikaans: 55.4%
  - Tswana: 12.3%
  - English: 10.8%
  - Sotho: 8.6%
  - Other: 12.9%
- Time zone: UTC+2 (SAST)
- Postal code (street): 2499
- PO box: 2502

Oberholzer is a town in West Rand District Municipality in the Gauteng province of South Africa. The town is 85 km south-west of Johannesburg, just north-west of Carletonville.

== History ==
Laid out on the farm Wonderfontein, it was proclaimed in March 1939 and named after the owner of the farm, Hendrik Oberholzer.

The town of Oberholzer is situated in the constituency of Carletonville & there are no distinct boundaries separating Oberholzer from Carletonville. Together, they make one city.
