= Magaliesburg =

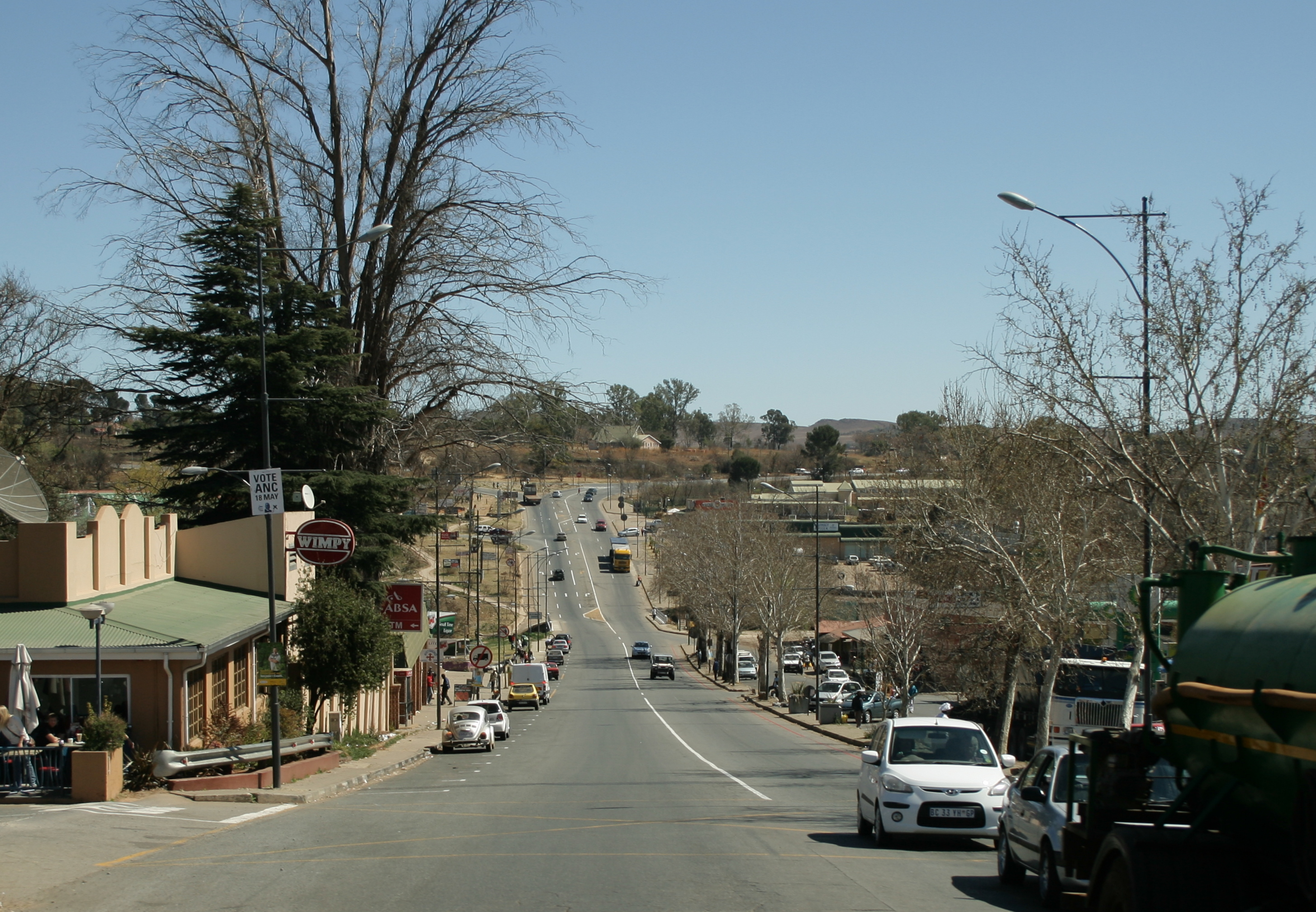
- The R24 forms the main road through Magaliesburg

- Location within Gauteng Location within South Africa Location within Africa
- Coordinates: 26°00′31″S 27°32′46″E
- Country: South Africa
- Province: Gauteng
- District: West Rand
- Municipality: Mogale City

Area
  - Total: 11.44 km^{2} (4.42 sq mi)

Population (2011)
  - Total: 6,363
  - Density: 556.2/km^{2} (1,441/sq mi)

Racial makeup (2011)
  - Black African: 91.8%
  - Coloured: 0.8%
  - Indian/Asian: 0.3%
  - White: 6.6%
  - Other: 0.6%

First languages (2011)
  - Setswana: 59.3%
  - IsiZulu: 9.1%
  - English: 7.8%
  - Afrikaans: 4.8%
  - Other: 18.9%
- Time zone: UTC+2 (SAST)
- Postal code (street): 1791
- PO box: 1739
- Area code: 014

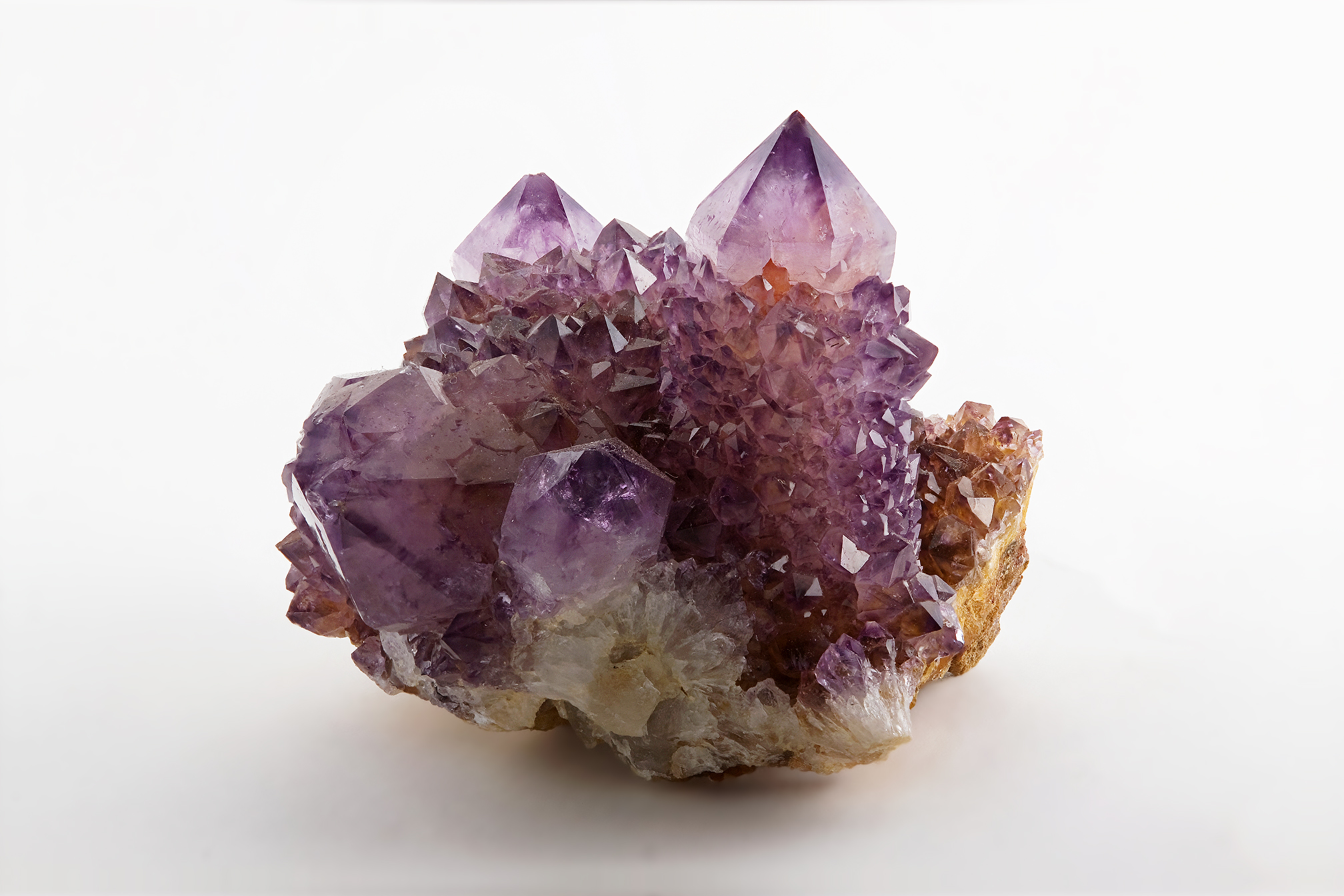
Amethyst cluster from Magaliesburg

Magaliesburg is a small town situated below the Witwatersrand mountain range in Gauteng, South Africa. The Magaliesberg mountain range is north and visible from town, hence the name "Magaliesburg". The mountains themselves are named after Kgosi Môgale Wa Môgale, a Motswana chief of the BaPô ba Mogale clan. Burg is the Afrikaans name for Town and berg means mountain.

== Tourism ==
The town and surrounds are popular holiday and weekend destinations for the residents of Johannesburg. With more than 100 accommodation venues and a great variety of activities, the small village at the foot of the Magalies Mountain is the ideal escape for city dwellers.

Magaliesburg is the home of the oldest mine in Gauteng. At The Blaauwbank mine, gold was discovered there more than 100 years ago. Besides tourism, the main income generating activity of Magaliesburg and the surrounding area is agriculture. Beef, maize, and large scale vegetable farming are most prevalent.

The village has become an attractive option for city dwellers who wish to live closer to nature. Homesteading is popular with many individuals and families going out of their way to be as self-sufficient as they are able. As this is a very difficult goal for most, there are many Magaliesburgers who live in the area but commute to Johannesburg or Pretoria for income generating employment.

For this reason, camping in Magaliesburg has become a very popular outdoor activity, attracting visitors for its natural beauty and green landscapes.
