= Carletonville =

Carletonville Merafong
- Location within Gauteng Location within South Africa Location within Africa
- Coordinates: 26°21′29″S 27°23′53″E
- Country: South Africa
- Province: Gauteng
- District: West Rand
- Municipality: Merafong City
- Established: 1960

Area
  - Total: 35.14 km^{2} (13.57 sq mi)

Population (2011)
  - Total: 23,000
  - Density: 650/km^{2} (1,700/sq mi)

Racial makeup (2011)
  - Black African: 70.1%
  - Coloured: 0.9%
  - Indian/Asian: 1.3%
  - White: 27.4%
  - Other: 0.4%

First languages (2011)
  - Afrikaans: 24.9%
  - Xhosa: 19.8%
  - Tswana: 13.2%
  - Sotho: 13.2%
  - Other: 28.9%
- Time zone: UTC+2 (SAST)
- Postal code (street): 2499
- PO box: 2500
- Area code: 018

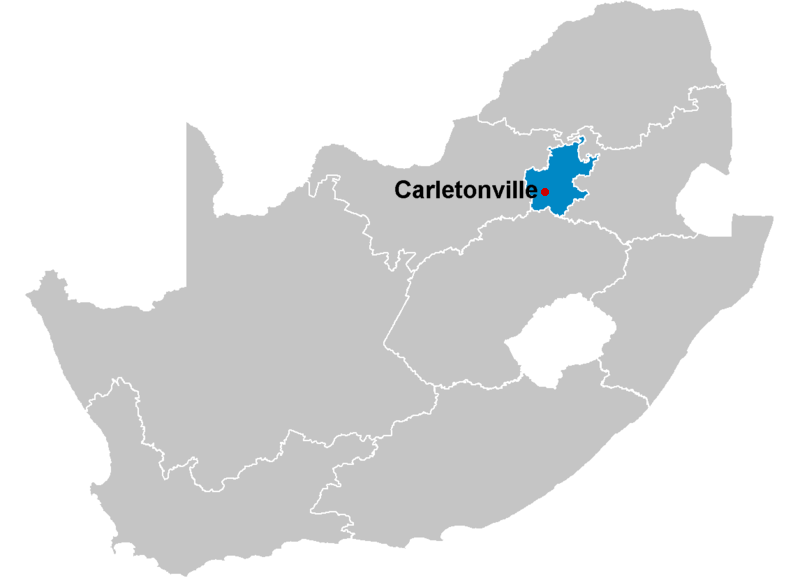
Map of Carletonville, Gauteng in South Africa

Carletonville is a town in Gauteng and the seat of the Merafong City Local Municipality in the West Rand District Municipality in Gauteng, South Africa, just north of the richest gold-mining area in the world. At 3,749 m, Western Deep Levels holds the record for the world's deepest gold mine.

== History ==
Developed by various mining companies from 1937 onwards, Carletonville was named after the long-serving mining director of Consolidated Gold Fields, Guy Carleton Jones, but was not officially incorporated until 1959. Upon reaching a population of 2000 1967, (mostly white inhabitants of the apartheid era) it became officially recognised and celebrated as a provincial town. There are several privately owned gold-mining township villages and contractor labour quarters established on mining ground owned by the various mining houses which operate in the area. The villages are located to the South of the R501 provincial road which forms the southern boundary of Carletonville. While the mining companies themselves have changed hands, or amalgamated and changed names, the mine villages situated to south are known as Blyvooruitzicht, (the oldest) Western Deep and Elandsrand. To the west and south-west is Doornfontein and Deelkraal and to the east is East Village at East Driefontein. The Town of Carletonville serves as the major shopping centre for the mine village townships. Mines are only permitted tuck shops for basic necessities, which are usually located at mine recreation centres, or on privately owned farm boundaries close to contractor labour quarters.

The site of a 3 October 2007 collapse at Elandsrand mine, is located some 11 km south of Carletonville. In 1964, a sinkhole in the former mining village township of Westdene, Blyvooruitzicht, buried the entire Oosthuizen family and their helper, alive. Situated some 5½ km south of Carletonville and being one of four village townships at the Blyvooruitzicht Gold Mine, Westdene, was consequently abandoned and then later demolished. The subsequent housing shortage was quickly normalised by extending the Southdene village township with pre-fabricated asbestos housing. Approximately 170 families were housed in caravans at the once lovely, but now derelict, Blyvooruitsicht Recreation Centre. Some of the prefabricated houses in the extensions to Southdene were erected at a distance of only 400 meters south of the sinkhole, while some pre-existing housing in Southdene and Northdene are situated even closer to the sinkhole than that. Unknown at the time, on 28 March 2008 all asbestos products would be banned in South Africa as an extreme health hazard, but many asbestos prefabricated houses in Southdene and houses containing asbestos products in ceilings and roofs all around South Africa and the World, are still occupied today.

== Geography ==
The town of Oberholzer is situated in the constituency of Carletonville & there are no distinct boundaries separating Oberholzer from Carletonville. Together, they make one city.

== Law and government ==
=== Government ===
Carletonville is the seat of the Merafong City Local Municipality and is situated in the West Rand District Municipality of Gauteng Province.

=== Politics ===
- Carletonville (House of Assembly of South Africa constituency)

== Economy ==
- The economy of the town is dominated by the villagers who live on property owned by the large gold mines surrounding the town. #It is also the home to one of the world's deepest mines.

=== Retail ===
Carletonville Mall, a 25,000m^{2} shopping complex, opened its doors in 2015 with over 85 stores. The mall is anchored by Choppies, Pick n Pay, and Woolworths.

== Notable people ==
- Brian McMillan, South African cricketer
- Jaque Fourie, South African rugby union footballer
- Joseph Dweba, South African rugby union footballer
- Jorrie Muller, South African rugby union player
- Lyle Foster, South African footballer, plays as a forward for the Premier League club, Burnley

== Twin Towns ==
Carletonville is twinned with:

- Broomhedge, County Antrim, United Kingdom
