= Koster, South Africa =

Koster
- Location within North West (South African province) Location within South Africa
- Coordinates: 25°52′S 26°54′E
- Country: South Africa
- Province: North West
- District: Bojanala Platinum
- Municipality: Kgetlengrivier

Government
  - Type: Municipal Council
  - Mayor: (ANC)

Area
  - Total: 18.22 km^{2} (7.03 sq mi)

Population (2011)
  - Total: 2,342
  - Density: 128.5/km^{2} (332.9/sq mi)

Racial makeup (2011)
  - Black African: 25.6%
  - Coloured: 1.7%
  - Indian/Asian: 9.6%
  - White: 62.4%
  - Other: 0.8%

First languages (2011)
  - Afrikaans: 72.9%
  - English: 13.9%
  - Tswana: 9.5%
  - Other: 8.1%
- Time zone: UTC+2 (SAST)
- Postal code (street): 0348
- PO box: 0348
- Area code: 014

Koster is a small farming town situated on the watershed between the Orange and Limpopo Rivers in North West Province of South Africa.

== History ==
The town was proclaimed in 1913 and named after Bastiaan Koster, the original farm owner. Koster means "church sexton".

== Geography ==
Town 58 km south-west of Rustenburg and 72 km west-north-west of Magaliesburg. It was founded on the farm Kleinfontein in 1913, and has been administered by a village council since January 1931. Said to have been named either after Dr Herman Jacob Coster (1866–1899), State Attorney of the South African Republic, after its surveyor, or after Bastiaan Hendricus Koster, owner of the farm Kleinfontein. The latter explanation seems most plausible.

The Elands River, the Koster River and the Mooi River have their sources near the town.

== Arms ==
Coat of arms of Koster, South Africa

Notes
Granted by the Administrator of the Transvaal, 31 August 1966.
Crest
A duiker's head and neck couped Proper.
Escutcheon
Vert two interlaced chevronels Argent in chief a lion rampant Or armed and langued Gules.
Motto
Eendrag Bring Voorspoed
