= Twelfth Amendment of the Constitution of South Africa =

Constitution Twelfth Amendment Act of 2005

Parliament of South Africa
- Long title: Act to amend the Constitution of the Republic of South Africa, 1996, so as to effect a technical change; to re-determine the geographical areas of the nine provinces of the Republic of South Africa; and to provide for matters connected therewith.
- Enacted by: Parliament of South Africa
- Enacted: 14 December 2005
- Assented to: 22 December 2005
- Commenced: 1 March 2006

Legislative history
- Bill title: Constitution Twelfth Amendment Bill
- Bill citation: B33B—2005
- Introduced by: Brigitte Mabandla, Minister of Justice and Constitutional Development
- Introduced: 30 September 2005

Amends
- Constitution of the Republic of South Africa, 1996

Repeals
- Constitution Third Amendment Act of 1998 (effectively)

Related legislation
- Thirteenth Amendment, Sixteenth Amendment

The Twelfth Amendment of the Constitution of South Africa (formally the Constitution Twelfth Amendment Act of 2005) altered the boundaries of seven of South Africa's nine provinces. It also redefined all of the provinces' geographical areas in terms of the areas of district and metropolitan municipalities, and repealed the provisions introduced by the Third Amendment that allowed municipal areas to cross provincial boundaries. A number of the boundary changes were highly controversial and led to popular protest and court challenges.

== Provisions ==
Areas and boundaries affected by the Twelfth Amendment

Before the Twelfth Amendment, the Constitution defined the provincial boundaries by reference to the previous Interim Constitution, which defined them in terms of magistrates' court districts and the areas of the former bantustans. The government identified two issues with the existing boundaries: the first was the existence of municipalities that crossed provincial boundaries, permitted since the introduction of the Third Amendment, which led to complications in budgeting and service delivery. The second was the boundary between the Eastern Cape and KwaZulu-Natal, where there was the large Umzimkhulu enclave of the Eastern Cape surrounded by KwaZulu-Natal, and the smaller Mount Currie enclave of KwaZulu-Natal surrounded by the Eastern Cape.

The Twelfth Amendment added to the constitution Schedule 1A, entitled "Geographical Areas of Provinces", which listed for each province a series of maps depicting the boundaries of the district municipalities that made up the territory of the province. These maps were published by the Municipal Demarcation Board in Notice 1998 of 2005. The amendment also replaced section 103 of the constitution; the original text of this section defined the provincial boundaries by reference to the 1993 constitution, while the substituted text defined them by reference to Schedule 1A.

The boundary changes which resulted from the amendment were:

- the transfer of Carletonville and Khutsong from Gauteng to the North West.
- the transfer of Groblersdal and parts of Sekhukhuneland from Mpumalanga to Limpopo.
- the transfer of Bushbuckridge from Limpopo to Mpumalanga.
- the transfer of Umzimkhulu from the Eastern Cape to KwaZulu-Natal.
- the transfer of Matatiele from KwaZulu-Natal to the Eastern Cape.
- the transfer of Moshaweng from the North West to the Northern Cape.
- minor expansions of Gauteng's boundaries at the expense of Mpumalanga and the North West.

These changes had the result of eliminating all cross-border municipalities and all exclaves or enclaves. The only provinces not affected were the Western Cape and the Free State.

The amendment also removed the provisions, inserted by the Third Amendment, that permitted cross-boundary municipalities to exist.

== Legislative history ==
The bill amendment was passed by the National Assembly on 15 November 2005. As a constitutional amendment it needed to be supported by two-thirds of the members of parliament, i.e. 267 votes. The initial vote was only 266 in favour, but on constitutional amendments the presiding member is entitled to cast a deliberative vote, which she did, raising the total to 267 votes in favour. The National Council of Provinces passed the bill on 14 December with all nine provinces voting in favour. It was signed by President Thabo Mbeki on 22 December 2005, but only came into force on 1 March 2006.

== Opposition ==
Some communities were unhappy about being transferred from one province to another; in particular the people of Matatiele and Khutsong were dissatisfied at being included in the Eastern Cape and the North West, respectively. In both cases the "new" province was seen as being less well-resourced than the "old" province.

The Matatiele Municipality, along with local community and business organisations, challenged the validity of the Twelfth Amendment before the Constitutional Court, on the grounds that Parliament had usurped the powers of the Municipal Demarcation Board to alter municipal boundaries, and that the KwaZulu-Natal Legislature had not carried out the necessary public participation before approving the amendment. (Constitutional amendments affecting a specific province must be approved by that province's legislature, and all legislative bodies are required to facilitate public participation in their decisions.) The court disagreed with the first claim but agreed with the second, ruling that the part of the amendment that transferred Matatiele to the Eastern Cape was invalid. The court, however, suspended the ruling of invalidity for eighteen months to allow Parliament to re-enact the changes with the necessary public participation. The changes were later re-enacted as the Thirteenth Amendment, which survived a similar court challenge. Some residents of Matatiele also founded the African Independent Congress as a political party to campaign against the transfer.

The people of Khutsong resorted to marches, protests (in some cases violent) and boycotts and stayaways. In the 2006 municipal elections, only 220 valid votes were cast in Khutsong despite there being nearly 30,000 registered voters. In 2009 the Merafong City Municipality, which contains Khutsong, was transferred back to Gauteng by the Sixteenth Amendment.
