= Driefontein, Gauteng =

Mine in South Africa

Coordinates: 26.3866°S 27.4968°E

Driefontein is the Driefontein Mine in the West Witwatersrand Basin (West Wits) mining field. The West Wits field was discovered in 1931 and commenced operations with Venterspost Gold Mine in 1939. In 1952, the West Driefontein mine is opened. In 1968, Kloof mine commences operations. In 1972, East Driefontein opens. In 1981, consolidation starts. In 1999, Gold Fields took control of the combined East and West Driefontein mines and merged them starting 2000 with Venterspost, Libanon, Leuudoorn and Kloof mines . In 2010, the current Kloof-Driefontein Complex, comprising KDC East and KDC West, is formed.

The place is situated in Merafong City local municipality, West Rand district, Gauteng province, South Africa. Similar census locations are East Driefontein (also/officially East Driefontein Mine) and West Driefontein, also Eastdriefontein and Westdriefontein. Similar names in Afrikaans: Oos Driefontein and Wes Driefontein, Oosdriefontein and Wesdriefontein.

The seat of the district is Randfontein. Part of the West Rand 1886 Witwatersrand Gold Rush region, although to the west-southwest of Johannesburg itself, it is part of the Johannesburg conurbation.

It does not seem the place after which the Battle of Driefontein (Second Boer War, 10 March 1900) was named. That place is described as 6 miles (10 km) south of Abraham's Kraal (or Abrams Kraal or Abramskraal).
