= Third Amendment of the Constitution of South Africa =

Constitution Third Amendment Act of 1998

Parliament of South Africa
- Long title: Act to amend the Constitution of the Republic of South Africa, 1996, so as to provide that, where a municipal boundary is determined across a provincial boundary, national legislation must make provision for establishing a municipality of a type agreed to by the provincial governments concerned and for the exercising of executive authority over that municipality; and to provide for matters connected therewith.
- Enacted by: Parliament of South Africa
- Assented to: 20 October 1998
- Commenced: 30 October 1998

Legislative history
- Bill title: Constitution of the Republic of South Africa Second Amendment Bill
- Bill citation: B85—1998
- Introduced by: Valli Moosa, Minister of Provincial Affairs and Constitutional Development

Amends
- Constitution of the Republic of South Africa, 1996

Amended by
- Citation of Constitutional Laws Act, 2005 (amended short title)

Repealed by
- Constitution Twelfth Amendment Act of 2005 (effectively)

The Third Amendment of the Constitution of South Africa made changes to allow the creation of municipalities that cross provincial boundaries. It was enacted by the Parliament of South Africa, signed by President Mandela on 20 October 1998, and came into force on the 30th of the same month. The changes it made were reversed in 2005 by the Twelfth Amendment.

== Provisions ==
The amendment added two clauses to the Constitution. The first allowed municipal boundaries to be established across provincial boundaries by the agreement of the national and the relevant provincial governments, and provided for national legislation to regulate the process. The second provided that in such municipalities, the ward boundaries were not allowed to cross provincial boundaries. Both of these clauses were removed by the Twelfth Amendment, at the same time as many provincial boundaries were altered.

== Formal title ==
The official short title of the amendment is "Constitution Third Amendment Act of 1998". It was originally titled "Constitution of the Republic of South Africa Second Amendment Act, 1998" and numbered as Act No. 87 of 1997, but the Citation of Constitutional Laws Act, 2005 renamed it and abolished the practice of giving Act numbers to constitutional amendments.
