= Matatiele Local Municipality elections =

The Matatiele Local Municipality council consists of fifty-four members elected by mixed-member proportional representation. Twenty-seven councillors are elected by first-past-the-post voting in twenty-seven wards, while the remaining twenty-seven are chosen from party lists so that the total number of party representatives is proportional to the number of votes received. In the election of 1 November 2021 the African National Congress (ANC) won a majority of forty seats.

In 2006 and 2011, the largest opposition party was the locally founded African Independent Congress, protesting against the inclusion of Matatiele in the Eastern Cape rather than KwaZulu-Natal.

== Results ==
The following table shows the composition of the council after past elections.

Event	AIC	ANC	DA	EFF	UDM	Other	Total
2006 election	10	36	1	-	1	0	48
2011 election	7	39	3	-	1	2	52
2016 election	4	38	5	3	1	0	51
2021 election	2	40	3	7	1	1	54

== March 2006 election ==
The following table shows the results of the 2006 election.

Party	Ward			List			Total seats
Party	Votes	%	Seats	Votes	%	Seats	Total seats
African National Congress	35,443	74.97	24	34,902	72.84	12	36
African Independent Congress	9,511	20.12	0	10,345	21.59	10	10
United Democratic Movement	1,293	2.74	0	1,550	3.23	1	1
Democratic Alliance	851	1.80	0	847	1.77	1	1
United Independent Front				274	0.57	0	0
Independent candidates	177	0.37	0				0
Total	47,275	100.00	24	47,918	100.00	24	48
Valid votes	47,275	96.81		47,918	96.79		
Invalid/blank votes	1,558	3.19		1,587	3.21		
Total votes	48,833	100.00		49,505	100.00		
Registered voters/turnout	85,325	57.23		85,325	58.02		

== May 2011 election ==
The following table shows the results of the 2011 election.

Party	Ward			List			Total seats
Party	Votes	%	Seats	Votes	%	Seats	Total seats
African National Congress	36,000	69.82	26	37,786	74.18	13	39
African Independent Congress	6,395	12.40	0	7,109	13.96	7	7
Democratic Alliance	2,387	4.63	0	2,481	4.87	3	3
Congress of the People	1,854	3.60	0	2,002	3.93	2	2
Independent candidates	3,844	7.46	0				0
United Democratic Movement	1,080	2.09	0	1,557	3.06	1	1
Total	51,560	100.00	26	50,935	100.00	26	52
Valid votes	51,560	96.48		50,935	94.58		
Invalid/blank votes	1,882	3.52		2,918	5.42		
Total votes	53,442	100.00		53,853	100.00		
Registered voters/turnout	89,856	59.48		89,856	59.93		

== August 2016 election ==
The following table shows the results of the 2016 election.

Party	Ward			List			Total seats
Party	Votes	%	Seats	Votes	%	Seats	Total seats
African National Congress	40,772	72.69	26	41,684	74.44	12	38
Democratic Alliance	5,349	9.54	0	4,522	8.08	5	5
African Independent Congress	4,068	7.25	0	3,918	7.00	4	4
Economic Freedom Fighters	3,815	6.80	0	3,810	6.80	3	3
United Democratic Movement	631	1.12	0	1,536	2.74	1	1
Independent candidates	1,092	1.95	0				0
African People's Convention	320	0.57	0	382	0.68	0	0
His Lordship to Save and Lead Party	44	0.08	0	145	0.26	0	0
Total	56,091	100.00	26	55,997	100.00	25	51
Valid votes	56,091	97.00		55,997	96.82		
Invalid/blank votes	1,734	3.00		1,837	3.18		
Total votes	57,825	100.00		57,834	100.00		
Registered voters/turnout	97,535	59.29		97,535	59.30		

== November 2021 election ==
The following table shows the results of the 2021 election.

Party	Ward			List			Total seats
Party	Votes	%	Seats	Votes	%	Seats	Total seats
African National Congress	36,875	72.88	27	36,982	73.04	13	40
Economic Freedom Fighters	6,038	11.93	0	5,954	11.76	7	7
Democratic Alliance	2,616	5.17	0	2,640	5.21	3	3
African Independent Congress	959	1.90	0	1,801	3.56	2	2
African Transformation Movement	885	1.75	0	881	1.74	1	1
United Democratic Movement	660	1.30	0	668	1.32	1	1
Independent candidates	1,159	2.29	0				0
Socialist Party of South Africa	299	0.59	0	353	0.70	0	0
Independent South African National Civic Organisation	364	0.72	0	286	0.56	0	0
Batho Pele Movement	349	0.69	0	250	0.49	0	0
Patriotic Alliance	124	0.25	0	168	0.33	0	0
Inkatha Freedom Party	1	0.00	0	244	0.48	0	0
African People's Convention	77	0.15	0	131	0.26	0	0
Arusha Economic Coalition	38	0.08	0	127	0.25	0	0
His Lordship to Save and Lead Party	95	0.19	0	60	0.12	0	0
Socialist Revolutionary Workers Party	56	0.11	0	88	0.17	0	0
Total	50,595	100.00	27	50,633	100.00	27	54
Valid votes	50,595	97.70		50,633	97.44		
Invalid/blank votes	1,193	2.30		1,328	2.56		
Total votes	51,788	100.00		51,961	100.00		
Registered voters/turnout	99,232	52.19		99,232	52.36		

=== By-elections from November 2021 ===
The following by-elections were held to fill vacant ward seats in the period from the election in November 2021.

Date	Ward	Party of the previous councillor	Party of the newly elected councillor
13 Feb 2025	10	African National Congress	African National Congress
