= Sixteenth Amendment of the Constitution of South Africa =

Constitution Sixteenth Amendment Act of 2009
- Location of Merafong City within Gauteng province after the boundary change

Parliament of South Africa
- Long title: Act to amend the Constitution of the Republic of South Africa, 1996, in order to re-determine the geographical areas of the provinces of Gauteng and North West; and to provide for matters connected therewith.
- Enacted by: Parliament of South Africa
- Enacted: 19 March 2009
- Assented to: 25 March 2009
- Commenced: 3 April 2009

Legislative history
- Bill title: Constitution Sixteenth Amendment Bill
- Bill citation: B1—2009
- Introduced by: Enver Surty, Minister of Justice and Constitutional Development
- Introduced: 15 January 2009

Amends
- Constitution of the Republic of South Africa, 1996

Related legislation
- Twelfth Amendment

The Sixteenth Amendment of the Constitution of South Africa (formally the Constitution Sixteenth Amendment Act of 2009) transferred Merafong City Local Municipality from North West to Gauteng, altering the boundary between the two provinces. It alters the sections of Schedule 1A to the Constitution that define the geographical areas of the two provinces. The amendment came about in response to the ongoing, and sometimes violent, protests by the people of Khutsong, which had previously been transferred from Gauteng to the North West by the Twelfth Amendment.

The bill for the amendment was introduced in the National Assembly and published on 15 January 2009. It was passed by the National Assembly on 18 February with 286 votes in favour, 2 against and 13 abstentions. It was passed by the National Council of Provinces on 19 March with all nine provinces voting in favour. The amendment was signed by President Kgalema Motlanthe on 25 March and came into force on 3 April, weeks before the 2009 general election.
