= Loopspruit river =

Loopspruit river, is a small river situated in the Gauteng and North West provinces in South Africa.

== Course ==
=== Upper Loopspruit ===
The source of the Loopspruit is situated at the hill called Losberg, on the south-facing slope of the Gatsrand mountain range about 2 km North of the mining village East Driefontein, about 10 km West of Carletonville, Merafong Municipality in Gauteng, coordinates 26°24'26.1"S 27°30'23.3"E. There are 3 additional springs South-East of that spring and South of the Gatsrand range 6.3 km, 4.4 km and 7.3 km from the main spring.

The main water source is a low discharge karst spring, although there are numerous seasonal springs in the upper watershed of the river that contribute to its flow as well as treated mining discharge.

=== Middle Loopspruit ===
The upper Loopspruit ends it reaches the small town of Fochville, it's here that it meets its first tributary, the Kraalkopspruit joining from the North, their convergence takes place at Piet Viljoen dam (Fochville dam) in Fochville. Once it passes Fochville and reaches the township Kokosi it meets its second tributary, the Leeuspruit, a seasonal river, from the South. About 2.2 km West of Kokosi the Kolgansspruit joins from the North and a further 1.2 km downstream the Losbergspruit joins from the South, from here the river starts to meander and has cut into the landscape forming a small steep-walled canyon up to 5m deep in some areas which hides the river from its surroundings, 2.5 km from there it has an unnamed perennial stream joining from the North and on directly opposite it is another unnamed stream joining from the South, the section from here also has two more tributaries joining from the North, namely the Elandspruit and Taaibospruit and several perennial streams joining from both sides, forming small waterfalls in the rain season after the heavy rains have fallen. Its after its convergence with the Taaibospruit about 1 km down-stream that the landscape starts leveling with the river and forming braided channels for about 3.5 km, where it enters Klipdrift dam, reservoir, where it converges with Enselspruit, both mouths are situated in small bay approx. 1 km wide on the West side of the reservoir where all land sides of the bay have thick reed beds making it impossible to access without a boat.

=== Lower Loopspruit ===
The lower Loopspruit starts after Klipdrift dam and ends 25 km away at the rivers convergence with the Mooi river just outside Potchefstroom. From the dam it meanders its way through agricultural fields for about 6 km thereafter it becomes wider and has steep to near-vertical slopes along its banks until it runs into a large wetland approx 2.4 km long an 1 km wide of thick reedbeds (phragmites spp.) which is part of Modderdam, which itself is overgrown with reed, making it impossible to distinguish between where the dam starts or where the wetland ends. From thereon the river becomes notably wider and meanders its final 10 km through farmlands before reaching the Mooi River.
