= City of Ekurhuleni elections =

The City of Ekurhuleni Metropolitan Municipality council consists of 224 members elected by mixed-member proportional representation. 112 are elected by first-past-the-post voting in 112 wards, while the remaining 112 are chosen from party lists so that the total number of party representatives is proportional to the number of votes received.

In the election of 4 November 2026, no party obtained a majority of seats on the council.

== Results ==
The following table shows the composition of the council after past elections.

Event	ASA	ACDP	ANC	COPE	DA	EFF	FF+	IFP	PAC	PA	Other	Total
2000 election	—	2	99	—	55	—	1	6	4	—	8	175
2006 election	—	2	108	—	45	—	2	5	3	—	10	175
2011 election	—	1	125	2	62	—	1	2	2	—	7	202
2016 election	—	1	109	1	77	25	2	2	1	1	5	224
2021 election	15	2	86	1	65	31	8	3	1	4	8	224
2026 election	40	1	59	0	66	14	11	3	1	3	26	224

== December 2000 election ==
The following table shows the results of the 2000 election.

Ekurhuleni local election, 5 December 2000
Party	Votes				Seats		
Party	Ward	List	Total	%	Ward	List	Total
African National Congress	283,150	286,003	569,153	56.5%	62	37	99
Democratic Alliance	157,875	156,622	314,497	31.2%	25	30	55
Inkatha Freedom Party	16,751	15,175	31,926	3.2%	0	6	6
Pan Africanist Congress of Azania	12,551	12,069	24,620	2.4%	1	3	4
African Christian Democratic Party	4,945	6,064	11,009	1.1%	0	2	2
East Rand Forum/Oosrand Forum	6,165	4,565	10,730	1.1%	0	2	2
Simunye in Christ Organisation	5,056	5,486	10,542	1.0%	0	2	2
Daveyton Community Peace Committee	3,169	4,567	7,736	0.8%	0	1	1
Displacees Rate-Payers Association	3,161	4,479	7,640	0.8%	0	1	1
United Democratic Movement	2,229	4,030	6,259	0.6%	0	1	1
Thembisa Concerned Residents Association	1,848	2,214	4,062	0.4%	0	1	1
Independent candidates	4,011	–	4,011	0.4%	0	–	0
Freedom Front Plus	2,105	1,543	3,648	0.4%	0	1	1
Socialist Party of Azania	333	702	1,035	0.1%	0	0	0
Regte Party/Right Party	–	413	413	0.0%	–	0	0
Total	503,349	503,932	1,007,281		88	87	175
Valid votes	503,349	503,932	1,007,281	98.4%			
Spoilt votes	8,515	8,199	16,714	1.6%			
Total votes cast	511,864	512,131	1,023,995				
Voter turnout	513,676						
Registered voters	1,137,951						
Turnout percentage	45.1%						

== March 2006 election ==
The following table shows the results of the 2006 election.

Ekurhuleni local election, 1 March 2006
Party	Votes				Seats		
Party	Ward	List	Total	%	Ward	List	Total
African National Congress	322,691	320,043	642,734	61.3%	63	45	108
Democratic Alliance	135,194	135,173	270,367	25.8%	25	20	45
Inkatha Freedom Party	14,266	14,944	29,210	2.8%	0	5	5
Displacees Rate-Payers Association	8,814	7,472	16,286	1.6%	0	3	3
Pan Africanist Congress of Azania	7,705	7,336	15,041	1.4%	0	3	3
African Christian Democratic Party	4,659	6,313	10,972	1.0%	0	2	2
Freedom Front Plus	5,146	5,496	10,642	1.0%	0	2	2
Independent Democrats	5,130	5,105	10,235	1.0%	0	2	2
United Democratic Movement	2,884	3,864	6,748	0.6%	0	1	1
Independent Ratepayers Association of SA	2,973	1,831	4,804	0.5%	0	1	1
Independent candidates	4,375	–	4,375	0.4%	0	–	0
Daveyton Community Peace Committee	1,759	1,976	3,735	0.4%	0	1	1
Azanian People's Organisation	2,052	1,534	3,586	0.3%	0	1	1
Simunye in Christ Organisation	934	1,873	2,807	0.3%	0	1	1
Christian Democratic Party	1,321	887	2,208	0.2%	0	0	0
African Renaissance Civic Movement	995	1,200	2,195	0.2%	0	0	0
National Democratic Convention	761	1,281	2,042	0.2%	0	0	0
United Independent Front	781	1,246	2,027	0.2%	0	0	0
Tshwaranang Civic Organisation	863	861	1,724	0.2%	0	0	0
Khayalami Residents Association	828	894	1,722	0.2%	0	0	0
Thembisa Concerned Residents Association	475	1,102	1,577	0.2%	0	0	0
Federal Alliance	700	689	1,389	0.1%	0	0	0
Regte Party/Right Party	45	689	734	0.1%	0	0	0
Umhlaba Uhlangene People's United Nations	213	364	577	0.1%	0	0	0
Total	525,564	522,173	1,047,737		88	87	175
Valid votes	525,564	522,173	1,047,737	98.3%			
Spoilt votes	7,665	9,955	17,620	1.7%			
Total votes cast	533,229	532,128	1,065,357				
Voter turnout	537,523						
Registered voters	1,240,348						
Turnout percentage	43.3%						

== May 2011 election ==
The following table shows the results of the 2011 election.

Ekurhuleni local election, 18 May 2011
Party	Votes				Seats		
Party	Ward	List	Total	%	Ward	List	Total
African National Congress	478,068	490,234	968,302	61.6%	71	54	125
Democratic Alliance	238,380	237,605	475,985	30.3%	30	32	62
National Freedom Party	9,332	8,938	18,270	1.2%	0	3	3
Inkatha Freedom Party	8,165	9,174	17,339	1.1%	0	2	2
Congress of the People	6,206	8,579	14,785	0.9%	0	2	2
Pan Africanist Congress of Azania	5,873	4,806	10,679	0.7%	0	2	2
African Christian Democratic Party	5,226	4,690	9,916	0.6%	0	1	1
African People's Convention	4,241	5,375	9,616	0.6%	0	1	1
Freedom Front Plus	4,655	4,011	8,666	0.6%	0	1	1
Independent Ratepayers Association of SA	6,080	2,557	8,637	0.5%	0	1	1
United Democratic Movement	4,002	3,280	7,282	0.5%	0	1	1
Displacees Rate-Payers Association	3,759	3,222	6,981	0.4%	0	1	1
Independent candidates	2,391	–	2,391	0.2%	0	–	0
The Real Congress	784	983	1,767	0.1%	0	0	0
African Christian Alliance-Afrikaner Christen Alliansie	972	603	1,575	0.1%	0	0	0
Black Consciousness Party	663	877	1,540	0.1%	0	0	0
Simunye in Christ Organisation	873	650	1,523	0.1%	0	0	0
People's Civic Organisation	832	670	1,502	0.1%	0	0	0
Christian Democratic Party	837	643	1,480	0.1%	0	0	0
First Nation Liberation Alliance	620	639	1,259	0.1%	0	0	0
National Republican Party	572	379	951	0.1%	0	0	0
Pan Africanist Movement	85	274	359	0.0%	0	0	0
Thembisa Concerned Residents Association	–	355	355	0.0%	–	0	0
Umhlaba Uhlangene People's United Nations	34	–	34	0.0%	0	–	0
Total	782,650	788,544	1,571,194		101	101	202
Valid votes	782,650	788,544	1,571,194	98.5%			
Spoilt votes	14,321	9,922	24,243	1.5%			
Total votes cast	796,971	798,466	1,595,437				
Voter turnout	804,170						
Registered voters	1,424,392						
Turnout percentage	56.5%						

== August 2016 election ==
The following table shows the results of the 2016 election.

Ekurhuleni local election, 3 August 2016
Party	Votes				Seats		
Party	Ward	List	Total	%	Ward	List	Total
African National Congress	436,190	438,961	875,151	48.6%	76	33	109
Democratic Alliance	307,664	306,709	614,373	34.1%	35	42	77
Economic Freedom Fighters	102,242	99,770	202,012	11.2%	1	24	25
African Independent Congress	14,709	14,810	29,519	1.6%	0	4	4
Inkatha Freedom Party	8,940	9,345	18,285	1.0%	0	2	2
Freedom Front Plus	7,991	8,059	16,050	0.9%	0	2	2
African Christian Democratic Party	3,908	3,754	7,662	0.4%	0	1	1
Pan Africanist Congress of Azania	3,836	3,743	7,579	0.4%	0	1	1
Patriotic Alliance	2,272	2,499	4,771	0.3%	0	1	1
Congress of the People	2,209	2,504	4,713	0.3%	0	1	1
Independent Ratepayers Association of SA	3,067	1,219	4,286	0.2%	0	1	1
Independent candidates	3,675	–	3,675	0.2%	0	–	0
United Democratic Movement	1,435	2,109	3,544	0.2%	0	0	0
African People's Convention	566	2,388	2,954	0.2%	0	0	0
Ekurhuleni Community Movement	444	338	782	0.0%	0	0	0
Al Jama-ah	109	462	571	0.0%	0	0	0
Academic Congress Union	261	250	511	0.0%	0	0	0
Palmridge Community Forum	173	230	403	0.0%	0	0	0
Azanian People's Organisation	93	304	397	0.0%	0	0	0
United Residents Front	199	190	389	0.0%	0	0	0
Pan African Socialist Movement of Azania	44	298	342	0.0%	0	0	0
International Revelation Congress	35	252	287	0.0%	0	0	0
African People's Socialist Party	148	137	285	0.0%	0	0	0
United Front of Civics	72	180	252	0.0%	0	0	0
Building a Cohesive Society	108	105	213	0.0%	0	0	0
Agang South Africa	31	164	195	0.0%	0	0	0
Total	900,421	898,780	1,799,201		112	112	224
Valid votes	900,421	898,780	1,799,201	98.3%			
Spoilt votes	16,086	15,783	31,869	1.7%			
Total votes cast	916,507	914,563	1,831,070				
Voter turnout	921,547						
Registered voters	1,587,116						
Turnout percentage	58.1%						

== November 2021 election ==
The following table shows the results of the 2021 election.

Ekurhuleni local election, 1 November 2021
Party	Votes				Seats		
Party	Ward	List	Total	%	Ward	List	Total
African National Congress	254,782	257,186	511,968	38.2%	78	8	86
Democratic Alliance	194,739	190,305	385,044	28.7%	32	33	65
Economic Freedom Fighters	92,919	89,045	181,964	13.6%	0	31	31
ActionSA	39,089	49,395	88,484	6.6%	0	15	15
Freedom Front Plus	21,330	23,318	44,648	3.3%	0	8	8
Patriotic Alliance	12,630	12,524	25,154	1.9%	2	2	4
Inkatha Freedom Party	8,335	9,885	18,220	1.4%	0	3	3
African Independent Congress	8,193	9,125	17,318	1.3%	0	3	3
African Christian Democratic Party	5,524	5,795	11,319	0.8%	0	2	2
Independent candidates	8,025	–	8,025	0.6%	0	–	0
Independent Ratepayers Association of SA	5,242	2,406	7,648	0.6%	0	1	1
Independent Citizens Movement	2,960	3,026	5,986	0.4%	0	1	1
Pan Africanist Congress of Azania	2,089	2,897	4,986	0.4%	0	1	1
African Transformation Movement	2,133	2,204	4,337	0.3%	0	1	1
National Freedom Party	1,401	1,926	3,327	0.2%	0	1	1
United Democratic Movement	1,428	1,702	3,130	0.2%	0	1	1
Congress of the People	1,511	1,340	2,851	0.2%	0	1	1
United Independent Movement	1,090	1,013	2,103	0.2%	0	0	0
African People's Convention	1,006	706	1,712	0.1%	0	0	0
Black First Land First	661	828	1,489	0.1%	0	0	0
National People's Front	714	709	1,423	0.1%	0	0	0
African People's Movement	936	433	1,369	0.1%	0	0	0
The Nationals of South Africa	491	526	1,017	0.1%	0	0	0
United Christian Democratic Party	322	680	1,002	0.1%	0	0	0
Change	544	316	860	0.1%	0	0	0
African Security Congress	165	606	771	0.1%	0	0	0
Africa Restoration Alliance	529	209	738	0.1%	0	0	0
Independent South African National Civic Organisation	243	455	698	0.1%	0	0	0
The Organic Humanity Movement	278	277	555	0.0%	0	0	0
Abantu Batho Congress	126	401	527	0.0%	0	0	0
Democratic Union Plus	151	323	474	0.0%	0	0	0
Able Leadership	100	313	413	0.0%	0	0	0
God Save Africa	–	355	355	0.0%	–	0	0
African Freedom Revolution	17	206	223	0.0%	0	0	0
Arusha Economic Coalition	15	165	180	0.0%	0	0	0
Spectrum National Party	4	153	157	0.0%	0	0	0
Al Jama-ah	138	–	138	0.0%	0	–	0
Bolsheviks Party of South Africa	37	68	105	0.0%	0	0	0
Total	669,897	670,821	1,340,718		112	112	224
Valid votes	669,897	670,821	1,340,718	98.5%			
Spoilt votes	9,879	10,113	19,992	1.5%			
Total votes cast	679,776	680,934	1,360,710				
Voter turnout	688,479						
Registered voters	1,575,840						
Turnout percentage	43.7%						

=== By-elections from November 2021 ===
The following by-elections were held to fill vacant ward seats in the period since the election in November 2021.

Date	Ward	Party of the previous councillor	Party of the newly elected councillor
24 May 2023	25	Democratic Alliance	Democratic Alliance
25 Oct 2023	23	Democratic Alliance	Democratic Alliance
14 Feb 2024	25	Democratic Alliance	Democratic Alliance
10 Dec 2025	109	African National Congress	African National Congress

== November 2026 election ==
The following table shows the results of the 2026 election.

Party	Ward			List			Total seats
Party	Votes	%	Seats	Votes	%	Seats	Total seats
Democratic Alliance	274,209	30.96	34	270,540	30.41	32	66
African National Congress	196,488	22.19	59	196,007	22.03	0	59
ActionSA	151,342	17.09	17	177,092	19.90	23	40
uMkhonto weSizwe Party	61,196	6.91	0	63,415	7.13	15	15
Economic Freedom Fighters	59,530	6.72	0	55,622	6.25	14	14
Freedom Front Plus	44,169	4.99	0	43,695	4.91	11	11
Patriotic Alliance	14,788	1.67	2	12,699	1.43	1	3
Inkatha Freedom Party	10,588	1.20	0	10,175	1.14	3	3
South African Communist Party	8,180	0.92	0	6,017	0.68	2	2
African Transformation Movement	5,872	0.66	0	6,809	0.77	2	2
Rise Mzansi	6,056	0.68	0	4,912	0.55	2	2
Afrika Mayibuye Movement	5,315	0.60	0	4,390	0.49	1	1
African Independent Congress	4,707	0.53	0	3,544	0.40	1	1
Pan Africanist Congress of Azania	4,009	0.45	0	2,985	0.34	1	1
African Christian Democratic Party	3,367	0.38	0	3,570	0.40	1	1
Independent candidates	4,949	0.56	0				0
Build One South Africa	2,858	0.32	0	2,081	0.23	1	1
The Movement for Social Justice	2,043	0.23	0	1,749	0.20	1	1
United Africans Transformation	1,533	0.17	0	2,145	0.24	1	1
Independent Ratepayers Association of SA	1,710	0.19	0	881	0.10	0	0
Move SA	1,311	0.15	0	1,167	0.13	0	0
United Democratic Movement	2,153	0.24	0				0
African People's Convention	1,016	0.11	0	941	0.11	0	0
African Heart Congress	848	0.10	0	1,025	0.12	0	0
Independent Citizens Movement	1,047	0.12	0	825	0.09	0	0
Al Jama-ah	850	0.10	0	1,020	0.11	0	0
African Congress for Transformation	1,006	0.11	0	802	0.09	0	0
Congress of the People	926	0.10	0	692	0.08	0	0
African Unemployed Congress	837	0.09	0	778	0.09	0	0
African Labour Convention	450	0.05	0	1,147	0.13	0	0
National Freedom Party	550	0.06	0	878	0.10	0	0
Service Delivery Party	858	0.10	0	519	0.06	0	0
Allied Independents Umbrella	843	0.10	0	531	0.06	0	0
South African People's Civic Organization	712	0.08	0	635	0.07	0	0
Umphakathi Kai One Party	615	0.07	0	569	0.06	0	0
People's Movement for Change	608	0.07	0	554	0.06	0	0
Africa Restoration Alliance	542	0.06	0	458	0.05	0	0
Active African Christians United Movement	246	0.03	0	608	0.07	0	0
Minority Front	340	0.04	0	458	0.05	0	0
Economic Emancipation Forum	342	0.04	0	418	0.05	0	0
African People's Socialist Party	274	0.03	0	472	0.05	0	0
Truth and Solidarity Movement	363	0.04	0	378	0.04	0	0
Operation Dudula	269	0.03	0	459	0.05	0	0
Defenders of the People	112	0.01	0	587	0.07	0	0
Azanian People's Organisation	286	0.03	0	348	0.04	0	0
Economic Liberators Forum South Africa	599	0.07	0				0
United Residents Front	331	0.04	0	245	0.03	0	0
All Citizens Party	216	0.02	0	335	0.04	0	0
Ekhethu Peoples Party	293	0.03	0	251	0.03	0	0
Movement of Residents Party	310	0.04	0	230	0.03	0	0
Labour Party of South Africa	287	0.03	0	249	0.03	0	0
United Independent Movement	218	0.02	0	307	0.03	0	0
Bolsheviks Party of South Africa	170	0.02	0	338	0.04	0	0
Azanian Ground Forces	261	0.03	0	188	0.02	0	0
Freedom in South Africa	207	0.02	0	213	0.02	0	0
Sizwe Ummah Nation	271	0.03	0	144	0.02	0	0
Organic Humanity Movement	260	0.03	0	138	0.02	0	0
Postola	219	0.02	0	143	0.02	0	0
Palmridge Community Forum	216	0.02	0	145	0.02	0	0
African Royal Rainbow Congress	54	0.01	0	249	0.03	0	0
All Natives of South Africa	194	0.02	0	104	0.01	0	0
Mawusa Movement Party	71	0.01	0	226	0.03	0	0
Mzansi Citizens' Movement	67	0.01	0	176	0.02	0	0
Ilizwe Nathi	79	0.01	0	156	0.02	0	0
Civic Movement for Progressive Citizens	211	0.02	0				0
Land Party	62	0.01	0	146	0.02	0	0
National Democratic Dialogue	18	0.00	0	187	0.02	0	0
Gap Fixers of South Africa	56	0.01	0	148	0.02	0	0
Gaza Democratic Front	55	0.01	0	148	0.02	0	0
Know Your Power	121	0.01	0	79	0.01	0	0
National Democratic Convention	136	0.02	0	61	0.01	0	0
Christ Kingdom Party	18	0.00	0	160	0.02	0	0
Tau Dia Rora Cultural and Traditional Lekgotla	160	0.02	0				0
Active Business and Civil Society Party	4	0.00	0	142	0.02	0	0
Kingdom Covenant Democratic Party	6	0.00	0	120	0.01	0	0
Merafong Civic Association	49	0.01	0	61	0.01	0	0
Lekwe Bepe Kingdom Party	0	0.00	0	56	0.01	0	0
International Revelation Congress	36	0.00	0				0
Alliance of Change	25	0.00	0				0
African Renaissance Unity	22	0.00	0				0
Resident Development	16	0.00	0				0
Rebuilding Our Own South Africa	7	0.00	0				0
Afrika Unite Congress	6	0.00	0				0
Total	885,644	100.00	112	889,742	100.00	112	224
Valid votes	885,644	97.88		889,742	98.10		
Invalid/blank votes	19,195	2.12		17,203	1.90		
Total votes	904,839	100.00		906,945	100.00		
Registered voters/turnout	1,711,998	52.85		1,711,998	52.98		
