= Maloti =

Maloti or Maluti may refer to:

- Maluti, a small town in Dumka District, Jharkhand, India
- Maloti, Eastern Cape, a town in Alfred Nzo District Municipality, Eastern Cape province, South Africa
- The Maloti mountains in the highlands of Lesotho, also commonly spelled "Maluti". On the South African side of the range it is called the Drakensberg
- The plural of Lesotho loti, the currency of Lesotho
