= Abe Bailey Nature Reserve =

Protected area in Gauteng, South Africa

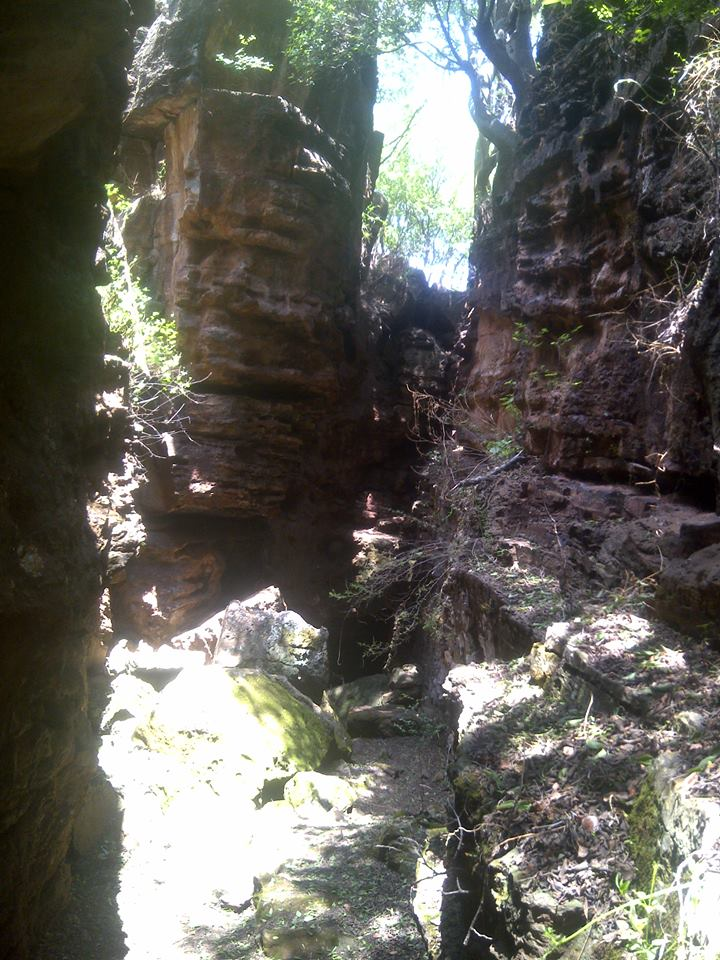
- Interactive map of Abe Bailey Nature Reserve
- Location: Merafong City Local Municipality, Gauteng, South Africa
- Nearest city: Carletonville
- Coordinates: 26.304°S 27.337°E
- Area: 4,200 ha (10,000 acres)

Abe Bailey Nature Reserve is a protected area in the Merafong City Local Municipality in Gauteng, South Africa. It is situated near Carletonville, beside the township of Khutsong on the West Rand. It is about 4,200 hectares (10,000 acres) in size.

== Fauna ==
Over 280 species of birds have been recorded in the reserve, including common sightings of the African fish eagle and the summer-visiting osprey. Thousands of flamingos visit the wetland for a few weeks a year. The yellow-billed stork has been recorded breeding in the area, one of few known breeding sites outside the Okavango Delta. Rare sightings of both the cape vulture and white-backed vulture as well as the marabou stork, martial eagle, and Verreaux's eagle-owl have been recorded.

Leopards are known to enter the area from the Gatsrand range, although this is a rare occurrence. The apex predators in the reserve are the black-backed jackal (Canis mesomelas), caracal (Caracal caracal) and serval (Leptailurus serval), whilst the cape fox (Vulpes chama) and aardwolf (Proteles cristatus) are also common in the area. Brown hyena (Parahyaena brunnae) males are known to move through the area, but no females have been recorded.

The African clawless otter (Aonyx capensis), marsh mongoose (Atilax paludinosus), yellow mongoose (Cynictis penicillata), common slender mongoose (Galerella sanguinea), white-tailed mongoose (Ichneumia albicauda), African striped weasel (Poecilogale albinucha), striped polecat (Ictonyx striatus) and occasionally honey badger (Mellivora capensis) are known from the area. The southern African hedgehog (Atelerix frontalis) and aardvark (Orycteropus afer) are also found in the reserve.

Antelope species include species indigenous to the highveld grasslands like black wildebeest (Connochaetes gnou), blesbok (Damaliscus pygargus phillipsi), red hartebeest (Acelaphus buselaphus caama), plains zebra (Equus quagga), springbok (Antidorcas marsupialis), common duiker (Sylvicapra grimmia), and steenbok (Raphicerus campestris). Occasionally, species such as the southern reedbuck (Redunca arundinum), mountain reedbuck (Redunca fulvorufula), and common warthog (Phacochoerus africanus) enter the reserve via the Gatsrand range.
