= Thirteenth Amendment of the Constitution of South Africa =

Amendment of the South African constitution regarding provincial boundaries

Constitution Thirteenth Amendment Act of 2007

Parliament of South Africa
- Long title: Act to amend the Constitution of the Republic of South Africa, 1996, so as to correct invalid provisions inserted into the Constitution; and to provide for matters connected therewith.
- Enacted by: Parliament of South Africa
- Enacted: 22 November 2007
- Assented to: 13 December 2007
- Commenced: 14 December 2007

Legislative history
- Bill title: Constitution Thirteenth Amendment Bill
- Bill citation: B24—2007
- Introduced by: Brigitte Mabandla, Minister of Justice and Constitutional Development
- Introduced: 29 June 2007

Amends
- Constitution of the Republic of South Africa, 1996

Related legislation
- Twelfth Amendment

The Thirteenth Amendment of the Constitution of South Africa (formally the Constitution Thirteenth Amendment Act of 2007) re-enacted provisions of the Twelfth Amendment which the Constitutional Court ruled had not been validly enacted. These provisions transferred the Matatiele Local Municipality from KwaZulu-Natal province to the Eastern Cape province.

The Twelfth Amendment had redefined all provincial boundaries and consequently transferred many areas from one province to another. The community of Matatiele, who were strongly opposed to their inclusion in the Eastern Cape, challenged the validity of the amendment before the Constitutional Court. Some residents also founded the African Independent Congress as a political party. On 18 August 2006, the court handed down its decision in the case of Matatiele Municipality and Others v President of the Republic of South Africa and Others, ruling that the transfer of Matatiele had not been validly enacted because the KwaZulu-Natal Legislature had not allowed for public participation, as required by the constitution, before approving the amendment. The court, recognising that Parliament might well re-enact the transfer with the necessary public participation and wishing to avoid the disruption that would be caused if the municipal elections of 1 March 2006 were invalidated in the affected area, suspended its order for eighteen months.

Parliament did indeed re-enact the provisions transferring Matatiele to the Eastern Cape, as the Thirteenth Amendment. In form, the amendment substitutes the sections of Schedule 1A to the Constitution that define the areas of the Eastern Cape and KwaZulu-Natal. The National Assembly passed the bill for the amendment on 20 September 2007 with 269 votes in favour. After the provincial consultation process the National Council of Provinces passed it on 22 November with all nine provinces voting in favour. The act was signed by President Thabo Mbeki on 13 December, and was published and came into force on the following day.
