= Elandsrand =

- Location within Gauteng Location within South Africa
- Coordinates: 26°26′S 27°22′E
- Country: South Africa
- Province: Gauteng
- District: West Rand
- Municipality: Merafong City

Area
  - Total: 12.80 km^{2} (4.94 sq mi)

Population (2011)
  - Total: 2,191
  - Density: 171.2/km^{2} (443.3/sq mi)

Racial makeup (2011)
  - Black African: 96.9%
  - Coloured: 0.7%
  - White: 2.1%
  - Other: 0.2%

First languages (2011)
  - Sotho: 32.7%
  - Xhosa: 31.2%
  - Zulu: 7.9%
  - Swazi: 7.9%
  - Other: 20.4%
- Time zone: UTC+2 (SAST)
- Postal code (street): 2499
- PO box: 2500
- Area code: 018

Elandsrand (Afrikaans for "eland ridge") is a small mining town approximately 10 km (6 mi) outside Carletonville next to Blyvooruitzicht.

== History ==
=== Trapped miners event of October 2007 ===
On 3 October 2007, 3,200 mine workers were trapped in the gold mine after an accident blocked a deep (2.2 km) shaft near the bottom. Rescuers used an adjacent shaft to rescue the miners, a spokeswoman for the mine's owner, Harmony Gold Mining, said.

Elandsrand mine is 8 km (5 mi) from Carltonville near Western Deep Levels to the East and Deelkraal to the West. It has twin shafts very close to each other, one being a production shaft, the other a service shaft for men and equipment. The incident trapping the miners occurred in the service shaft when a 15-meter section of compressed air pipe burst and fell to the shaft bottom, in the process damaging steel shaft guides, and electrical lines which cut off power to the hoist on the service cage. Because the service shaft became inoperable, miners were brought up using the production shaft, after changing out the skips for a cage. The cages in the service shaft are of a 3 deck configuration with a capacity of about 150 personnel, and are capable of operating at speeds of 50 km (31 mi) per hour. The service cage would not be able to fit into the hoisting compartments in the production shaft due to different shaft sizes, and different compartment configurations. Due to this fact a smaller cage with a slower hoisting speed was used in the skip compartments. As a result, evacuation of the trapped miners took longer than had the miners been able to use the service shaft as an egress. Eventually all the miners were rescued unharmed from the mine.

== See also ==
- Kusasalethu mine
- Merafong City Local Municipality
