= African Independent Congress =

Political party from South Africa

- President: Mandla Galo
- Founded: 12 December 2005
- Split from: African National Congress
- Ideology: Conservatism
- Political position: Centre-right
- Colours: Orange
- National Assembly seats: 0 / 400
- Eastern Cape Provincial Legislature seats: 0 / 63
- Cape Town City Council: 1 / 231

The African Independent Congress (AIC) is a minor political party in South Africa.

Founded in Matatiele on 12 December 2005, the AIC was a protest against the location of the area within the boundaries of the Eastern Cape province rather than KwaZulu-Natal as a result of the 12th Amendment of the Constitution of South Africa put forward by the ANC government. The disputed boundary change went to court; it was eventually confirmed by the 13th Amendment of the Constitution of South Africa.

The AIC won ten seats in the Matatiele municipality in the 2006 local government elections, seven in the 2011 elections, and one seat in the Eastern Cape provincial legislature in the 2009 elections. In the 2014 South African general election, the AIC received 97,462 votes, 0.53% of the total, winning three seats in the National Assembly. It retained its seat in the Eastern Cape Provincial Legislature. The party did not run a candidate in seven of the nine provinces, and was thought to have only a small, regional base. Some analysts believe the party picked up mistaken votes due to its proximity on the ballot with, and close similarities to, the name and logo of the African National Congress.

In the South African municipal elections of 2016, AIC support declined further in Matatiele, but it campaigned for the first time in many other municipalities, winning a total of 55 seats across eight of the nine provinces and 0.78% of votes.

In March 2019, in the run-up to the 2019 general election, the party's national executive was dissolved by a court ruling, the aftermath of disputes between factions supporting the party's president Mandla Galo, and deputy president Lulama Ntshayisa, over credentials for the elective congress, which took place in August 2018. The party was left with R83 in its bank account due to the legal costs, leaving its participation in the national elections in doubt. In the 2019 general election, the AIC won 48,107 votes (0.28%) and two seats in the National Assembly, one fewer than in 2014; it did not win any seats in the provincial legislatures, so losing the one previously held in the Eastern Cape.

In December 2019 following instability in the Nelson Mandela Bay Metropolitan Municipality council, covering Port Elizabeth and surrounding areas, and after the deposition of mayors from the DA and UDM, Thsonono Buyeye of the AIC became acting executive mayor.

The 2021 South African municipal elections saw the AIC win 43 council seats in seven provinces (two in Matatiele) with 0.49% of the votes.

In the 2024 South African general election, the AIC won 0.12% of the national vote, losing all of its seats in the National Assembly.

== Ekurhuleni ==
AIC member Sivuyile Ngodwana was elected mayor of Ekurhuleni in March 2023. Ngodwana's election as mayor was part of an agreement between the African National Congress and Economic Freedom Fighters whereby a councillor from a small party was elected as mayor or council speaker in order to take over various municipalities. The party won three of the 224 seats during the 2021 Ekurhuleni elections.

Ngodwana was voted out in a motion of no confidence on 28 March 2024.

== Election results ==
=== National Assembly elections ===
Election	Party leader	Total votes	Share of vote	Seats	+/–	Government
2014	Mandla Galo	97,642	0.53%	3 / 400	New	Opposition
2019	Mandla Galo	48,107	0.28%	2 / 400	▼1	Opposition
2024	Mandla Galo	19,900	0.12% (Note: From 2024, seats in the National Assembly are determined by a combination of the national ballot, and the nine regional ballots. Only the national ballot figures are shown here.)	0 / 400	▼2	Extra-parliamentary

=== Provincial elections ===
Election	Eastern Cape		Free State		Gauteng		Kwazulu-Natal		Limpopo		Mpumalanga		North-West		Northern Cape		Western Cape	
Election	%	Seats	%	Seats	%	Seats	%	Seats	%	Seats	%	Seats	%	Seats	%	Seats	%	Seats
2014	0.77%	1/63															0.31	0/42
2019	0.42	0/63	0.45	0/30	0.21	0/73	0.26	0/80	0.27	0/49	0.36	0/30	0.46	0/33	0.55	0/30	0.14	0/42
2024	0.22	0/73			0.11	0/80	0.07	0/80					0.25	0/38			0.08	0/42

=== Municipal elections ===
Election	Votes	%
2016	333,655	0.87%
2021	146,693	0.48%
