= Innocent Mdledle =

South African soccer player

Personal information
- Full name: Innocent Thembinkosi Mdledle
- Date of birth: 11 December 1985 (age 40)
- Place of birth: Matatiele, South Africa
- Height: 1.78 m (5 ft 10 in)
- Position: Left back

Youth career
- Shakes XI

Senior career*
| Years | Team | Apps | (Gls) |
| 2004–2005 | Witbank Spurs | 29 | (3) |
| 2005–2009 | Orlando Pirates | 80 | (3) |
| 2009–2012 | Mamelodi Sundowns | 39 | (0) |
| 2012–2014 | SuperSport United | 19 | (0) |
| 2014 | Mpumalanga Black Aces | 1 | (0) |

International career
| 2007–2010 | South Africa | 10 | (0) |
- * Club domestic league appearances and goals

Innocent Mdledle (born 11 December 1985 in Matatiele, Eastern Cape) is a South African retired footballer. in the Premier Soccer League and for the South Africa national soccer team. On 26 September 2007, Mdledle was added to the South Africa squad competing in the 2007 COSAFA Cup, even though he was just returning from a calf injury.

Before debuting for the national team, Mdledle was a standout player on the South African under-23 squad, known as Amaglug-glug. He was also part of the South African team at the 2009 FIFA Confederations Cup. He formerly played for Witbank Spurs, Orlando Pirates, and Mamelodi Sundowns.
