= King Edward High School =

Location
- 10 School Street; Matatiele, Eastern Cape, 4730; South Africa
- Coordinates: 30.3477°S 28.8165°E

Information
- Motto: Deus dat incrementum (God gives growth)
- Religious affiliation: Christianity
- Denomination: Non-denominational
- Established: 1902
- Founder: Miss Leary
- Staff: 50
- Gender: Co-educational
- Age range: 5–18
- Student to teacher ratio: 16:1
- Houses: Melville Graham JD le Roux
- Song: The School Song
- Accreditation: Eastern Cape Department of Education
- Website: kingedwardhs.co.za

King Edward High School (locally called KEHS) is a semi-private, English-medium high school situated in the Buxton Park suburb of Matatiele, in the Eastern Cape, South Africa. It was founded in the 1902.

== History ==
The school was established in the borough of Matatiele in 1890 by French Protestant Missionaries and the school's only teacher was a teacher named Miss Leary. It was a relatively poor school upon its foundation for impoverished white children. It was little more than a thatched hut when it was created in the 19th century.

Following the South African War, the school received its first headmaster when an Anglo-South African named Mr. Melville was appointed to be the school's first principal. The school, under Mr. Melville, was named "King Edward Coronation School" to honor King Edward VII. The construction of the present school's buildings began in earnest in 1910 and the original name of "King Edward Coronation School" was changed first to "King Edward Public School" and later "King Edward High School". In 1934 the school attained high school status. The school and the small town of Matatiele were hit very hard by the Great Depression.

In 2019, a parent accused the school of racism, with some classes composed exclusively of black children. The school said this was due to the need to teach English to non-English speakers to prepare them for later years when all instruction is in English. The alleged segregation was investigated by the Education Department.

== Admission criteria ==
Most of its students enter the school through between pre-grade one and grade four. All admissions are handled by the school directly and not the government. Students come mainly from the Alfred Nzo District Municipality. The school regularly obtains a 100% pass rate. The school educates nearly 800 learners, a large portion of whom are boarders.

== Academics ==
The school offers the following subjects in the high school:

=== Grade 8–9 ===
- Home language: English or Afrikaans
- First Additional language/second language: Afrikaans, IsiXhosa, Sesotho
- Creative Arts
- Economic management science
- Social Science (History and Geography)
- Life Orientation
- Mathematics
- Technology
- Natural sciences
- Technology

=== Grade 10–12 ===
- Home language: English or Afrikaans
- First Additional language/second language: Afrikaans, IsiXhosa, Sesotho
- Accounting
- Business studies
- Computer application technology (CAT)
- Engineering graphic design
- Geography
- History
- Life orientation
- Physical education
- Life sciences
- Mathematics
- Mathematics literacy

== Sports ==
=== Summer sports ===
- Swimming
- Soccer
- Cricket
- Tennis

=== Winter sports ===
- Athletics
- Cross country
- Hockey
- Netball
- Rugby

=== Cultural ===
- Public speaking
- Debating
- Drama
- Music
