= Matatiele Local Municipality =

Matatiele
- Local municipality
- Seal

- Location in the Eastern Cape
- Coordinates: 32°10′S 28°35′E
- Country: South Africa
- Province: Eastern Cape
- District: Alfred Nzo
- Seat: Matatiele
- Wards: 26

Government
  - Type: Municipal council
  - Mayor: Sonwabile Mngenela (ANC) (ANC)
  - Speaker: Nomasomi Mshuqwana (ANC)

Area
  - Total: 4,352 km^{2} (1,680 sq mi)

Population (2011)
  - Total: 203,843
  - Density: 46.84/km^{2} (121.3/sq mi)

Racial makeup (2011)
  - Black African: 98.1%
  - Coloured: 0.9%
  - Indian/Asian: 0.3%
  - White: 0.7%

First languages (2011)
  - Xhosa: 57.4%
  - Sotho: 33.3%
  - English: 2.9%
  - Zulu: 1.9%
  - Other: 4.5%
- Time zone: UTC+2 (SAST)
- Municipal code: EC441

Matatiele Municipality (Xhosa: uMasipala wase Matatiele; Sotho: Masepala wa Matatiele) is a local municipality within the Alfred Nzo District Municipality, in the Eastern Cape province of South Africa. It adjoins Lesotho to the north, Elundini to the south-west, and Greater Kokstad to the east and its 4,352 km² makes the Matatiele Municipality largest of four municipalities in the district at almost half of its geographical area. According to the South African National Census of 2011, its 203,483 (46.84 per km²) residents and 49,527 (11.38 per km²) households makes Matatiele Municipality the second largest populated area in the Alfred Nzo District Municipality behind Mbizana.

Once dominated by dinosaurs, wetlands and marshes, Matatiele derives its name from a portmanteau word of the Sesotho words matata, meaning "wild ducks", and ile, meaning "gone", and the Phuthi language words mati meaning "water" and ayile meaning "dried out". When taken together, Matatiele conveys a message that "ducks have flown" because of a "dried out wetlands and marshes". ^{[2]} In Phuthi, the municipality is pronounced as Matatiyela. The common informal name in any of the languages mentioned, including English, is "Matat".

Today, the Matatiele Municipality is home to quaint towns, fertile farmlands, and rural villages scattered along its sparkling streams snuggled in the shadows of the Drakensberg Mountains. Route 56, known as the shortest and most scenic route between Cape Town in the Western Cape and Durban (South Africa's third largest city) in the province of KwaZulu-Natal, is the major arterial trade route that cuts through the heart of the Matatiele Municipality in an east-west direction.

Its main economic secotrs include community services (66.4%), trade (8.9%), finance, and agriculture.

== Geography ==
The Matatiele Municipal District is mostly rural with the town of Matatiele serving as the main economic hub.

The area is located at the foothills of the Drakensberg Mountains. The settlement pattern is characterised by dispersed rural settlements surrounded by subsistence farmlands in the former Transkei region. The western parts of the area (commercial agricultural farms) form part of the high production potential land stretching from Matatiele and Kokstad in the south through the KwaZulu-Natal Midlands to the north-western parts of KwaZulu-Natal. The Matatiele Municipal district adjoins the World Heritage Site along its western boundary and was included in the Maloti-Drakensberg Transfrontier Conservation and Development Project (MDTP). The latter was a collaborative initiative between South Africa and the Kingdom of Lesotho to protect the exceptional biodiversity of the Drakensberg and Maloti Mountains through conservation, sustainable resource use, and land-use and development planning. ^{[1]}

Drakensberg Mountains have three passes that allow access from the Matatiele Municipal District to Lesotho. From west to east these are Ongeluksnek (4x4 only), then the bigger, more popular pass, which is Qachas Nek, but a little further to the east is the much more difficult and spectacular Ramatselitso Pass. All three passes end at the South Africa-Lesotho border posts of the same names and require a valid passport to cross. ^{[4]}

The Matatiele Nature Reserve is a core protected area within the Maloti Drakensberg Transfrontier Conservation Area. The north-eastern reserves reaches of the Eastern Cape near the border with KwaZulu-Natal. To the south is the town of Matatiele and to the north is the Drakensberg – the name given to the eastern portion of the Great Escarpment, which encloses the central Southern African plateau. Most of the reserve is pure grassland, although there is a meagre woodland and, along the high ridges and spurs, is the odd bit of scrub in amongst rocks and along drainage lines.

The Matatiele nature reserve was created to protect the important grasslands, wetlands and rare species of plants and includes bird-rich commonage and a wide valley known as the Cedarville Flats. It is the only reserve to formally conserve the critically endangered Rudd's lark, which needs short, dense grass cover (usually no higher than 0.6 metres) to survive. It occurs in very few locations in South Africa. ^{[5]}

== Main places ==
The 2011 census for the Matatiele Local Municipality states a population of 203,834 with these most populated main places:

Place	Code	Area (km^{2})	Population	Most spoken language
Cedarville	295185	12.4	4,412	Xhosa
Maluti	295117	4.21	7,223	Xhosa
Matatiele NU	295005	3,871.2	5,630	Xhosa
Matatiele	295171	11.2	12,466	Xhosa
Kgubetsoana	295094	5.63	3,761	Xhosa
Complete 2011 Census Data	295	4,352.31	203,834	Xhosa

== Politics ==
=== Municipal council ===
The municipal council consists of fifty-one members elected by mixed-member proportional representation. Twenty-six councillors are elected by first-past-the-post voting in twenty-six wards, while the remaining twenty-five are chosen from party lists so that the total number of party representatives is proportional to the number of votes received. In the election of 1 November 2021 the African National Congress (ANC) won a majority of forty seats on the council. The following table shows the results of the election.

Party	Ward			List			Total seats
Party	Votes	%	Seats	Votes	%	Seats	Total seats
African National Congress	36,875	72.88	27	36,982	73.04	13	40
Economic Freedom Fighters	6,038	11.93	0	5,954	11.76	7	7
Democratic Alliance	2,616	5.17	0	2,640	5.21	3	3
African Independent Congress	959	1.90	0	1,801	3.56	2	2
African Transformation Movement	885	1.75	0	881	1.74	1	1
United Democratic Movement	660	1.30	0	668	1.32	1	1
Independent candidates	1,159	2.29	0				0
9 other parties	1,403	2.77	0	1,707	3.37	0	0
Total	50,595	100.00	27	50,633	100.00	27	54
Valid votes	50,595	97.70		50,633	97.44		
Invalid/blank votes	1,193	2.30		1,328	2.56		
Total votes	51,788	100.00		51,961	100.00		
Registered voters/turnout	99,232	52.19		99,232	52.36		

=== Conflict over provincial jurisdiction ===
The town of Matatiele was part of Cape Province until being transferred to Natal in 1978. In 2005, the municipality was moved from the KwaZulu-Natal province to the Eastern Cape as part of the Twelfth Amendment of the Constitution of South Africa, over the objections of the majority of residents, some of whom in response founded the African Independent Congress. On 18 August 2006 the Constitutional Court ruled that the part of the 12th Amendment dealing with the transfer of Matatiele from KwaZulu-Natal to the Eastern Cape was invalid due to insufficient consultation with stakeholders. The situation was eventually resolved, and Matatiele was confirmed as part of Eastern Cape province under the 13th Amendment.
