= Matatiele =

- Location within Eastern Cape Location within South Africa
- Coordinates: 30°20′32″S 28°48′22″E
- Country: South Africa
- Province: Eastern Cape
- District: Alfred Nzo
- Municipality: Matatiele

Area
  - Total: 11.20 km^{2} (4.32 sq mi)
- Elevation: 1,719 m (5,640 ft)

Population (2011)
  - Total: 12,466
  - Density: 1,113/km^{2} (2,883/sq mi)

Racial makeup (2011)
  - Black African: 83.5%
  - Coloured: 9.5%
  - Indian/Asian: 2.6%
  - White: 4.1%
  - Other: 0.4%

First languages (2011)
  - Xhosa: 48.3%
  - Sotho: 23.5%
  - English: 14.3%
  - Afrikaans: 7.5%
  - Other: 6.4%
- Time zone: UTC+2 (SAST)
- Postal code (street): 4730
- PO box: 4730
- Area code: 039
- Website: https://www.matatiele.gov.za/

Matatiele is a town located in the northern part of the Eastern Cape Province of South Africa. According to the South African National Census of 2011, its 12,466 residents (1,113.44 per km^{2}) and 4,107 households (366.83 per km^{2}) make Matatiele the largest populated town in the Matatiele Local Municipality. Matatiele's area of 11.20 square kilometres (4.32 sq mi) – tucked in the shadows of the Drakensberg Mountains – is predominantly farmland, where 100% organic red meat is on offer, and tourism is a primary source of income. As one of the top 12 towns among South Africa's popular tourist attractions Route 56, Matatiele provides many activities for fishers, hikers, bikers, bird watchers, etc. Moreover, the Matatiele Museum (a former Dutch Reformed Church that opened in 1993) – displays dinosaur fossils, San peoples (also known as the Bushmen), missionaries, and town's history from its 19th century gun runners and smugglers to a quaint town filled with friendly locals serving authentic Xhosa cuisine. The majority of the town's inhabitants speak a dialect of Xhosa called Hlubi.

Matatiele is popular with upscale families looking to live in a small town with renowned schools and facilities. Matatiele is also a gateway to the Kingdom of Lesotho, which is less than a thirty minutes away from the town. Matatiele is the location of a field office of Conservation South Africa, which participates in catchment-management work linked to the Umzimvubu Catchment Partnership Programme in the upper Mzimvubu River basin.

== History ==
Evidence of Stone Age inhabitants in the form of art adorning rocks is found throughout the area.

Once dominated by wetlands and marshes, Matatiele derives its name from a portmanteau word of the Sotho language words “matata”, meaning wild ducks, and “ile”, meaning gone and the Phuthi language words "mati" meaning water and "ayile" meaning dried out. When taken together, Matatiele conveys a message that “ducks have flown” because of a "dried out wetlands and marshes". In Phuthi language, the town name is pronounced “Matatiyela”. The common informal name for the town in any of the languages mentioned, including English, is “Matat”. And those born here call it “Sweet Matat”.

In the early 1860s, the Griquas settled here after migrating across the Drakensberg from Philippolis. The town was the centre of cattle rustling and gun-running, and order was only restored in 1874 by the Cape Mounted Riflemen. The town became a municipality in 1904.

During Apartheid, white inhabitants lived in the town proper while black and coloured inhabitants lived in the adjacent townships of Harry Gwala Park, Maloti and Itsokolele and surrounding villages. Maloti and Harry Gwala Park were zoned for black inhabitants and Itsokolele was zoned for both coloured and black inhabitants. In recent years, middle-class families have sprung up in Itsokolele and Harry Gwala Park and affluent black families have moved into the town proper and into an affluent planned community called Mountain View whose construction began in the 2000s. Many still live in the affluent suburbs in the town like Buxton Park, West End and New Jay. Harry Gwala Park, Itsokolele and Maloti now fall under Matatiele Local Municipality.

The town was a part of the Cape Province until it was transferred to the Natal in 1978. In 2005, the municipality was moved from the KwaZulu-Natal province to the Eastern Cape as part of the Twelfth Amendment of the Constitution of South Africa, over the objections of the majority of residents, some of whom in response founded the African Independent Congress. On 18 August 2006, the Constitutional Court ruled that the part of the Twelfth Amendment dealing with the transfer of Matatiele from KwaZulu-Natal to the Eastern Cape was invalid due to insufficient consultation with stakeholders. The situation was eventually resolved, and Matatiele was confirmed as part of Eastern Cape province under the Thirteenth Amendment.

== Education ==
Matatiele is held in high regard for having some of the best schools in the Alfred Nzo District Municipality, King Edward High School, which performs well academically and in terms of sport and was founded in 1890s. Students from all over Alfred Nzo District Municipality come to King Edward High School, which is very selective about the students it admits. The town also has other schools held in high regard like Saint Monica's Diocesan School, Bergview College, Khanya Public Combined School and Bokamoso Primary School.

== Suburbs ==
- Buxton Park
- West End
- New Jay
- Mountain View
- Mount Lake
- Maloti
- Itsokolele
- Harry Gwala Park
- Masakala
- Tshepisong

== Notable people of Matatiele ==
- Arthur Bleksley, professor of applied mathematics and astronomer
- Emtee, hip hop musician and record producer
- Mandla Galo, president of the African Independent Congress (AIC), member of the National Assembly of South Africa
- Chris Jafta, judge of the Constitutional Court of South Africa
- Andile Jali, footballer
- Innocent Mdledle, left back footballer for Supersport United FC
- Mohau Mokoatle, actress
- Thulas Nxesi, Minister of Employment and Labour
- Ntsikelelo Nyauza, footballer for Orlando Pirates FC
- Maggie Resha, member of the African National Congress Women's League, organized meetings for the adoption of the Freedom Charter in 1955
- Siyabonga Siphika, former footballer for Bush Buscks F.C. and Maritzburg United F.C.

== Popular culture ==
- Matatiele is a South African television drama series.
