= Welverdiend, Gauteng =

Welverdiend
- Location within Gauteng Location within South Africa
- Coordinates: 26.382°S 27.282°E
- Country: South Africa
- Province: Gauteng
- District: West Rand
- Municipality: Merafong City

Area
  - Total: 9.01 km^{2} (3.48 sq mi)

Population (2011)
  - Total: 2,708
  - Density: 301/km^{2} (778/sq mi)

Racial makeup (2011)
  - Black African: 32.2%
  - Coloured: 0.8%
  - Indian/Asian: 0.4%
  - White: 66.6%

First languages (2011)
  - Afrikaans: 64.7%
  - Tswana: 12.9%
  - Sotho: 6.7%
  - Xhosa: 6.2%
  - Other: 9.5%
- Time zone: UTC+2 (SAST)
- Postal code (street): 2499
- PO box: 2495

Welverdiend is a small town in West Rand District Municipality in the Gauteng province of South Africa. Town 85 km south-west of Johannesburg, just west of Carletonville.
