= North West (South African province) =

Coordinates: 27°S 26°E

North West: Noord-Wes (Afrikaans); Bokone Bophirima (Tswana)
- Province
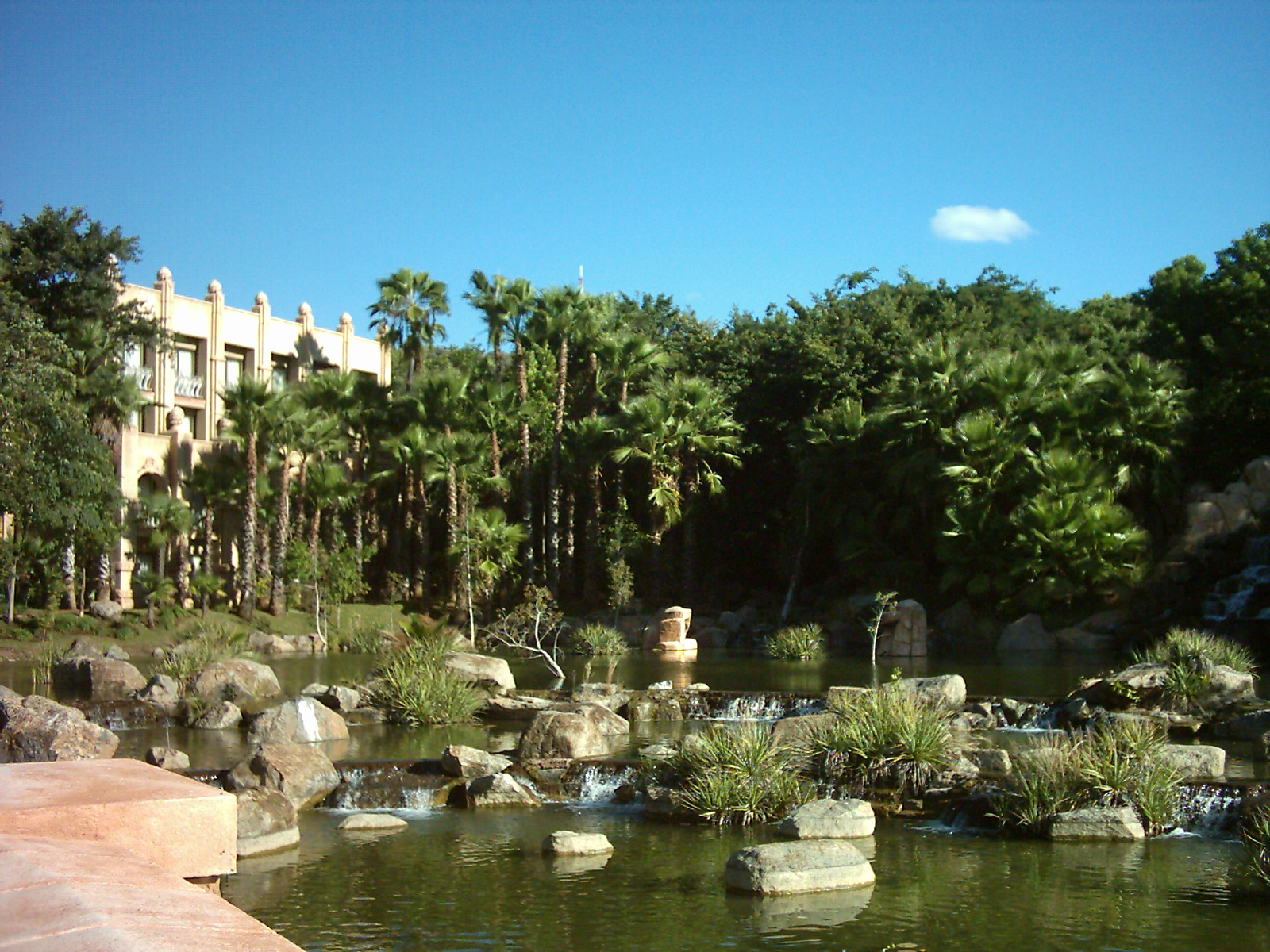
- Sun City

- Coat of arms
- Motto: Kagiso le Tswelelopele (Peace and Prosperity)
- Location of North West in South Africa
- Country: South Africa
- Established: 27 April 1994
- Capital: Mahikeng
- Largest city: Rustenburg
- Districts: List: Bojanala Platinum; Ngaka Modiri Molema; Dr Ruth Segomotsi Mompati; Dr Kenneth Kaunda

Government
  - Type: Parliamentary system
  - Premier: Lazzy Mokgosi (ANC)
  - Legislature: North West Provincial Legislature

Area
  - Total: 104,882 km^{2} (40,495 sq mi)
  - Rank: 6th in South Africa
- Highest elevation: 1,805 m (5,922 ft)

Population (2022)
  - Total: 3,803,679
  - Rank: 7th in South Africa
  - Density: 36.2663/km^{2} (93.9292/sq mi)
  - Rank: 7th in South Africa

Population groups (2022)
  - Black: 93.7%
  - White: 4.5%
  - Coloured: 1.6%
  - Indian or Asian: 0.1%

Languages (2022)
  - Setswana: 72.8%
  - Sesotho: 5.9%
  - Afrikaans: 5.2%
  - Xhosa: 4.8%
  - Tsonga: 3.1%
  - Pedi: 2.1%
  - Zulu: 1.6%
  - English: 1.0%
- Time zone: UTC+2 (SAST)
- ISO 3166 code: ZA-NW
- HDI (2019): 0.672 medium · 8th of 9
- GDP: US$26.9 billion
- Website: www.NWPG.gov.za

North West
- Zulu: iNyakatho-Ntshonalanga
- Xhosa: eMntla-Ntshona
- Afrikaans: Noordwes
- Sepedi: Leboa Bodikela
- Swazi: eNyakatfo-Nshonalanga
- Sesotho: Leboya Bophirimela
- Setswana: Bokone Bophirima
- Xitsonga: Nwalungu-Vupeladyambu
- Venda: Devhula-Vhukovhela
- Southern Ndebele: eThlangwini Tjhingalanga
- Khoekhoe: ǂOaHuri!hub

North West (Afrikaans: Noord-Wes [nuərtˈvɛs]; Tswana: Bokone Bophirima) is a province of South Africa. Its capital is Mahikeng. The province is located to the west of the major population centre and province of Gauteng, to the south of the country of Botswana, and southwest of the northernmost province of Limpopo.

== History ==
The divisions of South Africa before the 1994 reorganisation

North West was incorporated after the end of apartheid in 1994, and includes parts of the former Transvaal Province and Cape Province, as well as most of the former bantustan of Bophuthatswana. Despite its name indicating that it is in the northwest of South Africa, it is actually located in the north central region. It was the scene of political violence in Khutsong, Merafong City Local Municipality in 2006 and 2007, after cross-province municipalities were abolished and Merafong Municipality was transferred entirely to North West. Merafong has since been transferred to Gauteng province in 2009.

This province is the birthplace of prominent political figures: Lucas Mangope, Moses Kotane, Ahmed Kathrada, Abram Onkgopotse Tiro, Ruth Mompati, J. B. Marks, Rita Ndzanga, Aziz Pahad, and Essop Pahad, among others.

== Law and government ==
The Provincial Government consists of a premier, an executive council of ten ministers, and a legislature. The provincial assembly and premier are elected for five-year terms, or until the next national election. Political parties are awarded assembly seats based on the percentage of votes each party receives in the province during the national elections. The assembly elects a premier, who then appoints the members of the executive council.

The premier of North West Province as of 14 June 2024 is Lazzy Mokgosi of the African National Congress.

== Geography ==
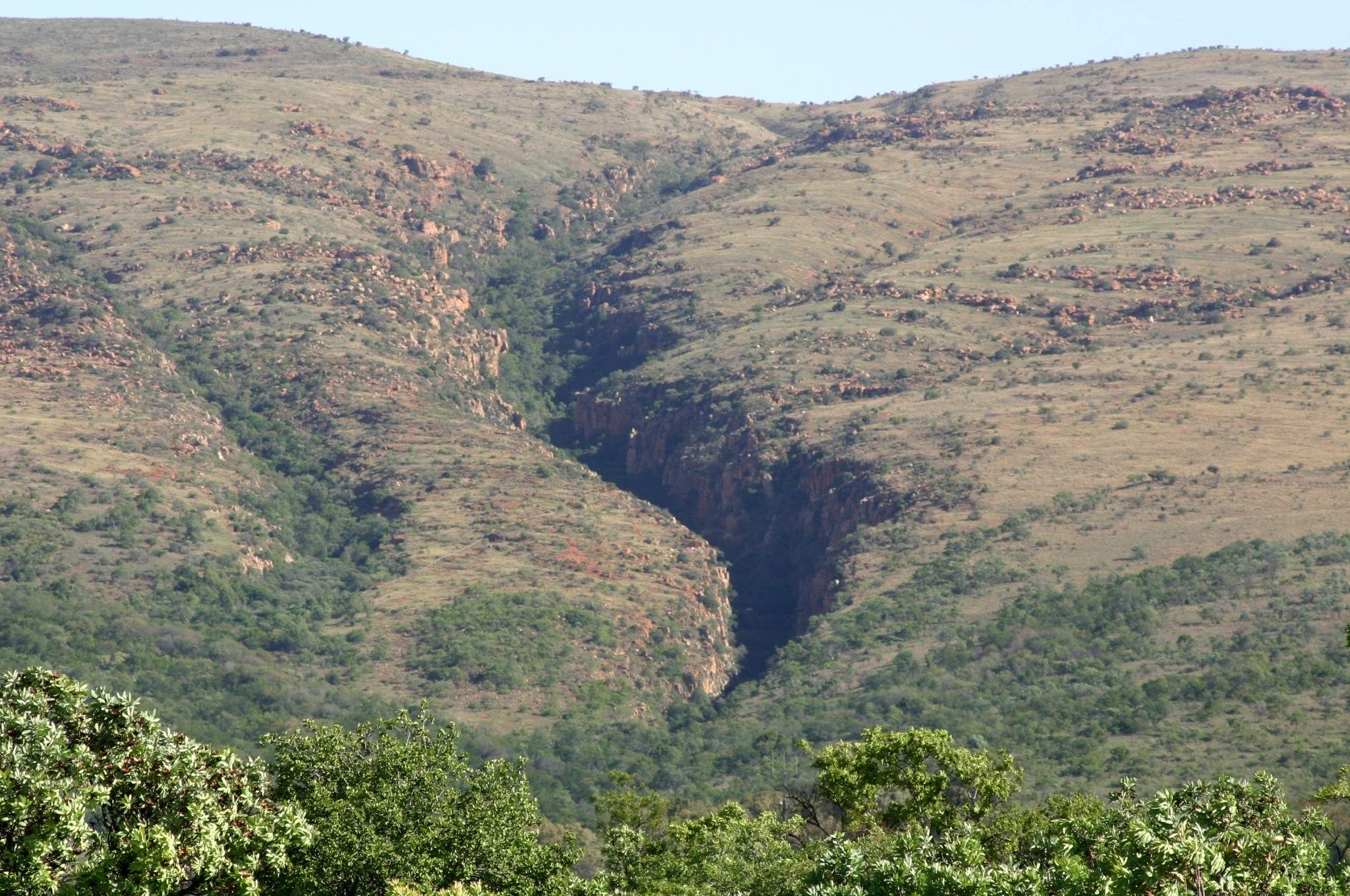
Hamerkop Kloof between Rustenburg and Pretoria on north-facing slopes of Magaliesberg

Much of the province consists of flat areas of scattered trees and grassland. The Magaliesberg mountain range in the northeast extends about 130 km (about 80 miles) from Pretoria to Rustenburg. The Vaal River flows along the southern border of the province.

=== Climate ===
Temperatures range from 17 to 31 °C (63 to 88 °F) in the summer and from 3 to 21 °C (37 to 70 °F) in the winter. Annual rainfall totals about 360 mm (about 14 in), with almost all of it falling during the summer months, between October and April.

=== Borders ===
North West borders the following districts of Botswana:

- Kgatleng – far northeast
- South-East – northeast
- Southern – north
- Kgalagadi – northwest

Domestically, it borders the following provinces:

- Limpopo – northeast
- Gauteng – east
- Free State – southeast
- Northern Cape – southwest

North West Province is traversed by the northwesterly line of equal latitude and longitude.

== Municipalities ==
North West Province districts and local municipalities

The North West Province is divided into four district municipalities. The district municipalities are in turn divided into 18 local municipalities:

=== District municipalities ===
- Bojanala Platinum District
  - Moretele
  - Madibeng
  - Rustenburg
  - Kgetlengrivier
  - Moses Kotane
- Dr Ruth Segomotsi Mompati District
  - Naledi
  - Mamusa
  - Greater Taung
  - Kagisano-Molopo
  - Lekwa-Teemane
- Ngaka Modiri Molema District
  - Mahikeng
  - Ratlou
  - Tswaing
  - Ditsobotla
  - Ramotshere
- Dr Kenneth Kaunda District
  - JB Marks
  - Matlosana
  - Maquassi Hills

=== Cities and towns ===
Population 200,000+

- Mahikeng
- Klerksdorp
- Rustenburg

Population 50,000+

- Potchefstroom

Population 25,000+

- Brits
- Orkney
- Lichtenburg

Population 10,000+

- Bloemhof
- Christiana
- Coligny
- Koster
- Letsopa
- Ledig
- Mogwase
- Ottosdal
- Schweizer-Reneke
- Stilfontein
- Ventersdorp
- Vryburg
- Wolmaransstad
- Zeerust

Population < 10,000

- Mmakau
- Mothibistad
- Reivilo
- Verdwaal

== Economy ==
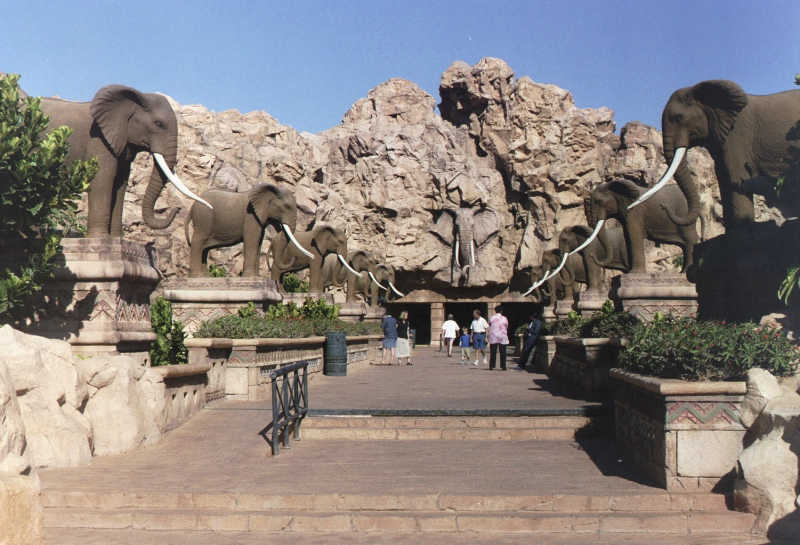
The Bridge of Time facing the Entertainment Centre, Sun City

The mainstay of the economy of North West Province is mining, which generates more than half of the province's gross domestic product and provides jobs for a quarter of its workforce. The chief minerals are gold, mined at Orkney and Klerksdorp; uranium, mined at Klerksdorp; platinum, mined at Rustenburg and Brits; and diamonds, mined at Lichtenburg, Christiana, and Bloemhof. About 85% of all money-making activities take place between Klerksdorp and Potchefstroom. The economic heart of the province is Klerksdorp. The northern and western parts of the province have many sheep farms and cattle and game ranches. The eastern and southern parts are crop-growing regions that produce maize (corn), sunflowers, tobacco, cotton, and citrus fruits. The entertainment and casino complex at Sun City and Lost City also contributes to the provincial economy.

== Demographics ==
Population density in the North West: <1 /km²; 1–3 /km²; 3–10 /km²; 10–30 /km²; 30–100 /km²; 100–300 /km²; 300–1000 /km²; 1000–3000 /km²; >3000 /km²

Dominant home languages in the North West: Tswana Afrikaans; English; Ndebele; Xhosa; Zulu; Pedi; Sotho; Tsonga; No language dominant

The majority of the province's residents are Tswana people who speak Tswana, as in neighbouring Botswana. Smaller groups include Afrikaans, Sotho, and Xhosa speaking people. English is spoken primarily as a second language. Most of the population belong to Christian denominations. (Figures according to Census 2001 released in July 2003).

According to the 2007 community survey 90.8% of the province's population was Black (mostly Tswana-speaking), 7.2% as White (mostly Afrikaans speaking), 1.6% as Coloured and 0.4% as Asian. The 2007 community survey showed the province had a population of just over 3 million. The province's white population is very unevenly distributed. In the southern and eastern municipalities, the white percentage in double figures such as the Tlokwe and Matlosana where the white percentages were 27% and 12% respectively.

The province has the lowest number of people aged 35 years and older (5.9%) who have received higher education. Since 1994 the number of people receiving higher education has increased. After the disbanding of the bantustans, many people migrated to the economic centres of Cape Town and Gauteng.

== Education ==
The province had two universities: the North-West University, which was formerly called the University of Bophuthatswana (founded in 1979), in Mmabatho; and Potchefstroom University for Christian Higher Education (founded in 1869; became a constituent college of the University of South Africa in 1921 and an independent university in 1951). These two universities have now merged and the new institution is called North-West University.

As part of the Department of Education's proposed plans for higher education, the existing four higher learning institutions will be merged to form two. During 2003, as part of the Year of Further Education and Training project, three mega institutions, Taletso, ORBIT and Vuselela, were established to provide technical and vocational training to the youth. These institutions have been incorporated into many of the former education and technical colleges and manpower centres.

== Sports ==
- Basketball
  - North West Eagles (Potchefstroom)
- Rugby union
  - Platinum Leopards (Rustenburg)
- Soccer
  - Platinum Stars (dissolved) (Rustenburg)

== See also ==
- List of cities and towns in the North West Province
- List of speakers of the North West Provincial Legislature
- Provinces of South Africa
