= Kusasalethu mine =

Gold mine in South Africa

Kusasalethu
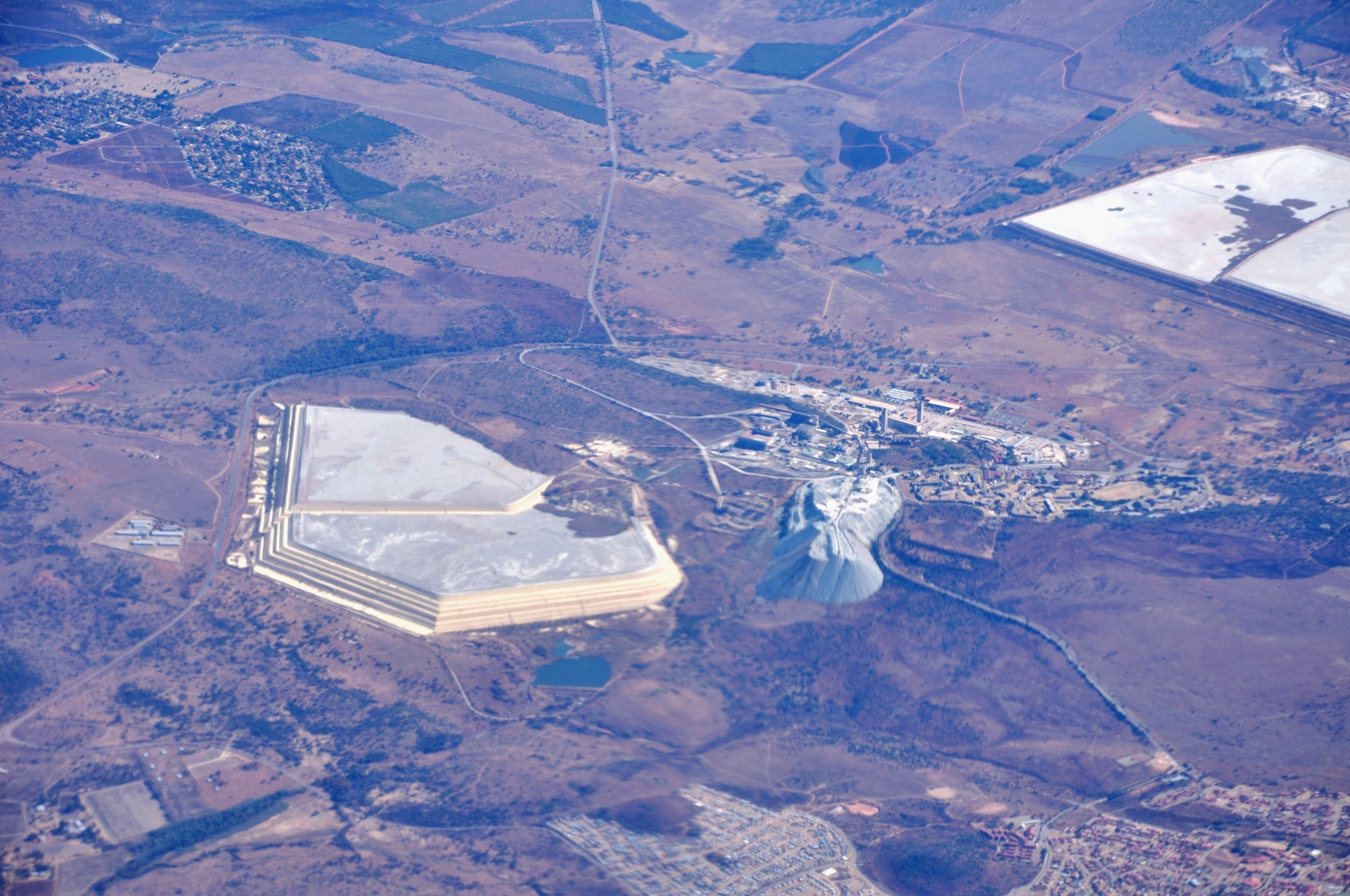

- Location in South Africa
- Location: Carletonville, Gauteng, South Africa; 26°27′14″S 27°21′33″E
- Production: 158,631
- Financial year: 2008
- Company: Harmony Gold
- Website: Harmony Gold website
- Acquired: 2001

Kusasalethu (formerly Elandskraal, an amalgamation of Elandsrand and Deelkraal mines) is a gold mine on the West Wits Line near Carletonville, Gauteng, South Africa, and 75 km (47 mi) west of Johannesburg. The Deelkraal Section of the mine is situated about 5 km (3.1 mi) to the west at 26°28′03″S 27°18′36″E.

== Overview ==
The mine is owned by the Harmony Gold Mining Co. Ltd. and is the amalgamation of the Deelkraal mine and Elandsrand mines, bought from AngloGold in 2001 for R1 billion in cash.

Kusasalethu mines mainly the Ventersdorp Contact Reef (VCR) and the Carbon Leader. Production in 2007 was 195,000 ounces, proven and probable reserves totalled 8.3 million ounces and additional identified resources totalled 7.1 million ounces. An R989 million (US$137 million) project to develop a deeper 'new mine' to exploit the VCR between 3,000 and 3,600 metres (9,800 and 11,800 ft) below surface is well advanced. It is expected to be complete in 2010 and boost annual production to 416,000 ounces.

On 3 October 2007 3,200 employees were trapped underground when a 15-metre (49 ft) compressed air pipe broke away just below surface in the men and material shaft and fell to the shaft bottom, severely damaging both the shaft steelwork and the electricity supply to the sub men and material shaft. The trapped workers were all brought to surface by 4.00 p.m. the following day after cages had been installed in the rock shaft. 48 days of production were lost.

In late 2014, the mine was shut down for two weeks as part of efforts to clear illegal miners from working.

== Production ==
Recent production figures:

Year	Production	Grade	Cost per ounce
2006	170,867 ounces	5.94 g/t	US $523
2007	194,710 ounces	5.98 g/t	US $527
2008	158,631 ounces	5.54 g/t	US $652
2009			

== See also ==
- Elandsrand township
