= Merafong City Local Municipality =

Merafong City
- Local municipality
- Seal

- Location of Merafong City Local Municipality within Gauteng
- Coordinates: 26°25′S 27°25′E
- Country: South Africa
- Province: Gauteng
- District: West Rand
- Seat: Carletonville
- Wards: 28

Government
  - Type: Municipal council
  - Mayor: Nozuko Best (ANC)

Area
  - Total: 1,631 km^{2} (630 sq mi)

Population (2011)
  - Total: 197,520
  - Density: 121.1/km^{2} (313.7/sq mi)

Racial makeup (2011)
  - Black African: 86.5%
  - Coloured: 1.1%
  - Indian/Asian: 0.3%
  - White: 11.8%

First languages (2011)
  - Xhosa: 24.9%
  - Tswana: 21.4%
  - Sotho: 19.3%
  - Afrikaans: 12.8%
  - Other: 21.6%
- Time zone: UTC+2 (SAST)
- Municipal code: GT484

Merafong City Municipality (Xhosa: uMasipala weSixeko saseMerafong; Tswana: Mmasepala wa Merafong City; Sotho: Masepala wa Merafong City; Afrikaans: Merafong City Munisipaliteit) is a local municipality in the West Rand District Municipality, in the Gauteng province of South Africa. Its boundaries encloses some of the richest gold mines in the world. It is situated about 65 km from Johannesburg and is serviced by a number of major roads, including the N12 from Johannesburg to Kimberley and the N14 from Krugersdorp to Vryburg.

Formerly a cross-border municipality, the entire municipality was transferred to the North West province following the abolition of cross-border municipalities by an amendment to the South African Constitution in 2005. The municipality was a part of the North West province from 2005 to 2009, when it was reincorporated into Gauteng by another amendment to the Constitution. This transfer was necessitated as a result of often violent protests in the township of Khutsong.

Merafong's historical development is closely knit with the discovery of rich gold deposits in the early 1930s.

== Towns ==
Fochville is the oldest town in the region and was declared a town in 1951.

The town of Carletonville was named after Guy Carleton Jones, an engineer from the Gold Fields Ltd mining company, who played a prominent role in the discovery of the West Wits gold field, of which Carletonville forms a part. The mining company decided in November 1946 to establish the town. Carletonville was proclaimed in 1948 and attained Town Council Status on 1 July 1959.

Wedela is situated in between Western Deep Levels and Elandsrand mine. The town's name is derived from the prefixes of the two mines: the "Wed-" from Western Deep Levels and the "-ela" from Elandsrand. Wedela was established as a mining village in December 1978 by Harry Oppenheimer, and municipal status was granted to the town on 1 January 1990.

Attached to Fochville and Carletonville are the towns of Khutsong, Kokosi, Greenspark, Welverdiend, and Blybank.

== Main places ==
The 2001 census divided the municipality into the following main places:

Place	Code	Area (km^{2})	Population	Most spoken language
Blybank	78801	6.90	471	Zulu
Blyvooruitzicht	78802	6.31	6,461	Xhosa
Carletonville	78803	12.67	18,364	Afrikaans
Deelkraal	78804	9.41	3,356	Afrikaans
Doornfontein	78805	1.51	2,575	Xhosa
East Driefontein Mine	78806	2.03	11,481	Xhosa
Elandsfontein	68801	0.43	5,256	Sotho
Elandsrand	68802	0.19	1,786	Sotho
Elandsridge	78807	2.78	2,881	Afrikaans
Fochville	68803	9.53	11,344	Afrikaans
Khutsong	78808	8.60	69,858	Tswana
Kokosi	68804	4.90	23,062	Tswana
Leeupoort	68805	0.30	1,176	Sotho
Letsatsing	78809	0.76	1,511	Xhosa
Oberholzer	78811	3.09	5,368	Afrikaans
Phomolong	78812	0.25	947	Xhosa
Wedela	68807	2.18	14,159	Xhosa
Welverdiend	78813	4.06	2,226	Afrikaans
Westdriefontein	78814	38.29	4,792	Sotho
Western Deep Levels Mine	78815	44.72	11,274	Sotho
Remainder of the municipality	78810 + 68806	1,471.53	12,144	

== Politics ==
The municipal council consists of forty-nine members elected by mixed-member proportional representation. Twenty-five councillors are elected by first-past-the-post voting in twenty-five wards, while the remaining twenty-four are chosen from party lists so that the total number of party representatives is proportional to the number of votes received.

In the election of 4 November 2026 no party won a majority. The African National Congress (ANC) won the most seats.

The following table shows the results of the election.

Party	Ward			List			Total seats
Party	Votes	%	Seats	Votes	%	Seats	Total seats
African National Congress	16,138	33.53	17	16,525	34.32	0	17
Democratic Alliance	11,056	22.97	7	11,100	23.06	4	11
Economic Freedom Fighters	4,225	8.78	0	4,190	8.70	4	4
One Merafong Organisation	4,111	8.54	1	4,019	8.35	3	4
uMkhonto weSizwe Party	2,421	5.03	0	2,509	5.21	3	3
Freedom Front Plus	2,113	4.39	0	2,159	4.48	2	2
ActionSA	1,669	3.47	0	1,797	3.73	2	2
South African Communist Party	1,389	2.89	0	1,250	2.60	1	1
Labour Party of South Africa	1,310	2.72	0	1,317	2.74	1	1
Inkatha Freedom Party	634	1.32	0	616	1.28	1	1
African Independent Congress	647	1.34	0	392	0.81	1	1
Patriotic Alliance	438	0.91	0	421	0.87	1	1
Pan Africanist Congress of Azania	290	0.60	0	540	1.12	1	1
Independent candidates	690	1.43	0				0
10 other parties	1,000	2.08	0	1,309	2.72	0	0
Total	48,131	100.00	25	48,144	100.00	24	49
Valid votes	48,131	97.38		48,144	97.07		
Invalid/blank votes	1,296	2.62		1,455	2.93		
Total votes	49,427	100.00		49,599	100.00		
Registered voters/turnout	98,869	49.99		98,869	50.17		

== Management ==
The power utility Eskom has identified Merafong as a municipality with a poor payment record. Its debt with Eskom rose from over R570 million in 2021 to R700 million in 2022 when they were in discussions with the utility to address the monthly shortfalls.
