= Khutsong =

- Location within Gauteng Location within South Africa
- Coordinates: 26°20′1″S 27°19′39″E
- Country: South Africa
- Province: Gauteng
- District: West Rand
- Municipality: Merafong City

Government
  - Councillor: Ofentse Hamilton Kawe

Area
  - Total: 16.15 km^{2} (6.24 sq mi)

Population (2011)
  - Total: 62,458
  - Density: 3,867/km^{2} (10,020/sq mi)

Racial makeup (2011)
  - Black African: 99.4%
  - Coloured: 0.3%
  - Indian/Asian: 0.1%
  - White: 0.1%
  - Other: 0.1%

First languages (2011)
  - Tswana: 34.8%
  - Xhosa: 25.0%
  - Sotho: 19.3%
  - Zulu: 7.3%
  - Other: 13.6%
- Time zone: UTC+2 (SAST)
- Postal code (street): 2499
- PO box: 2500

Khutsong is a township on the West Rand of South Africa, and scene of widespread unrest starting in February 2006. It is situated north-west of the town of Carletonville, in the Merafong City Local Municipality of the Gauteng province, just west of the Abe Bailey Nature Reserve. With a terrible history of violence and gangsterism, the main factors causing crime rates to spike up from 2011 until late 2019 are mainly high poverty rates, municipality mismanagement and corruption and the lack of employment/job creating opportunities. In 2017/18 thousands of mine workers lost their jobs due to mines shutting down.

== Climate ==
Köppen-Geiger climate classification system classifies its climate as subtropical highland (Cwb). Summer days are generally warm or slightly hot, summer nights are mild, while winter days are warm and winter nights are cool. Most of the rain falls in summer.

Climate data for Khutsong
Month	Jan	Feb	Mar	Apr	May	Jun	Jul	Aug	Sep	Oct	Nov	Dec	Year
Mean daily maximum °C (°F)	25.8 (78.4)	24.8 (76.6)	24.6 (76.3)	23.9 (75.0)	22.2 (72.0)	20.1 (68.2)	20.1 (68.2)	22 (72)	24.1 (75.4)	25.5 (77.9)	25.5 (77.9)	25.7 (78.3)	23.7 (74.7)
Daily mean °C (°F)	20.5 (68.9)	19.9 (67.8)	19.3 (66.7)	17.7 (63.9)	15.1 (59.2)	12.5 (54.5)	12.6 (54.7)	14.3 (57.7)	16.6 (61.9)	18.6 (65.5)	19.5 (67.1)	20.1 (68.2)	17.2 (63.0)
Mean daily minimum °C (°F)	15.2 (59.4)	15.1 (59.2)	14.1 (57.4)	11.6 (52.9)	8 (46)	5 (41)	5.1 (41.2)	6.6 (43.9)	9.2 (48.6)	11.8 (53.2)	13.6 (56.5)	14.6 (58.3)	10.8 (51.5)
Average precipitation mm (inches)	171 (6.7)	174 (6.9)	116 (4.6)	67 (2.6)	19 (0.7)	15 (0.6)	11 (0.4)	12 (0.5)	32 (1.3)	63 (2.5)	124 (4.9)	163 (6.4)	967 (38.1)
Source: Climate-Data.org, altitude: 1226m

== Local events ==
=== Riots ===
Following the abolition of cross-border municipalities, the entire Merafong City Local Municipality which includes Khutsong, was transferred from the West Rand District Municipality in Gauteng Province to the Southern District Municipality in the North West Province. The residents of Khutsong objected to the transfer from wealthy Gauteng to the poorer North West. Only 123 votes were cast in the local government elections held on 1 March 2006.

Actions taken by residents included an application to the Pretoria High Court and violent incidents, including petrol bombing the homes of African National Congress candidates, blocking roads and the destruction of municipal property.

One important element in the Khutsong issue relates to environmental security. The Khutsong community is physically located alongside some of the richest gold mines in the world. Recent research conducted by the Water Research Commission in South Africa has shown that heavy metal and radionuclide contamination is closely associated with rivers and wetlands downstream of major mining operations. The Khutsong community is located in such an aquatic ecosystem, so the environmental dimension to this conflict is an important and largely unexplored one.

On 27 April 2007 when President Thabo Mbeki was celebrating Freedom Day at Bhisho renewed riots reminiscent of those which occurred in Soweto on 16 June 1976 took place in the streets of Khutsong.

On 4 December 2008 it was announced that Khutsong and the rest of the Merafong Municipality would be reintegrated into the Gauteng Province. The passage of the Sixteenth Amendment to the Constitution of South Africa, altering the provincial boundaries accordingly, came into effect on 3 April 2009.

=== Vigilantism ===
On the 3 November 2013 number of vigilante mobs totalling around 700 people attacked alleged gang members across Khutsong. Six people died in the attacks including five alleged gangsters and one sangoma believed to have been giving the gangsters muti and moral support.

It is reported that the event took place as a result of high levels of violent crime and the ongoing abduction of young girls as well as the recruitment of school children into the gangs. Local community members tried to organise a meeting with the police but were unable to gain an audience with them, after which they organised a meeting of their own to discuss the gang problem. One of the largest of the local gangs, the Casanovas, then sought to break-up the meeting by sending over one hundred gang members to beat people at the meeting. Twenty people were injured and this led the community to regroup and vow revenge and the vigilante mob was formed. Arrests were never made.

== See also ==
- COSATU
- SACP
- South African municipal election, 2006
