= Maloti, South Africa =

Maloti Maluti
- Location within Eastern Cape Location within South Africa
- Coordinates: 30.260°S 28.791°E
- Country: South Africa
- Province: Eastern Cape
- District: Alfred Nzo
- Municipality: Matatiele

Area
  - Total: 4.21 km^{2} (1.63 sq mi)

Population (2011)
  - Total: 7,223
  - Density: 1,720/km^{2} (4,440/sq mi)

Racial makeup (2011)
  - Black African: 99.3%
  - Coloured: 0.3%
  - Indian/Asian: 0.2%
  - White: 0.1%
  - Other: 0.1%

First languages (2011)
  - Xhosa: 49.0%
  - Sotho: 44.7%
  - English: 1.3%
  - Zulu: 1.2%
  - Other: 3.8%
- Time zone: UTC+2 (SAST)
- Postal code (street): 4740
- PO box: 4740
- Area code: 039

Maloti (formerly named Maluti) is a middle-class township of Matatiele Local Municipality in Alfred Nzo District Municipality in the Eastern Cape province of South Africa.

Maloti, once a village, is now a rapidly developing township. The township comprises Sotho, Hlubi, Phuthi and small Xhosa groups. Most residents in the area are either bilingual or multilingual. The township comprises many sections, namely Tholang, Motsekuwa, Ramohlakoana, Protea, Hardingberg, Malubaluba and Donald's Drift. Maloti is highly admired for the mountain ranges that surround it.

== History ==
There is very little history recorded about Maloti. Maloti started as a small village that gradually grew during the Apartheid era when it was zoned to house the black inhabitants of Matatiele.

== Development ==
Maloti was already developing during Apartheid, but it saw even greater development in the 2000s. The township has facilities like a petrol station, hotels, shops, schools, a civic center, a hall, a library, a post office, a clinic, a police station, a magistrates court and municipal offices that make it self-sufficient and independent from Matatiele. Affluent black families send their children to the Model C schools in Matatiele. The township once had a fully functional university, the University of Transkei (Maluti College of Education) The old university buildings have been converted into district offices.

== Culture ==
Traditional culture is slowly phasing out within Maloti as it gentrifies. Maloti's culture is heavily influenced by Western culture, in line with the rest of South Africa.
