= West Driefontein =

- Location within Gauteng Location within South Africa
- Coordinates: 26°23′S 27°26′E
- Country: South Africa
- Province: Gauteng
- District: West Rand
- Municipality: Merafong City

Area
  - Total: 47.54 km^{2} (18.36 sq mi)

Population (2011)
  - Total: 2,857
  - Density: 60.10/km^{2} (155.6/sq mi)

Racial makeup (2011)
  - Black African: 97.1%
  - Coloured: 1.3%
  - Indian/Asian: 0.4%
  - White: 1.2%

First languages (2011)
  - Sotho: 28.4%
  - Xhosa: 27.2%
  - Tsonga: 15.0%
  - Zulu: 13.8%
  - Other: 15.6%
- Time zone: UTC+2 (SAST)

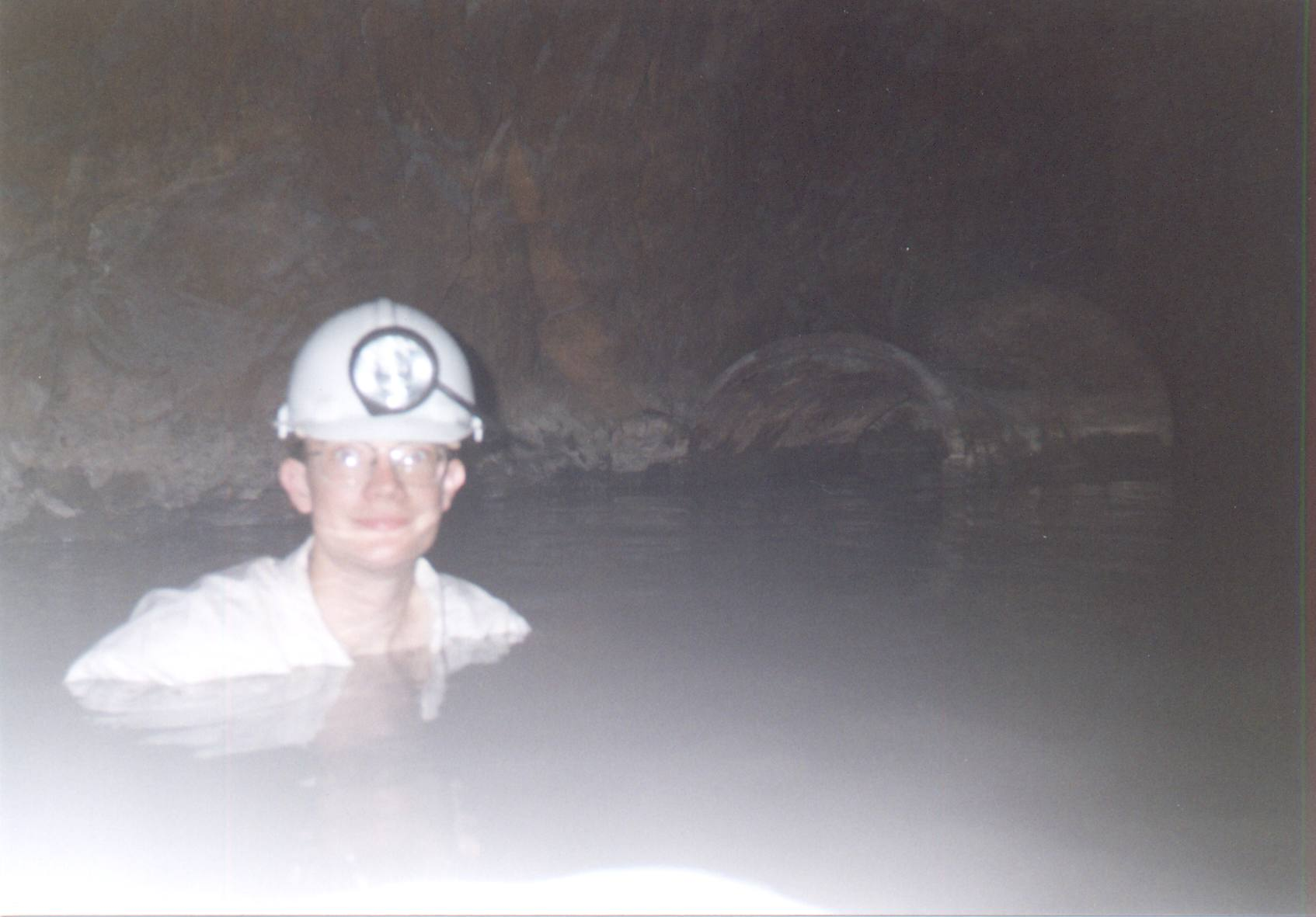
Flooded level, West Driefontein mine, South Africa. The dolomite overlying the gold reefs hosts much groundwater, giving the mines flooding problems.

West Driefontein was a South African gold mining company belonging to the Goldfields Group (now Sibanye Gold).

It lies approximately 10 kilometres (6.2 mi) outside Carletonville next to Blyvooruitsig and East Driefontein. It used to be the richest gold mine in the world before it was flooded by water.
