= Mandla Galo =

South African politician

Member of the National Assembly of South Africa
- In office 21 May 2014 – 28 May 2024

Personal details
- Born: Mandlenkosi Phillip Galo; 5 July 1962 (age 63)
- Party: African Independent Congress
- Profession: Politician

Mandlenkosi Phillip Galo (born 5 July 1962) is a South African politician who serves as the inaugural president of the African Independent Congress (AIC), a party he and other disgruntled ANC members founded over a demarcation dispute in 2005. He was elected to the National Assembly of South Africa in 2014 and won re-election to a second term in 2019.

The AIC lost its parliamentary representation in the 2024 general election, ending Galo's tenure as a member of parliament.
