= Verdwaal =

- Suburb
- Location within South Africa
- Coordinates: 26.09648°S 25.8894°E
- Country: South Africa

Verdwaal is a small Village along National Road R503 in the country of South Africa in the North West Province, settled near the border of the larger township of Itsoseng. Verdwaal is approximately 36.3 km (22.6 mi) from the regional capital of North West, Mahikeng. The name of the Village is in reference to the Afrikaans word 'verdwaal', which means 'to get lost or 'to go astray'.

== See also ==
- Economy of South Africa
- History of South Africa
