= Municipal Demarcation Board =

South African government agency responsible for municipal boundary demarcation

Agency overview
- Formed: April 1, 2018; 8 years ago
- Preceding Agency: The Demarcation Board (national)
- Jurisdiction: South Africa
- Status: Active
- Headquarters: Pretoria, Gauteng, South Africa
- Agency executives: Thabo Manyoni (Chairperson); David Mohale (Deputy Chairperson)
- Key document: The Local Government: Municipal Demarcation Act, 1998
- Website: demarcation.org.za

The Municipal Demarcation Board (MDB) is an independent authority responsible for demarcating the boundaries of South African districts and municipalities, as well as delimiting and the boundaries of the electoral wards (voting districts) within those municipalities.

South African municipal boundaries in 2016, as demarcated by the Municipal Demarcation Board

== History ==
Prior to the establishment of the South African national Demarcation Board in 1999, the determination of municipal boundaries for the 1995-96 local elections was done in accordance with the Local Government Transition Act, No 209 of 1993.

In 1995/96, a total of 1,262 local government bodies across the country were amalgamated into 843 local authorities (now known as municipalities in terms of legislation enacted after the promulgation of the 1996 Constitution of South Africa).

The Municipal Demarcation Board (MDB) was envisaged in section 155.(2)(b) of the Constitution, and created, as an independent body, by the Local Government: Municipal Demarcation Act, 1998.

== Mandate ==
The MDB's mandate pertaining to the determination of municipal boundaries is provided for in the Local Government: Municipal Demarcation Act, 1998, and its mandate pertaining to ward delimitation, capacity assessments, and district management areas is established in the Local Government: Municipal Structures Act, 1998. The MDB has the following mandate:

- Determining and re-determining of municipal boundaries
- Delimiting of wards for local elections
- Assessing of the capacity of district and local municipalities to perform their functions, as provided for in the Constitution, and the Structures Act
- Declaring and withdrawing of the declaration of district management areas
- Assisting Government Departments in aligning their functional service delivery boundaries to municipal boundaries

== Municipal boundary determination process ==
The process of demarcating municipal boundaries begins with the initiation of boundary redetermination as per the MDA, followed by publication as per the MDA, and considerations of Section 26 of the MDA.

This is followed by determining boundaries, conducting public meetings, or conducting formal investigations. A combination of these may be used. Reports are then considered, and a decision is made as to whether boundaries will be redetermined.

Objections are then considered, and a final decision is made. Finally, the decision is published in the provincial gazette, as per the MDA.

== See also ==
- Elections in South Africa
- Electoral Commission of South Africa
- Municipalities of South Africa
