= Municipalities of South Africa =

Local government structure in South Africa

The Municipalities of South Africa as of 2016

Local government in South Africa consists of municipalities (Tswana: bommasepala; Sotho: bomasepala; Northern Sotho: bommasepala; Afrikaans: munisipaliteite; Zulu: ngomasipala; Southern Ndebele: bomasipala; Xhosa: oomasipala; Swazi: bomasipala; Venda: vhomasipala; Tsonga: vamasipala) of various types. The largest metropolitan areas are governed by metropolitan municipalities, while the rest of the country is divided into counties called district municipalities, each of which consists of several boroughs called local municipalities. Since the boundary reform at the time of the municipal election of 3 August 2016 there are eight metropolitan municipalities, 44 district municipalities and 205 local municipalities.

== Categories ==
Municipalities can belong to one of three categories: metropolitan, district and local (referred to in the constitution as categories A, C and B).

=== Metropolitan municipalities ===
Metropolitan (or category A) municipalities govern large densely urbanised regions that encompass multiple centers with close economic linkages, i.e. metropolises. Metropolitan municipalities are unitary authorities responsible for all local government functions within their areas.

Since the 2011 municipal election there are eight metropolitan municipalities:

- Buffalo City (East London – Mdantsane – Zwelitsha – King William's Town – Bhisho)
- City of Cape Town (Cape Town – Milnerton – Atlantis – Bellville – Mitchells Plain – Khayelitsha – Somerset West – Simon's Town)
- City of Johannesburg (Johannesburg – Soweto – Roodepoort – Lenasia – Randburg – Sandton – Midrand)
- City of Tshwane (Pretoria – Centurion – Soshanguve – Hammanskraal – Mamelodi – Bronkhorstspruit)
- Ekurhuleni (Alberton – Katlehong – Germiston – Kempton Park – Tembisa – Boksburg – Benoni – Brakpan – Springs – Daveyton – Nigel)
- eThekwini (Durban – uMhlanga – KwaMashu – Phoenix – oThongathi – Pinetown – Cato Ridge – Chatsworth – Umlazi – Amanzimtoti – eMkhomazi)
- Mangaung (Bloemfontein – Botshabelo – Thaba 'Nchu)
- Nelson Mandela Bay (Port Elizabeth – iBhayi – Despatch – Uitenhage)

Buffalo City and Mangaung were originally local municipalities (see below) which were separated from their district municipalities and upgraded to metropolitan status in 2011. The other six municipalities were founded as metropolitan municipalities at the inception of the current system of local government in 2000.

=== District and local municipalities ===
The rest of the country, outside the metropolitan areas, is governed jointly by district and local municipalities. Each district (or category C) municipality is divided into a number of local (category B) municipalities. District municipalities have responsibility for broader matters such as integrated planning, infrastructure development, bulk supply of water and electricity, and public transport; while local municipalities have responsibility for all municipal functions not assigned to the district, and in particular local service delivery. As of 2016 there are 44 district municipalities divided into 205 local municipalities.

== Elections ==
Municipalities are governed by municipal councils which are elected every five years. The most recent nationwide municipal election was held on 1 November 2021. The next such election is set to be held on 4 November 2026.

The councils of metropolitan and local municipalities are elected by a system of mixed-member proportional representation. These municipalities are divided into wards, and each ward directly elects one councillor by first-past-the-post voting. An equal number of councillors are appointed from party lists so that the overall makeup of the council is proportional to the votes received by each party.

In district municipalities, 60% of the councillors are appointed by the councils of their constituent local municipalities, while the remaining 40% are elected by party-list proportional representation.

== Legislation ==
The basic structure of local government originates from Chapter 7 of the Constitution of South Africa. In addition to this a number of acts of Parliament regulate the organisation of local government. The principal statutes are:

- Local Government: Municipal Demarcation Act, 1998 (Act 27 of 1998)
- Local Government: Municipal Structures Act, 1998 (Act 117 of 1998)
- Local Government: Municipal Systems Act, 2000 (Act 32 of 2000)
- Local Government: Municipal Finance Management Act, 2003 (Act 56 of 2003)
- Local Government: Municipal Property Rates Act, 2004 (Act 6 of 2004)

== Name changes ==
The South African Geographical Names Council is a statutory body that deals specifically with changing names of places in South Africa, including municipalities.

== Mismanagement, inefficiency and discontent ==
In rural areas South African municipalities are generally in a poor and deteriorating financial state, a situation which affects business activity and risks, livelihoods and growth propects of the economy. Businesses and their insurers have expressed concern that business assets in rural municipalities are not insurable.

Discontent with the service delivery of municipalities is evident from the rising number of protests recorded from 2004 to 2020. The number of major protests increased from only 10 in 2004, to 237 in 2018. By 2019–20 Gauteng province had the most service delivery protests (some 23%), followed by KwaZulu-Natal (c.21%), the Western Cape (c.20%), Eastern Cape (c.15%) and Mpumalanga (c.9%). Discontent often revolves around the demand for housing and free basic services, especially when community members are displaced or suffer the loss of income. Other causes are perceived councillor accountability, the quality or pace of basic service delivery (housing, water and electricity), misappropriation of COVID-19 relief benefits and land invasions. Protestors sometimes confuse issues relating to land demarcation, political candidates, or employer disputes with local government's service delivery mandate. When violent, protests may impinge on freedom of movement or property of others.

Some of South Africa's municipalities are drowning in debt due to corruption and lack of skills, and by 2020 a significant proportion found themselves financially and logistically stressed by the pandemic. Municipalities often employ unqualified personnel who are unable to deliver proper financial and performance governance, which in addition leads to fraud, irregular expenditure (R30 billion in 2017, and R25 billion in 2018) and consequence-free misconduct. Only a fraction (14% in 2017, 8% in 2018) of municipalities submit clean annual audits to the Auditor-General, and implementation of the AG's recommendations has been lax. By 2018, 45% of municipalities have not implemented all procedures for reporting and investigating transgressions or fraud, while 74% were found to insufficiently follow up on such allegations. The late Kimi Makwetu suggested holding employees individually accountable, treating recommendations as binding and issuing a certificate of debt to guilty parties.

In 2022 it was revealed that almost all municipalities have aging and dysfunctional water infrastructure. The Department of Water and Sanitation stated that poor maintenance and operations caused an average 40% (26%-60%) of water to be lost before it reached end users. As of 2020, municipalities owed South Africa's Water Boards a total of R12 billion, and a culture of non-payment had taken hold. They had also accumulated debt of R46.1 billion (R31 billion overdue) with Eskom.

Emfuleni Municipality's unserviced debt with Eskom (over R2.3 billion by 2020) and Rand Water (some R1,1 billion) prevented it from providing a reliable power and water supply, which affected its ability to collect levies and taxes. A 2018 High Court judgment allowed Eskom to seize R645 million worth of Emfuleni's fixed assets due to non-payment for electricity. Lekwa Municipality has been taken to court by businesses around Standerton for failing to provide clean and sufficient water and electricity. These service interruptions were due to its soaring debt to Eskom (R1.1 billion by 2020), and its non-payment for services provided by the Department of Water and Sanitation. In 2018 VBS Bank collapsed, affecting the deposits of 14 municipalities. These deposits, which were all illegal in terms of the Municipal Finance Management Act (MFMA), included a R245 million deposit by Fetakgomo Tubatse Municipality, and a R161 million deposit by Giyani Municipality.

== See also ==
- Municipal Demarcation Board
