= East Driefontein =

- Location within Gauteng Location within South Africa
- Coordinates: 26.389°S 27.499°E
- Country: South Africa
- Province: Gauteng
- District: West Rand
- Municipality: Merafong City

Area
  - Total: 10.33 km^{2} (3.99 sq mi)

Population (2011)
  - Total: 3,876
  - Density: 375.2/km^{2} (971.8/sq mi)

Racial makeup (2011)
  - Black African: 98.7%
  - Coloured: 0.5%
  - Indian/Asian: 0.1%
  - White: 0.6%
  - Other: 0.1%

First languages (2011)
- Time zone: UTC+2 (SAST)
- Postal code (street): 2499
- PO box: 2509

East Driefontein is a small gold mining town approximately 20 km outside Carletonville, Gauteng, South Africa, next to West Driefontein. In 2011, it had a population of 3,876
