= Constitution of South Africa =

Supreme law of South Africa

Constitution of the Republic of South Africa, 1996

Overview
- Jurisdiction: South Africa
- Ratified: 18 December 1996
- Date effective: 4 February 1997
- System: Republic

Government structure
- Branches: Three (executive, legislature and judiciary)
- Chambers: Bicameral (Parliament)
- Executive: President and Cabinet
- Judiciary: Constitutional Court and others
- Author: Constitutional Assembly
- Signatories: President Nelson Mandela
- Supersedes: Constitution of the Republic of South Africa, 1993

Full text
- Constitution of the Republic of South Africa, 1996 at Wikisource

Constitution of South Africa
- Zulu: UMthethosisekelo waseNingizimu Afrika
- Afrikaans: Grondwet van Suid-Afrika
- Swazi: Umtsetfo Sisekelo wase Ningizimu Afrika
- Sesotho: Molaotheo wa Afrika Borwa

The Constitution of South Africa is the supreme law of the Republic of South Africa. It provides the legal foundation for the existence of the republic, it sets out the human rights and duties of its citizens, and defines the structure of the Government. The current constitution, the country's fifth, was drawn up by the Parliament elected in the 1994 general election. It was promulgated by President Nelson Mandela on 18 December 1996 and came into effect on 4 February 1997, replacing the Interim Constitution of 1993. The first constitution was enacted by the South Africa Act 1909, the longest-lasting to date.

Since 1997, the Constitution has been amended by eighteen amendments. The Constitution is formally entitled the "Constitution of the Republic of South Africa, 1996." It was previously also numbered as if it were an Act of Parliament – Act No. 108 of 1996 – but, since the passage of the Citation of Constitutional Laws Act, neither it nor the acts amending it are allocated act numbers.

== History ==
=== Previous Constitutions of South Africa ===
The South Africa Act 1909, an act of the Parliament of the United Kingdom, unified four British colonies – Cape Colony, Transvaal Colony, Orange River Colony and Natal Colony – into the Union of South Africa, a self-governing dominion.

The Republic of South Africa Constitution Act, 1961 replaced the Queen with a State President, but otherwise left the system of government largely unchanged. In a referendum, the first national election with a solely white electorate, the Act was narrowly approved, with a substantial minority in the Cape province and a strong majority in Natal opposing it.

The Republic of South Africa Constitution Act, 1983, again approved by a whites-only referendum, created the Tricameral Parliament, with separate houses representing Whites, Coloureds and Indians but without representation for Blacks. The figurehead State President and executive Prime Minister were merged into an executive State President, chosen by parliament. This characteristic remains to date and is nearly unique to South Africa (one exception being neighbouring Botswana).

The Constitution of the Republic of South Africa, 1993 or Interim Constitution was introduced at the end of apartheid to govern the period of transition. It introduced, for the first time, the framework of a liberal democracy, universal adult suffrage and a bill of rights.

=== Negotiations ===
An integral part of the negotiations to end apartheid in South Africa was the creation of a new constitution. One of the major disputed issues was the process by which such a constitution would be adopted. The African National Congress (ANC) insisted that it should be drawn up by a democratically elected constituent assembly, while the governing National Party (NP) feared that the rights of minorities would not be protected in such a process, and proposed instead that the constitution be negotiated by consensus between the parties and then put to a referendum.

Formal negotiations began in December 1991 at the Convention for a Democratic South Africa (CODESA). The parties agreed on a process whereby a negotiated transitional constitution would provide for an elected constitutional assembly to draw up a permanent constitution. The CODESA negotiations broke down, however, after the second plenary session in May 1992. One of the major points of dispute was the size of the supermajority that would be required for the assembly to adopt the constitution: The NP wanted a 75 per cent requirement, which would effectively have given it a veto.

In April 1993, the parties returned to negotiations, in what was known as the Multi-Party Negotiating Process (MPNP). A committee of the MPNP proposed the development of a collection of "constitutional principles" with which the final constitution would have to comply, so that basic freedoms would be ensured and minority rights protected, without overly limiting the role of the elected constitutional assembly. The parties to the MPNP adopted this idea and proceeded to draft the Interim Constitution of 1993, which was formally enacted by Parliament and came into force on 27 April 1994.

=== Interim Constitution ===
The Interim Constitution provided for a Parliament made up of two houses: a 400-member National Assembly, directly elected by party-list proportional representation, and a ninety-member Senate, in which each of the nine provinces was represented by ten Senators, elected by the provincial legislature. The Constitutional Assembly consisted of both houses sitting together, and was responsible for drawing up a final constitution within two years. The adoption of a new constitutional text required a two-thirds supermajority in the Constitutional Assembly, as well as the support of two-thirds of senators on matters relating to provincial government. If a two-thirds majority could not be obtained, a constitutional text could be adopted by a simple majority and then put to a national referendum in which sixty per cent support would be required for it to pass.

The Interim Constitution contained 34 constitutional principles with which the new constitution was required to comply. These included multi-party democracy with regular elections and universal adult suffrage, supremacy of the constitution over all other law, a quasi-federal system in place of centralised government, non-racism and non-sexism, the protection of "all universally accepted fundamental rights, freedoms and civil liberties," equality before the law, the separation of powers with an impartial judiciary, provincial and local levels of government with democratic representation, and protection of the diversity of languages and cultures. The Bill of Rights, now in Chapter Two of the Constitution of South Africa, was largely written by Kader Asmal and Albie Sachs. The new constitutional text was to be tested against these principles by the newly established Constitutional Court. If the text complied with the principles, it would become the new constitution; if it did not, it would be referred back to the Constitutional Assembly.

=== Final text ===
The Constitutional Assembly engaged in a massive public participation programme to solicit views and suggestions from the public. As the deadline for the adoption of a constitutional text approached, however, many issues were hashed out in private meetings between the parties' representatives. On 8 May 1996, a new text was adopted with the support of 86 per cent of the members of the assembly, but in the First Certification judgment, delivered on 6 September 1996, the Constitutional Court refused to certify this text. The Constitutional Court identified a number of provisions that did not comply with the constitutional principles. Areas of non-compliance included failures to protect the right of employees to engage in collective bargaining; to provide for the constitutional review of ordinary statutes; to entrench fundamental rights, freedoms and civil liberties and to sufficiently safeguard the independence of the Public Protector and Auditor-General as well as other areas of non-compliance in relation to local government responsibilities and powers.

The Constitutional Assembly reconvened and, on 11 October, adopted an amended constitutional text containing many changes relative to the previous text. Some dealt with the court's reasons for non-certification, while others tightened up the text. The amended text was returned to the Constitutional Court to be certified, which the court duly did in its Second Certification judgment, delivered on 4 December. The Constitution was signed by President Mandela on 10 December and officially published in the Government Gazette on 18 December. It did not come into force immediately; it was brought into operation on 4 February 1997, by a presidential proclamation, except for some financial provisions which were delayed until 1 January 1998.

== Contents ==
The constitution consists of a preamble, fourteen chapters containing 244 sections, and eight schedules. Each chapter deals with a particular topic; the schedules contain ancillary information referred to in the main text.

=== Preamble ===
The preamble constitution is as follows:

We, the people of South Africa,

Recognise the injustices of our past;

Honour those who suffered for justice and freedom in our land;

Respect those who have worked to build and develop our country; and

Believe that South Africa belongs to all who live in it, united in our diversity.

We therefore, through our freely elected representatives, adopt this Constitution as the supreme law of the Republic so as to

- Heal the divisions of the past and establish a society based on democratic values, social justice and fundamental human rights;
- Lay the foundations for a democratic and open society in which government is based on the will of the people and every citizen is equally protected by law;
- Improve the quality of life of all citizens and free the potential of each person; and
- Build a united and democratic South Africa able to take its rightful place as a sovereign state in the family of nations.

May God protect our people.

Nkosi Sikelel’ iAfrika. Morena boloka setjhabasa heso.

God seën Suid-Afrika. God bless South Africa.

Mudzimu fhatutshedza Afurika. Hosi katekisa Afrika.

=== Chapter 1: Founding Provisions ===
Chapter 1 enshrines in the constitution key national principles, defines the country's flag and national anthem, and specifies the official languages and principles of government language policy. It defines South Africa as "one, sovereign, democratic state" based on principles of human rights, constitutional supremacy, the rule of law and universal adult suffrage. The chapter contains a supremacy clause which establishes that all other law and actions are subject to the constitution.

=== Chapter 2: Bill of Rights ===
Chapter 2 is a bill of rights which enumerates the civil, political, economic, social and cultural human rights of the people of South Africa. Most of these rights apply to anyone in the country, with the exception of the right to vote, the right to work and the right to enter the country, which apply only to citizens. They also apply to juristic persons to the extent that they are applicable, taking into account the nature of the right. The rights enumerated are:

- Section 9: everyone is equal before the law and has right to equal protection and the benefit of the law. Prohibited grounds of discrimination include race, gender, sex, pregnancy, marital status, ethnic or social origin, colour, sexual orientation, age, disability, religion, conscience, belief, culture, language and birth.
- Section 10: the right to human dignity.
- Section 11: the right to life
- Section 12: the right to freedom and security of the person, including protection against arbitrary detention and detention without trial, the right to be protected against violence, freedom from torture, freedom from cruel, inhuman or degrading treatment, the right to bodily integrity, and reproductive rights.
- Section 13: freedom from slavery, servitude or forced labour.
- Section 14: the right to privacy, including protection against search and seizure, and the privacy of correspondence.
- Section 15: freedom of thought and freedom of religion.
- Section 16: freedom of speech and expression, including freedom of the press and academic freedom. Explicitly excluded are propaganda for war, incitement to violence and advocacy of hatred based on race, ethnicity, gender or religion.
- Section 17: freedom of assembly and the right to protest.
- Section 18: freedom of association.
- Section 19: the right to vote and universal adult suffrage; the right to stand for public office; the right to free, fair and regular elections; and the right to form, join and campaign for a political party.
- Section 20: no citizen may be deprived of citizenship.
- Section 21: freedom of movement, including the right to leave South Africa, the right of citizens to a passport and the right to enter South Africa.
- Section 22: the right to choose a trade, occupation or profession, although these may be regulated by law.
- Section 23: labour rights, including the right to unionise and the right to strike.
- Section 24: the right to a healthy environment protected.
- Section 25: the right to property, limited in that property may only be expropriated under a law of general application (not arbitrarily), for a public purpose and with the payment of compensation.
- Section 26: the right to housing, including the right to due process with regard to court-ordered eviction and demolition.
- Section 27: the rights to food, water, health care and social assistance, which the state must progressively realise within the limits of its resources.
- Section 28: children's rights, including the right to a name and nationality, the right to family or parental care, the right to a basic standard of living, the right to be protected from maltreatment and abuse, the protection from inappropriate child labour, the right not to be detained except as a last resort, the paramountcy of the best interests of the child and the right to an independent lawyer in court cases involving the child, and the prohibition of the military use of children.
- Section 29: the right to education, including a universal right to basic education.
- Section 30: the right to use the language of one's choice and to participate in the cultural life of one's choice.
- Section 31: the right of cultural, religious or linguistic communities to enjoy their culture, practise their religion and use their language.
- Section 32: the right of access to information, including all information held by the government.
- Section 33: the right to justice in administrative action by the government.
- Section 34: the right of access to the courts.
- Section 35: the rights of arrested, detained and accused people, including the right to silence, protection against self-incrimination, the right to counsel and legal aid, the right to a fair trial, the presumption of innocence and the prohibition of double jeopardy and ex post facto crimes.

Section 36 allows the rights listed to be limited only by laws of general application, and only to the extent that the restriction is reasonable and justifiable in "an open and democratic society based on human dignity, equality and freedom."

Section 37 allows certain rights to be limited during a state of emergency but places strict procedural limits on the declaration of states of emergency and provides for the rights of people detained as a result.

=== Chapter 3: Co-operative Government ===
Chapter 3 deals with the relationships between organs of government in the three "spheres" – national, provincial and local. It lays down a set of principles requiring them to co-operate in good faith and to act in the best interests of the people. It also requires them to attempt to settle disputes amicably before resorting to the courts.

=== Chapter 4: Parliament ===
Chapter 4 defines the structure of Parliament, the legislative branch of the national government. Parliament consists of two houses, the National Assembly (the lower house), which is directly elected by the people, and the National Council of Provinces (the upper house), which is elected by the provincial legislatures.

The Chapter defines the principles governing the election and dissolution of the houses, qualifications for membership of Parliament, quorum requirements, procedures for the election of presiding officers, and the powers and privileges and immunities of Parliament and its members. It lays down the process for enacting bills into law; different procedures are provided for constitutional amendments, ordinary bills not affecting provincial matters, ordinary bills affecting provincial matters, and money bills.

=== Chapter 5: The President and National Executive ===
Chapter 5 defines the structure of the national executive and the powers of the President. It provides for the election and removal of the President by the National Assembly, and limits a President to two five-year terms. It vests the president the powers of the head of state and head of government; it provides for the appointment of a Cabinet by the President; and it provides for the accountability to Parliament of the President and Cabinet.

=== Chapter 6: Provinces ===
Chapter 6 establishes the nine provinces of South Africa and defines the powers and structure of the provincial governments. The boundaries of the provinces are defined by reference to Schedule 1A to the Constitution, which refers in turn to the boundaries of the metropolitan and district municipalities.

In some respects, the chapter is a template which a province may modify to a limited extent by adopting its own provincial constitution. (The only province so far to have done this is the Western Cape.) The chapter provides for a unicameral legislature, a Premier elected by the legislature as head of the provincial executive, and an Executive Council appointed by the Premier as a provincial cabinet.

The provincial government is given exclusive powers over certain matters, listed in Schedule 5, and powers concurrent with the national government over other matters, listed in Schedule 4. The chapter regulates the conflict between national and provincial legislation on the same topic, setting out the circumstances under which one or the other will prevail.

=== Chapter 7: Local Government ===
Chapter 7 sets out a framework for local government. It requires municipalities to be established for the whole territory of South Africa, and provides for three categories of municipalities, whereby some areas are governed by a single "Category A" municipal authority and others are governed by a two-level system with a larger "Category C" municipality containing multiple "Category B" municipalities. The municipalities are granted the power to administer certain matters listed in Schedules 4 and 5, and the executive and legislative authority is vested in the municipal council. The chapter requires municipal elections to be held every five years.

=== Chapter 8: Courts and Administration of Justice ===
Chapter 8 establishes the structure of the judicial system. It defines the hierarchy consisting of Magistrates' Courts, the High Court, the Supreme Court of Appeal, and the Constitutional Court. It provides for the appointment of judges by the President on the advice of the Judicial Service Commission and establishes a single National Prosecuting Authority responsible for all criminal prosecutions.

=== Chapter 9: State Institutions Supporting Constitutional Democracy ===
Chapter 9 creates a number of other commissions and offices to protect and support democracy and human rights. These are the Public Protector (an ombudsman), the South African Human Rights Commission, the Commission for the Promotion and Protection of the Rights of Cultural, Religious and Linguistic Communities, the Commission for Gender Equality, the Auditor-General, the Independent Electoral Commission and the Independent Communications Authority.

=== Chapter 10: Public Administration ===
Chapter 10 lists values and principles for the administration of the civil service and establishes the Public Service Commission to oversee it.

=== Chapter 11: Security Services ===
Chapter 11 establishes structures for civilian control of the Defence Force, the Police Service and the intelligence services. It makes the President the Commander-in-Chief of the defence force but places conditions on when and how it may be employed and requires regular reports to Parliament. The police service is placed under the control of the national government but gives provincial governments some power to administer and oversee policing.

=== Chapter 12: Traditional Leaders ===
Chapter 12 recognizes the status and authority of traditional leaders and customary law, subject to the Constitution. It allows for the creation of provincial houses of traditional leaders and a national council of traditional leaders.

The Traditional leaders must have responsibilities in affairs and decision making of the municipality in order to build proper sustainable development to the people that resides on that municipality. Because we have Traditional leaders that do not have daily duties day in and day out; in short they must be part of mayoral council.

=== Chapter 13: Finance ===
Chapter 13 deals with public finance. It establishes a National Revenue Fund, from which money may be appropriated only by an act of Parliament, and Provincial Revenue Funds, from which money may only be appropriated by an act of the provincial legislature. It provides for an equitable distribution of national revenue to the provinces and municipalities, and grants provincial and local governments the powers to raise certain rates and taxes. It requires effective and transparent budgeting at all levels of government and gives the National Treasury the power to oversee budgetary processes. It places some restrictions on government procurement and government borrowing. The chapter establishes the Financial and Fiscal Commission, to advise government on financial matters, and the Reserve Bank, to oversee the currency.

Economist Jacques Jonker has criticised the provisions of Chapter 13 as being insufficient to guard against fiscal imprudence, and has suggested that it be amended in line with other constitutions such as that of Spain in order to enforce fiscal discipline.

=== Chapter 14: General Provisions ===
The final chapter deals with transitional and incidental provisions. In particular, the first part deals with international law, providing that existing agreements binding South Africa will continue to bind it, and that new agreements (except those of a technical nature) will only be binding once approved by Parliament. It also provides that customary international law applies in South Africa unless it conflicts with national law, and that the courts must, where possible, interpret national law to be consistent with international law.

The remainder of the chapter contains a miscellaneous collection of provisions,

- allowing Parliament to enact Charters of Rights which expand on the Bill of Rights;
- allowing recognition of the right of self-determination of communities within South Africa;
- requiring public funding for political parties represented in national and provincial legislatures;
- requiring that obligations imposed by the constitution be carried out without delay;
- providing that some executive powers may be delegated by one organ of state to another;
- defining certain terms used in the text of the constitution; and,
- as the Constitution is published in all eleven official languages, providing that the English text is authoritative in the event of a conflict.

Chapter 14 also repeals the Interim Constitution and refers to Schedule 6 to govern the process of transition to the new Constitution. Finally, it gives the Constitution its formal title, "Constitution of the Republic of South Africa, 1996," and defines the schedule for its commencement, under which the President set the date of commencement for most sections, although certain sections dealing with financial matters commenced only on 1 January 1998.

=== Schedules ===
- Schedule 1, referred to in Chapter 1, describes the national flag.
- Schedule 1A, referred to in Chapter 6, defines the geographical areas of the provinces, by reference to maps published by the Municipal Demarcation Board defining the metropolitan and district municipalities.
- Schedule 2 contains the texts of the oaths or solemn affirmations to be sworn by political office-holders and judges.
- Schedule 3 describes the procedure for the election of the President by the National Assembly and the election of presiding officers by legislative bodies, as well as the formula whereby seats in the National Council of Provinces are to be allocated to political parties.
- Schedule 4 lists the "functional areas" over which Parliament and the provincial legislatures have concurrent competence to legislate.
- Schedule 5 lists the functional areas over which the provincial legislatures have exclusive competence to legislate.
- Schedule 6 details the transitional arrangements by which institutions existing under the previous constitution were converted into the institutions established by the new constitution. It provides for the continuation of existing laws and the assignment of their administration to the provincial governments where appropriate. It also provides for certain sections of the old constitution to continue in force despite its repeal, and subject to amendments listed in the schedule. It also includes temporary amendments to the Constitution's own text which allowed the Government of National Unity to continue until the 1999 election.
- Schedule 7 lists the laws repealed by the new constitution, these being the interim constitution and the ten amendments made to it.

== Amendments ==
Section 74 of the Constitution provides that a bill to amend the Constitution can only be passed if at least two-thirds of the members of the National Assembly (that is, at least 267 of the 400 members) vote in favour of it. If the amendment affects provincial powers or boundaries, or if it amends the Bill of Rights, at least six of the nine provinces in the National Council of Provinces must also vote for it. To amend section 1 of the Constitution, which establishes the existence of South Africa as a sovereign, democratic state, and lays out the country's founding values, would require the support of three-quarters of the members of the National Assembly. There have been eighteen amendments since 1996.

=== First Amendment ===
The Constitution First Amendment Act (formerly the Constitution of the Republic of South Africa Amendment Act, 1997) was signed by the President on 28 August 1997 but had effect retroactively to 4 February 1997 when the constitution came into force. It had three provisions:

- to provide that a person who serves as Acting President of the Republic more than once during a single presidential term only has to swear the oath of office the first time that they become Acting President.
- to allow the President of the Constitutional Court to designate another judge to administer the oath of office to the President or Acting President, rather than administering it personally.
- to extend the cut-off date for actions for which amnesty could be granted by the Truth and Reconciliation Commission, changing it from 6 December 1993 to 11 May 1994.

This last change allowed the TRC to deal with various violent events, particularly the Bophuthatswana coup d'état and its aftermath, that had occurred in the run-up to the 1994 general elections.

=== Second Amendment ===
The Constitution Second Amendment Act (formerly the Constitution of the Republic of South Africa Amendment Act, 1998) came into force on 7 October 1998. It had five provisions:

- to extend the term of office of municipal councils from four years to five years.
- to extend certain deadlines in the process of transition to the post-apartheid system of local government.
- to allow for the designation of alternates to replace members of the Judicial Service Commission.
- to give Parliament the ability to assign additional powers or functions to the Public Service Commission.
- to rename the Human Rights Commission to the South African Human Rights Commission.

=== Third Amendment ===
The Constitution Third Amendment Act (formerly the Constitution of the Republic of South Africa Second Amendment Act, 1998) came into force on 30 October 1998. It allowed for municipalities to be established across provincial boundaries by the agreement of the national and the relevant provincial governments. The changes it made were reversed in 2005 by the Twelfth Amendment.

=== Fourth and Fifth Amendments ===
The Constitution Fourth Amendment Act and Constitution Fifth Amendment Act (formerly the Constitution of the Republic of South Africa Amendment Act, 1999 and Constitution of the Republic of South Africa Second Amendment Act, 1999) came into force on 19 March 1999. They were passed as two separate amendments because the Fourth contained provisions affecting provincial government, which required the approval of the National Council of Provinces, while the Fifth did not.

The Fourth Amendment:

- clarified that elections to the provincial legislatures may be called either before or after the term of office of the previous legislature has expired.
- modified the formula for the allocation of delegates' seats to parties in the National Council of Provinces.

The Fifth Amendment:

- clarified that elections to the National Assembly may be called either before or after the term of office of the previous Assembly has expired.
- allowed the chairperson and deputy chairperson of the Financial and Fiscal Commission to be part-time members.

=== Sixth Amendment ===
The Constitution Sixth Amendment Act (formerly the Constitution of the Republic of South Africa Amendment Act, 2001) came into force on 21 November 2001. Its main effect was to give the title of "Chief Justice of South Africa" to the presiding judge of the Constitutional Court of South Africa, who had previously been titled "President of the Constitutional Court". The presiding judge of the Supreme Court of Appeal (SCA), who had previously had the title of Chief Justice, became instead "President of the Supreme Court of Appeal". The deputy heads of each court were also renamed similarly. Consequentially many provisions of the Constitution had to be amended where they made reference to the President of the Constitutional Court.

These changes were intended to clarify the structure of the South African judiciary. Previously, the President of the Constitutional Court was responsible for various constitutional responsibilities, such as calling the first session of Parliament after an election and presiding over the election of the President of the Republic at that session, while the Chief Justice was responsible for judicial administration, including for example chairing the Judicial Service Commission. These responsibilities were merged into a single post, reflecting the pre-eminence of the Constitutional Court at the apex of the court system.

Other provisions of the amendment:

- allowed the term of office of a Constitutional Court judge – usually twelve years or until the judge reaches the age of seventy, whichever is shorter – to be extended by an Act of Parliament.
- allowed the President to appoint two Deputy Ministers from outside the National Assembly, where previously Deputy Ministers had to be members of the Assembly.
- allowed municipal councils to bind the authority of future successor councils, as security for a loan.

=== Seventh Amendment ===
The Constitution Seventh Amendment Act (formerly the Constitution of the Republic of South Africa Second Amendment Act, 2001) came into force on 26 April 2002, except for provisions affecting the Financial and Fiscal Commission which came into force on 1 December 2003. It made various amendments to provisions affecting the financial management of national and provincial government, including:

- an extension of what is considered a "money bill" in the national Parliament and the provincial legislatures.
- requiring that Division of Revenue Bills (bills dividing revenue between national, provincial and local government) can only be introduced to Parliament by the Minister of Finance.
- reducing the size of the Financial and Fiscal Commission from 22 members to nine members, by reducing the number of members chosen by the president from nine to two, and by replacing the nine members chosen by the nine provinces individually with three members chosen by the provinces collectively.
- modifying the mechanisms whereby the national government can control the financial practices of the provincial governments.

=== Eighth, Ninth and Tenth Amendments ===
These amendments allowed legislators to cross the floor, that is, to resign from their political party and join a different party (or form a new party) without losing their elected position. This was not originally allowed because South African elections are based on party-list proportional representation in which voters choose a political party rather than an individual candidate. Floor crossing therefore means that the composition of the elected bodies no longer represents the preferences of voters.

The Eighth and Ninth Amendments came into force on 20 June 2002, as did an ordinary act of Parliament called the Loss or Retention of Membership of National and Provincial Legislatures Act, 2002. The Eighth Amendment allowed members of municipal councils to cross the floor. The Loss or Retention of Membership Act was intended to allow members of the National Assembly and provincial legislatures to cross the floor. The Ninth Amendment made provision for the reallocation of seats in the National Council of Provinces when the party composition of a provincial legislature changed as a result of floor crossing.

However, on 4 October 2002, in the case of United Democratic Movement v President of the Republic of South Africa and Others, the Constitutional Court found the Loss or Retention of Membership Act to be unconstitutional, so floor crossing remained prohibited in the National Assembly and provincial legislatures. The Tenth Amendment was introduced to constitutionally allow floor crossing in the National Assembly and provincial legislatures; it came into force on 20 March 2003.

The changes made by these three amendments were reversed when floor crossing was ended in 2009 by the Fourteenth and Fifteenth Amendments.

=== Eleventh Amendment ===
The Constitution Eleventh Amendment Act (formerly the Constitution of the Republic of South Africa Second Amendment Act, 2003) came into force on 11 July 2003. It renamed the Northern Province to Limpopo, altered the procedure for intervention by the national government in a failing provincial government and intervention by a provincial government in a failing municipality, and expanded the powers of the provincial executive when it intervenes in a municipality.

=== Twelfth and Thirteenth Amendments ===
Areas and boundaries affected by the Twelfth Amendment

The Constitution Twelfth Amendment Act came into force on 1 March 2006; it altered the boundaries of seven of the provinces. In the interim constitution the provinces had been defined in terms of magisterial districts; the amendment redefined them in terms of the district and metropolitan municipalities. The Twelfth Amendment also removed the provisions introduced by the Third Amendment that allowed municipalities to be established across provincial boundaries.

Some of the boundary changes encountered substantial public opposition. The community of Matatiele, which had been transferred from KwaZulu-Natal to the Eastern Cape, challenged the amendment before the Constitutional Court, which ruled on 18 August 2006 that the KwaZulu-Natal Legislature had not allowed for the necessary public participation before approving the amendment. The court's order was suspended for eighteen months, and during that time Parliament re-enacted the Matatiele boundary change as the Thirteenth Amendment, which came into force on 14 December 2007.

The people of Khutsong, which had been transferred from Gauteng to the North West, resorted to marches, protests (in some cases violent) and boycotts and stayaways. In 2009 the Merafong City Municipality, which contains Khutsong, was transferred back to Gauteng by the Sixteenth Amendment.

=== Fourteenth and Fifteenth Amendments ===
The Constitution Fourteenth and Fifteenth Amendment Acts came into force on 17 April 2009; they repealed the floor crossing provisions introduced by the Eighth, Ninth, and Tenth Amendments.

The Fourteenth Amendment contained the provisions which affected the provincial legislatures and the National Council of Provinces (NCOP), and therefore had to be approved by supermajority in the NCOP as well as the National Assembly, while the Fifteenth Amendment contained the remaining provisions which only had to be approved by the Assembly.

=== Sixteenth Amendment ===
The Constitution Sixteenth Amendment Act came into force on 3 April 2009. It transferred the Merafong City Municipality from the North West province to Gauteng province. This followed community opposition and protest in Khutsong following from the boundary change introduced by the Twelfth Amendment.

=== Seventeenth Amendment ===
The Constitution Seventeenth Amendment Act came into force on 23 August 2013; along with the Superior Courts Act it restructured the judicial system. The amendment:

- declared the Chief Justice to be the head of the judiciary, with responsibility for administrative oversight of the courts.
- expanded the jurisdiction of the Constitutional Court so that, as well as constitutional matters, it has jurisdiction over any matters of general public importance that it chooses to hear.
- removed the jurisdiction of the Supreme Court of Appeal over appeals from the Labour Appeal Court and the Competition Appeal Court.
- altered references to the High Courts so that they are regarded as divisions of a single High Court of South Africa rather than separate courts.
- allowed the appointment of a Constitutional Court judge as acting Deputy Chief Justice (DCJ) if the position is vacant or the DCJ is absent.

=== Eighteenth Amendment ===
The Constitution Eighteenth Amendment Act, signed on 19 July 2023, made South African Sign Language an official language of South Africa, in addition to the existing eleven official spoken languages. It came into force on 26 June 2026 when a presidential proclamation to that effect was published in the Government Gazette.

== See also ==
- Law of South Africa
- Constitutional law
- Constitutional economics
- Constitutionalism
