= Ward (South Africa) =

Electoral municipality subdivision

Map of the wards into which South Africa is divided

In South Africa, wards are geopolitical subdivisions of municipalities used for electoral purposes. Each metropolitan and local municipality is delimited by the Municipal Demarcation Board into half as many wards as there are seats on the municipal council (rounding up if there are an odd number of seats).

Each ward then elects one councillor directly, and the remaining councillors are elected from party lists so that the overall party representation is proportional to the proportion of votes received by each party.

Prior to the 2026 municipal elections, there were a total of 4,488 wards in South Africa – an increase of 20 over the previous local government election, held in 2021.
