= M86 (Johannesburg) =

Metropolitan route in the Greater Johannesburg, South Africa

Metropolitan route M86

Route information
- Maintained by Johannesburg Roads Agency and Gauteng Department of Roads and Transport
- Length: 28.5 km (17.7 mi)

Major junctions
- West end: R24 at Krugersdorp
- R563 in Krugersdorp; R28 in Krugersdorp M67 in Roodepoort; R564 in Roodepoort M47 in Roodepoort M69 in Roodepoort
- East end: M5 at Randpark Ridge

Location
- Country: South Africa

Highway system
- Numbered routes of South Africa
← M85	→ M88

The M86 is a short metropolitan route in the Greater Johannesburg, South Africa. It connects Krugersdorp with Randpark Ridge via Roodepoort.

There is also a short 5 km road in Kempton Park which is designated as the M86.

== Route ==
The M86 begins at a junction with the R24 road (Rustenburg Road) in the Oatlands suburb of Krugersdorp (west of the town centre). It begins by going northwards as Robert Broom Drive, bypassing the Krugersdorp Airfield and Krugersdorp Game Reserve, to turn eastwards and pass through the Munsieville suburb and meet the R563 road (Hekpoort Road). It continues eastwards, through the Dan Pienaarville and Rant-en-Dal areas, meeting the R28 road (Paardekraal Drive) and passing the Noordheuwel suburb in an east-south-easterly direction, bypassing the Walter Sisulu National Botanical Garden and crossing the Crocodile River, to exit Krugersdorp (Mogale City Local Municipality) and enter Roodepoort in the City of Johannesburg Metropolitan Municipality.

In Roodepoort, it continues east-south-east, becoming Wilgerood Road, to meet the M67 road (CR Swart Drive) in the Wilropark suburb. It continues east-south-east to reach a t-junction with the R564 road (Christaan De Wet Road) in the Kloofendal suburb. It joins the R564 south-east up to the next junction, where it becomes Jim Fouche Road north-eastwards. It heads through the Constantia Kloof suburb to meet the M47 road (Hendrik Potgieter Road) and enter the Weltevredenpark suburb, where it meets the M69 road (JG Strydom Road). It continues north-eastwards to leave Roodepoort and enter the Randpark Ridge suburb of Randburg, where it ends at a junction with the M5 road (Beyers Naudé Drive).

== M86 (Kempton Park) ==
There is a short 5 km road in Kempton Park which is designated as the M86. It starts at a junction with the M90 road (CR Swart Drive) and heads northwards as Duvenhage Avenue, through the eastern part of the Edleen suburb, to meet the northern terminus of the M92 road (Green Avenue) at a roundabout known as the Edleen Circle. It continues north to cross into the Van Riebeeck Park suburb, where it changes its street name to De Wiekus Road. It meets the western terminus of the M89 road (Elgin Road) before meeting the R25 road (Modderfontein Road) and entering the Birch Acres suburb. It heads northwards, becoming Kwartel Road, to reach its end at a junction with the M88 road (Pongolarivier Drive).
