= M18 (Johannesburg) =

Metropolitan route in Greater Johannesburg, South Africa

Metropolitan route M18

Route information
- Maintained by Johannesburg Roads Agency and Gauteng Department of Roads and Transport
- Length: 39.4 km (24.5 mi)

Major junctions
- West end: R28 at Noordheuwel
- M36 at Factoria M67 at Princess; R564 at Constantia Kloof M69 at Constantia Kloof; M8 at Florida Park M47 at Maraisburg; M30 at Delarey; M10 at Westbury; M5 at Auckland Park; M17 at Auckland Park; M7 at Cottesloe; M27 at Braamfontein; M9 at Braamfontein; M11 at Hillbrow; M31 at Hillbrow; M10 at Observatory M33 at Cyrildene
- East end: R24 at Bruma

Location
- Country: South Africa

Highway system
- Numbered routes of South Africa
← M17	→ M19

The M18 is a long metropolitan route in Greater Johannesburg, South Africa. It connects Krugersdorp with Bruma via Constantia Kloof, Florida, Auckland Park, Braamfontein and Observatory.

It is an alternative route to the R24 route for travel between Krugersdorp and Bruma.

== Route ==
The M18 begins at a junction with the R28 road (Paardekraal Drive) in the Noordheuwel suburb of Krugersdorp (just north of the Krugersdorp CBD) in the Mogale City Local Municipality, heading east-south-east as Voortrekker Road. It bypasses the Coronation Park, meets the M36 road and enters the Silverfields suburb, where it becomes parallel to the R24 road (Albertina Sisulu Road) eastwards for a few kilometres. Just after, at the suburb of Mindalore, the M18 changes its street name to Ontdekkers Road and leaves the Mogale City Local Municipality to enter Roodepoort in the City of Johannesburg Metropolitan Municipality.

It enters the Princess suburb of Roodepoort, where it meets the M67 road and bypasses the Westgate Shopping Centre. It continues east-south-east, through Horizon Park and Ontdekkers Park, to reach a junction with the R564 road (Christiaan De Wet Avenue) west of Constantia Kloof. It continues east-south-east, through Florida Park (where it meets the M69 road), Floracliffe (where it meets the M8 road), Florida Hills and Florida Central, to meet the south-eastern terminus of the M47 road (Hendrik Potgieter Road) just north of the Maraisburg suburb. Immediately after, it flies over the N1 highway (Johannesburg Western Bypass) and leaves the city of Roodepoort to enter the city of Johannesburg.

It heads eastwards as Main Road, passing through the Delarey and Newlands suburbs (meeting the M30 road), becoming Perth Road and turning east-south-east, to meet the M10 road at a junction. Here, they switch roads, with the M10 becoming the east-south-easterly road and the M18 becoming the east-north-easterly road (still named Perth Road). It becomes Kingsway Avenue eastwards, bypassing the University of Johannesburg Kingsway Campus and meeting the M5 road (Beyers Naudé Drive), to meet the M17 road (Henley Drive).

Just after meeting the M17, the M18 turns south-eastwards as Annet Road to reach a junction with the M7 road (Barry Hertzog Avenue). The M18 joins the M7 and they are one road southwards as Annet Road, then as Solomon Street, before the M18 becomes Enoch Sontonga Avenue eastwards and flies over the M1 highway, bypassing the University of the Witwatersrand to the south.

It continues eastwards as two one-way-streets (Jorissen Street eastwards and De Korte Street westwards), meeting the M27 road (Jan Smuts Avenue) north of the Nelson Mandela Bridge in Braamfontein, to meet the M9 road (Civic Boulevard) adjacent to the Joburg Theatre and the Johannesburg City Council. The M18 joins the M9, passing around the City Council offices, to reach the eastern side of the City Council, where the M9 becomes Joubert Street northwards and the M18 becomes Kotze Road eastwards. It enters the suburb of Hillbrow, where it becomes two one-way-streets (Pretoria Street eastwards and Kotze Street westwards) and meets the M11 road (Klein Street).

At the junction with Catherine Avenue, the M18 becomes one street eastwards (Abel Road). It proceeds to reach a junction with the M31 road (Joe Slovo Drive). The M18 joins the M31 and they are one road northwards for 750 metres up to the junction with Raleigh Street, where the M18 becomes Raleigh Street eastwards and separates the Yeoville suburb from the Bellevue suburb. It becomes two one-way-streets (Hunter Street westwards and Rockey Street eastwards) for a few metres before becoming Observatory Avenue eastwards, passing through the Observatory suburb and bypassing the Observatory Golf Course and the Bezidenhout Park.

It meets the M10 road again and proceeds eastwards as Marcia Street and reaches a junction with the M33 road (Friedland Avenue; Queen Street) in the Cyrildene suburb. After a few metres eastwards, it turns towards the south-south-east and crosses the Jukskei River, bypasses the Bruma Lake Market and reaches its end at a junction with the R24 road (Albertina Sisulu Road) in the suburb of Bruma, just west of the Eastgate Shopping Centre and just north-east of Kensington.
