= M47 (Johannesburg) =

Metropolitan route in the City of Johannesburg, South Africa

Metropolitan route M47

Route information
- Maintained by Johannesburg Roads Agency and Gauteng Department of Roads and Transport

Major junctions
- North-west end: R28 / N14 near Muldersdrift
- M67 at Ruimsig; R564 at Strubens Valley M86 at Allen's Nek M69 at Constantia Kloof; M8 at Floracliffe
- South-east end: M18 near Maraisburg

Location
- Country: South Africa

Highway system
- Numbered routes of South Africa
← M46	→ M48

The M47 is a short metropolitan route in Roodepoort, South Africa. It connects the N14 at Cradlestone Mall with the M18 at Maraisburg in Roodepoort. It consists of only one street, named Hendrik Potgieter Road.

== Route ==
The M47 begins at a 4-way-junction with the N14 national route and the R28 road north-east of Krugersdorp in the Mogale City Local Municipality, adjacent to Cradlestone Mall (south-west of Muldersdrift). It begins by going south-eastwards as Hendrick Potgieter Road to enter the city of Roodepoort in the City of Johannesburg Metropolitan Municipality.

The first suburb it passes through is Ruimsig, where it meets the M67 road (Peter Road; Doreen Road). It continues south-east, through the Little Falls suburb, to form an interchange with the R564 road (Christian de Wet Road) adjacent to Clearwater Mall in Strubens Valley. It meets the M86 road (Jim Fouche Road) at the next junction, before meeting the M69 road west of Constantia Kloof.

It continues south-east to meet the M8 road (14th Avenue) adjacent to the new location of the Roodepoort CBD near the Floracliffe suburb. Here, the M47 becomes parallel with the N1 highway (Johannesburg Western Bypass) south-eastwards, bypassing the Florida Hills suburb and passing the western end of the Florida Glen suburb, to end at a T-junction with the M18 road (Ontdekkers Road) just north of the Maraisburg suburb.
