= Struben =

Struben is a surname, likely of German origin. Notable people with the surname include:

- Edith Frances Mary Struben (1868–1936), South African botanical illustrator and painter
- Harry Struben (1840–1915), Dutch miner

== See also ==
- Somerset de Chair (1911–1995), full name Somerset Struben de Chair, English author, politician, and poet
- Struben Dam Bird Sanctuary, a dam and nature preserve in Gauteng, South Africa
