= Randpark Ridge =

Randpark Ridge Randparkrif
- Location within Gauteng Location within South Africa
- Coordinates: 26.101°S 27.957°E
- Country: South Africa
- Province: Gauteng
- Municipality: City of Johannesburg
- Main Place: Randburg

Government
  - Councillor: David Brand

Area
  - Total: 9.00 km^{2} (3.47 sq mi)
- Elevation: 1,700 m (5,600 ft)

Population (2011)
  - Total: 18,033
  - Density: 2,000/km^{2} (5,190/sq mi)

Racial makeup (2011)
  - Black African: 23.8%
  - Coloured: 3.2%
  - Indian/Asian: 7.6%
  - White: 64.1%
  - Other: 1.4%

First languages (2011)
  - English: 67.4%
  - Afrikaans: 14.5%
  - Zulu: 4.3%
  - Tswana: 2.3%
  - Other: 11.4%
- Time zone: UTC+2 (SAST)
- Postal code (street): 2169
- PO box: 2156

Randpark Ridge is an upmarket suburb of Randburg, South Africa. It is located in Region B of the City of Johannesburg. It fell into the town of Randburg during the apartheid era. Developed in the early 1980s and still relatively new, Randpark Ridge is bordered by several other suburbs including Weltevreden Park, Sundowner, Boskruin, Bromhof, Honeydew and Fairland.

== History ==
The suburb has its origins as part of an old Witwatersrand farm called Boschkop, named after the distinctive hill to north of the suburb, which is now the Boschkop Nature Reserve in the suburb of Boskruin. On this land, an old brick farm house was supposedly built on the land in around 1860. In 1903 the farm was owned by a J. Labuschagne and he sold part of the original land and farm house to John Dale Lace. He added on to the original Boer farmhouse; two gabled sections to either side, and a dam, built over the spruit (stream) that is a tributary of the Klein Jukskei River. At this stage the house had a total of 25 rooms. He would lose his 1300-acre country estate to Standard Bank, who sold it to an Irishman, Tom Kelly, in 1927. Kelly then renovated and extended the old farmhouse, changing its name to Hy Many. A tree lined drive connected the farmhouse to the old Muldersdrift Road, now called Beyers Naude Drive. Kelly's daughter would sell the land in 1982 to the Gencor Trust and the land was rezoned for residential development. Attempts were made to keep the house and have it listed, as it was due for demolition, but no funds could be found for its restoration. By the early nineties it was run down and occupied by squatters before a fire destroyed the rear. By 1994 the old farmhouse was bought by developers who demolished the burnt out section illegally and in 1996, fifteen townhouses were built around it. The old farmhouse was modernized inside but the façade remains the same and has five original Jacaranda trees, possibly 90 to 100 years old. Regarded as the oldest brick house in Johannesburg it now stands in Frangipani Crescent, Randpark Ridge.

== Current suburb ==
The suburb is chiefly residential, with a few nodes for commerce along the major routes that service the area. It is well planned and forms part of Johannesburg's large man-made forest. Its proximity to both the city centre and Sandton make it an extremely popular area to live. It is, however, still close enough to the Magaliesburg so as to feel part of the countryside. The area is serviced by one highway, namely the N1 Western Bypass which connects the vicinity to Sandton and Pretoria to the north and to Roodepoort and Soweto to the south. The major arterial route is Beyers Naudé Drive (M5), which radiates from the inner city. Of importance are also John Vorster Drive and Ysterhout Drive (M6), as well as Christiaan de Wet Road (R564) running somewhat parallel to the freeway.

Rand Park High School along with Rand Park Primary School serve as the area's public schools. Trinityhouse High School, Newton House School and Aurora Private School are well-respected private schools in the area. The Randridge Mall and Rock Cottage are two well-known Randpark Ridge shopping malls, as well as the Lifestyle Garden Centre and several smaller malls exist for daily expenses. The prominent ridge (which gives the suburb its name) is protected as the Boschkop Nature Reserve, and is a prominent sight from most of western Johannesburg. Several parks abound including Essenhout Park and Hy Many Park. Much open land exists in the suburb especially to the west near to Honeydew.

Transport can be a problem for residents. The major routes are blocked in the morning and afternoon traffic, and this can make travel from the city centre much more difficult than usual. No train service runs near the area and thus it is buses and minibus taxis that offer the only public transport to residents. The nearest international airport is Lanseria Airport with the next closest international airport being OR Tambo International Airport in Ekurhuleni.
