= Jeff Coetzee =

South African tennis player (born 1977)

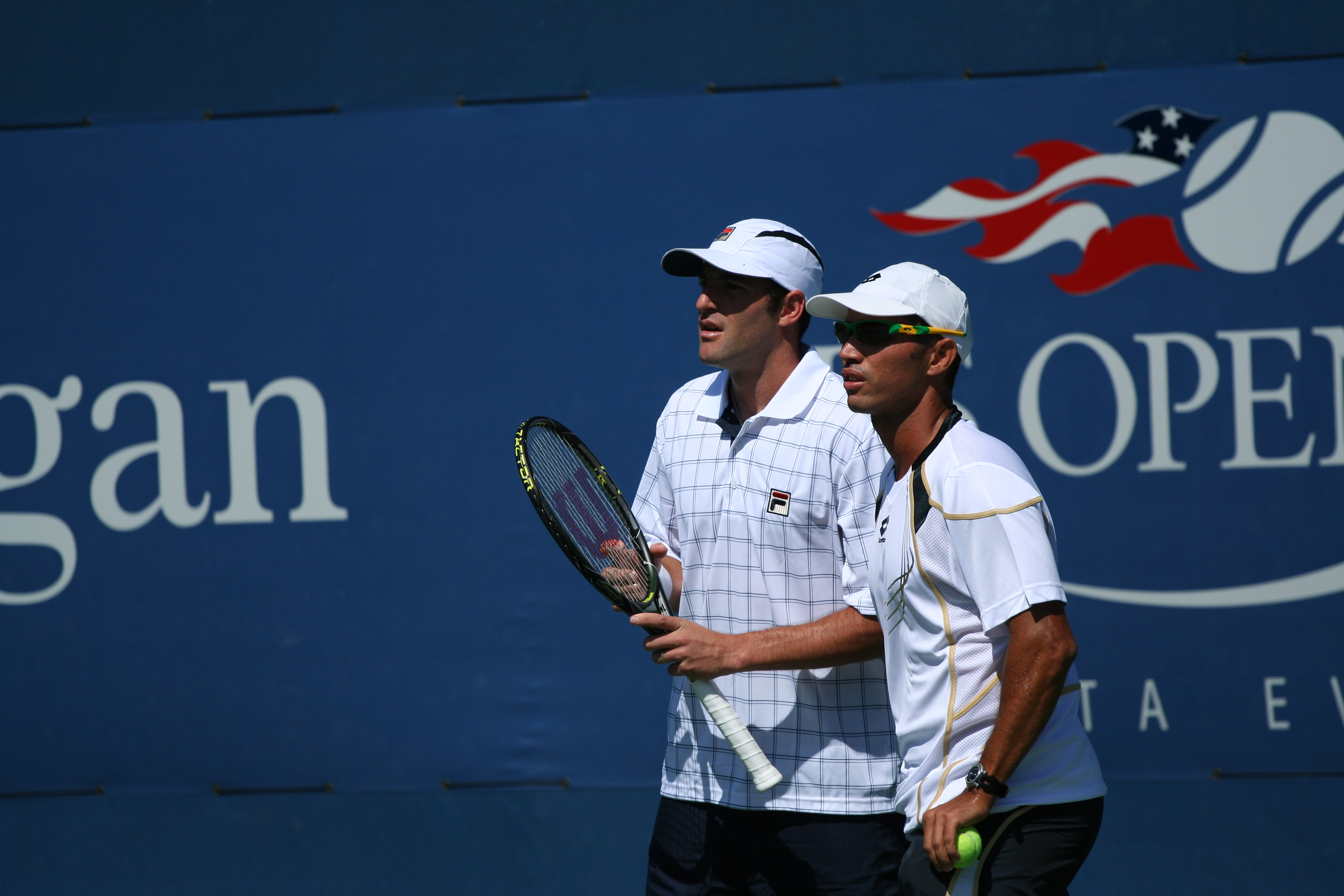
- Jeff Coetzee (right), with doubles partner Jonathan Erlich (left)
- Country (sports): South Africa
- Residence: Florida Hills, South Africa
- Born: 25 April 1977 (age 47); Okiep, South Africa
- Height: 1.72 m (5 ft 8 in)
- Turned pro: 1996
- Plays: Right-handed (two-handed both sides)
- Prize money: $970,175

Singles
- Career record: 0–3
- Career titles: 0
- Highest ranking: No. 184 (6 December 1999)

Grand Slam singles results
- Australian Open: Q2 (2000)
- French Open: Q1 (1999, 2000)
- Wimbledon: Q3 (1999)
- US Open: Q2 (2000)

Doubles
- Career record: 171–161
- Career titles: 6
- Highest ranking: No. 12 (3 November 2008)

Grand Slam doubles results
- Australian Open: SF (2003, 2008)
- French Open: 3R (2002, 2007)
- Wimbledon: 2R (2000, 2002, 2008, 2009)
- US Open: QF (1999)

Mixed doubles
- Career record: 3–19
- Career titles: 0

Grand Slam mixed doubles results
- Australian Open: 2R (2004)
- French Open: 1R (2007, 2008, 2009)
- Wimbledon: 2R (2007, 2008)
- US Open: 2R (2009)

Jeff Coetzee (born 25 April 1977) is a South African professional tennis player and competes regularly on the ATP tour, as a doubles specialist.

The 5'8" player plays right-handed, double-handed on both sides and has won six ATP Tour doubles titles in his career. Coetzee plays doubles for the South Africa Davis Cup team. When Jeff is not traveling, he resides in Florida Hills, South Africa.

== ATP Tour finals ==
=== Doubles (6–9) ===
Legend (doubles)
Grand Slam (0)
Tennis Masters Cup (0)
ATP Masters Series (0)
ATP International Series Gold (1)
ATP Tour (5)

Result	W/L	Date	Tournament	Surface	Partner	Opponents	Score
Win	1–0	Jul 2002	Amersfoort, Netherlands	Clay	(South Africa) Chris Haggard	(Brazil) André Sá (Brazil) Alexandre Simoni	7–6^{(7–1)}, 6–3
Loss	1–1	Sep 2002	Sopot, Poland	Clay	(Australia) Nathan Healey	(Czech Republic) František Čermák (Czech Republic) Leoš Friedl	5–7, 5–7
Win	2–1	Sep 2002	Tokyo, Japan	Hard	(South Africa) Chris Haggard	(United States) Jan-Michael Gambill (United States) Graydon Oliver	7–6^{(7–4)}, 6–4
Win	3–1	Dec 2002	Adelaide, Australia	Hard	(South Africa) Chris Haggard	(Belarus) Max Mirnyi (United States) Jeff Morrison	2–6, 6–4, 7–6^{(9–7)}
Loss	3–2	Sep 2003	Bucharest, Romania	Clay	(Sweden) Simon Aspelin	(Germany) Karsten Braasch (Armenia) Sargis Sargsian	6–7^{(7–9)}, 2–6
Loss	3–3	Feb 2004	Memphis, US	Hard	(South Africa) Chris Haggard	(United States) Bob Bryan (United States) Mike Bryan	3–6, 4–6
Loss	3–4	Mar 2004	Scottsdale, US	Hard	(South Africa) Chris Haggard	(United States) Rick Leach (United States) Brian MacPhie	3–6, 1–6
Loss	3–5	Oct 2005	Lyon, France	Carpet	(Netherlands) Rogier Wassen	(France) Michaël Llodra (France) Fabrice Santoro	3–6, 1–6
Win	4–5	Jan 2007	Auckland, New Zealand	Hard	(Netherlands) Rogier Wassen	(Sweden) Simon Aspelin (South Africa) Chris Haggard	6–7^{(9–11)}, 6–3, [10–2]
Win	5–5	Jun 2007	Rosmalen, Netherlands	Grass	(Netherlands) Rogier Wassen	(Czech Republic) Martin Damm (India) Leander Paes	3–6, 7–6^{(7–5)}, [12–10]
Loss	5–6	Jan 2008	Qatar Open, Doha	Hard	(South Africa) Wesley Moodie	(Germany) Philipp Kohlschreiber (Czech Republic) David Škoch	4–6, 6–4, [9–11]
Loss	5–7	Feb 2008	Marseille, France	Hard (i)	(Switzerland) Yves Allegro	(Czech Republic) Martin Damm (Czech Republic) Pavel Vízner	6–7^{(7–9)}, 5–7
Win	6–7	Apr 2008	Estoril, Portugal	Clay	(South Africa) Wesley Moodie	(United Kingdom) Jamie Murray (Zimbabwe) Kevin Ullyett	6–2, 4–6, [10–8]
Loss	6–8	Jun 2008	Nottingham, UK	Grass (Note: The final itself was played on indoor hard due to rain.)	(United Kingdom) Jamie Murray	(Brazil) Bruno Soares (Zimbabwe) Kevin Ullyett	2–6, 6–7^{(5–7)}
Loss	6–9	Nov 2008	Paris Masters, France	Hard (i)	(South Africa) Wesley Moodie	(Sweden) Jonas Björkman (Zimbabwe) Kevin Ullyett	2–6, 2–6

=== Doubles runners-up (10) ===
- 2006: Newport (with Justin Gimelstob, lost to Robert Kendrick and Jürgen Melzer)

== Doubles performance timeline ==
Key
W	F	SF	QF	#R	RR	Q#	DNQ	A	NH

(W) winner; (F) finalist; (SF) semifinalist; (QF) quarterfinalist; (#R) rounds 4, 3, 2, 1; (RR) round-robin stage; (Q#) qualification round; (DNQ) did not qualify; (A) absent; (NH) not held; (SR) strike rate (events won / competed); (W–L) win–loss record.

Tournament	1996	1997	1998	1999	2000	2001	2002	2003	2004	2005	2006	2007	2008	2009	2010	Career SR	Career win–loss
Grand Slam tournaments
Australian Open	A	A	A	1R	1R	1R	2R	SF	2R	2R	2R	QF	SF	2R	1R	0 / 12	16–12
French Open	A	A	A	A	1R	2R	3R	A	1R	A	1R	3R	2R	1R	1R	0 / 9	6–9
Wimbledon	A	A	Q3	A	2R	1R	2R	A	1R	1R	1R	1R	2R	2R	1R	0 / 10	4–10
US Open	A	A	Q1	QF	3R	Q1	1R	1R	1R	2R	2R	3R	1R	1R	A	0 / 10	9–11
Grand Slam SR	0 / 0	0 / 0	0 / 0	0 / 2	0 / 4	0 / 3	0 / 4	0 / 2	0 / 4	0 / 3	0 / 4	0 / 4	0 / 4	0 / 4	0 / 3	0 / 41	N/A
Annual win–loss	0–0	0–0	0–0	3–2	3–4	1–3	4–4	4–2	1–4	2–3	2–4	7–4	6–4	2–4	0–3	N/A	35–41
ATP Masters Series
Indian Wells	A	A	A	A	A	A	A	A	1R	A	A	1R	2R	1R	A	0 / 4	1–4
Miami	A	A	A	A	A	1R	A	A	1R	A	A	2R	SF	2R	A	0 / 5	5–5
Monte Carlo	A	A	A	A	A	A	A	A	A	A	A	A	SF	2R	A	0 / 2	3–2
Rome	A	A	A	A	A	A	A	A	A	A	A	A	2R	QF	A	0 / 2	1–2
Madrid (Stuttgart)	A	A	A	A	A	A	A	1R	A	A	A	QF	SF	1R	A	0 / 4	4–4
Canada	A	A	A	A	A	A	A	A	A	A	A	A	QF	2R	A	0 / 2	3–2
Cincinnati	A	A	A	A	A	A	A	A	A	A	A	A	A	1R	A	0 / 1	0–1
Shanghai	Not Held													1R	A	0 / 1	0–1
Paris	A	A	A	A	A	A	1R	A	A	A	A	2R	F	1R	A	0 / 4	3–4
Hamburg	A	A	A	A	A	A	A	A	2R	A	A	A	A	NM1		0 / 7	5–7
Masters Series SR	0 / 0	0 / 0	0 / 0	0 / 0	0 / 0	0 / 1	0 / 1	0 / 1	0 / 3	0 / 0	0 / 0	0 / 4	0 / 8	0 / 9	0 / 0	0 / 32	N/A
Annual win–loss	0–0	0–0	0–0	0–0	0–0	0–1	0–1	0–1	1–3	0–0	0–0	4–4	13–7	3–9	0–0	N/A	25–32
Year-end ranking	389	275	124	79	87	134	42	61	62	66	54	29	12	69	123	N/A	
