= Weltevreden =

Weltevreden may refer to:

- Sawah Besar, a subdistrict of Central Jakarta, Indonesia, the core of the larger colonial district of Weltevreden in Batavia, Java
- Weltevreden, Java, a district in the Dutch East Indies, consisting parts of the modern-day subdistricts of Sawah Besar, Gambir, Senen and Menteng in Central Jakarta
- Weltevreden (Berkeley, California), USA, a house designed by A. C. Schweinfurth, also known as Moody House and later as Tellefsen Hall

== See also ==
- Weltevrede, Western Cape, South Africa
- Weltevredenpark, a suburb of Roodepoort, South Africa adjacent to Johannesburg
