= South African National Blood Service =

Non-profit organization

- Abbreviation: SANBS
- Formation: 2001; 25 years ago
- Headquarters: 1 Constantia Blvd
- Location: Roodepoort, South Africa
- Coordinates: 26.1548°S 27.9243°E
- Website: https://sanbs.org.za/

The South African National Blood Service (SANBS) is a non-profit organization that provides human blood for transfusion that operates in South Africa, with the exception of the Western Cape, which has its own blood service. The head office of the SANBS is in Constantia Kloof, Gauteng, near Johannesburg, but there are blood collection operations in eight of the nine provinces. Western Cape has a separate blood centre, the Western Cape Blood Service. SANBS was founded in 2001 from a merger of seven blood centres, and was embroiled in controversy in 2004 over a policy of racial profiling for blood safety.

The SANBS appointed Dr. Jonathan Louw as its CEO in January 2018.

Dr Louw founded Healthwyse Consulting and prior to this, he was MD at the Abraaj Group (a Dubai-based private equity investment company). Louw was at JSE-Listed Adcock Ingram and Tiger brands from 2001 to 2014, serving in a variety of capacities from New Business Development, MD of Pharmaceuticals (2003 to 2006) and then Chief Executive at Adcock Ingram (2006 to 2014). He has an MB.ChB (1993) and an MBA (1999), both from the University of Cape Town.

Dr Louw was succeeded by Ravi Reddy in January 2021.

== Blood donation ==
SANBS collects blood from volunteer unpaid donors and processes that blood into components for transfusion. The donors are screened for health risks and tested for diseases on every donation. Not all parts of the donated blood are always used, such as with first time donors, to establish a history of negative test results in the donor before the blood is used in patients. The red blood cells from the first donation are discarded because they cannot be stored long enough to wait for a second donation and a second set of testing, but the blood plasma can be frozen and used.

SANBS relies on donors that return consistently, as the history of testing makes it less likely to miss a positive result from a laboratory error or from a donation in the window period. Testing has included nucleic acid testing (NAT) since 2005, which directly detects the virus instead of waiting for the body to develop an antibody. This test shortens but does not eliminate the window period. SANBS performs NAT testing for each individual donor, instead of in pools. NAT testing is expensive, and blood banks in many countries, such as Canada, perform the testing on pooled donor samples. The individual testing is more sensitive to window period donations. The testing is performed at central laboratories in Johannesburg and Durban.

Whole blood is collected to make packed red blood cells and plasma for transfusion. Plasma and platelets for transfusion are also collected by automated plateletpheresis. Collections take place at fixed sites, but SANBS also collects blood on mobile blood drives at community locations such as shopping centres. The blood is then processed into components at seven processing locations throughout South Africa. During 2008, SANBS collected 718,962 donations of Whole Blood and 11,657 donations of apheresis platelets.

== Other services ==
SANBS also provides blood-related laboratory services such as paternity testing and the HLA typing of bone marrow donors, though the actual bone marrow donations are handled by the Sunflower Fund, a separate organisation. The organisation also prepares an annual haemovigilance report on transfusion complications, conducts research, and provides clinical training.

== History ==
The organisation was founded in 2001 from the merging of seven independent blood banks.

== Criticism ==
The organisation came under fire in 2004 when it was revealed that they used the race of a donor as a consideration in determining disease risk. SANBS stated that the profiling was necessary to reduce the risk of transmission of human immunodeficiency virus (HIV), citing World Health Organization policy for not collecting blood from high risk groups. Health minister Manto Tshabalala-Msimang raised concerns that the policy was racist. SANBS changed the policy later that week. Dr. Loyiso Mpuntsha, a black woman who was once rejected as a blood donor, was the SANBS CEO until March 2015.

Previously, the SANBS also excluded homosexual males who have had sex with another male within five years, as the SANBS saw them as high risk carriers of HIV/AIDS. After an outcry, this ruling was changed in 2006 to allow homosexual men to donate, provided that they have been celibate for at least six months. This policy was amended in 2014 to allow all sexes and orientations to donate, provided that they have been either celibate or in monogamous relationships for the previous six months.

== See also ==
- Transfusion medicine
