= Florida, Gauteng =

Florida
- Location within Gauteng Location within South Africa
- Coordinates: 26.175°S 27.923°E
- Country: South Africa
- Province: Gauteng
- Municipality: City of Johannesburg
- Main Place: Roodepoort
- Established: 1890

Area
  - Total: 6.32 km^{2} (2.44 sq mi)

Population (2011)
  - Total: 20,082
  - Density: 3,180/km^{2} (8,230/sq mi)

Racial makeup (2011)
  - Black African: 35.9%
  - Coloured: 29.6%
  - Indian/Asian: 9.5%
  - White: 23.1%
  - Other: 1.8%

First languages (2011)
  - English: 48.1%
  - Afrikaans: 23.6%
  - Zulu: 8.2%
  - Tswana: 5.2%
  - Other: 14.9%
- Time zone: UTC+2 (SAST)
- Postal code (street): 1709
- PO box: 1710
- Area code: 010

Florida is a location in Gauteng province, South Africa. It is located about 16 kilometres west of Johannesburg. The area which is referred to as Florida was originally established as the farm Vogelstruisfontein. Today, it is a suburb of Roodepoort.

== History ==
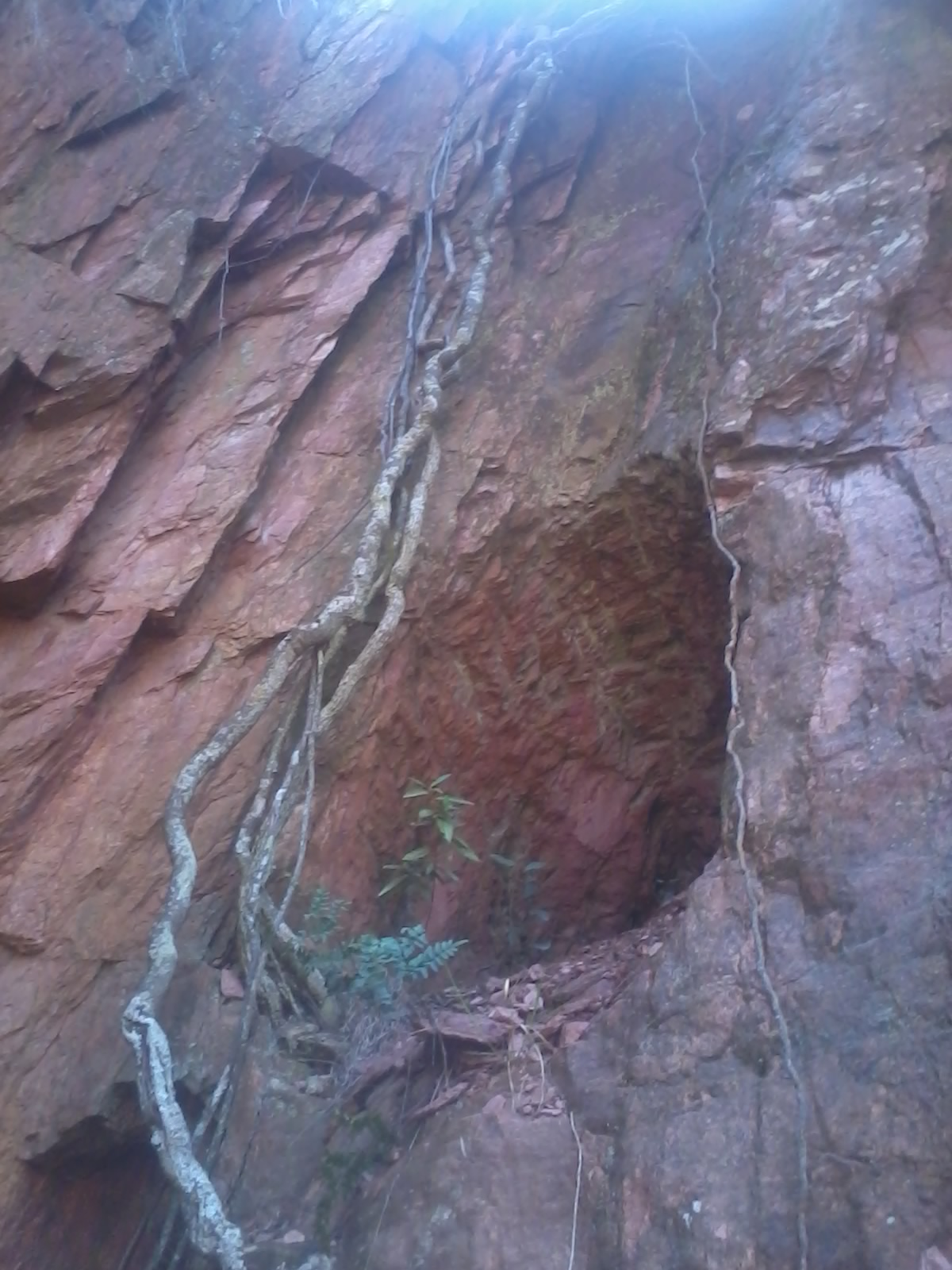
Confidence Reef Mines

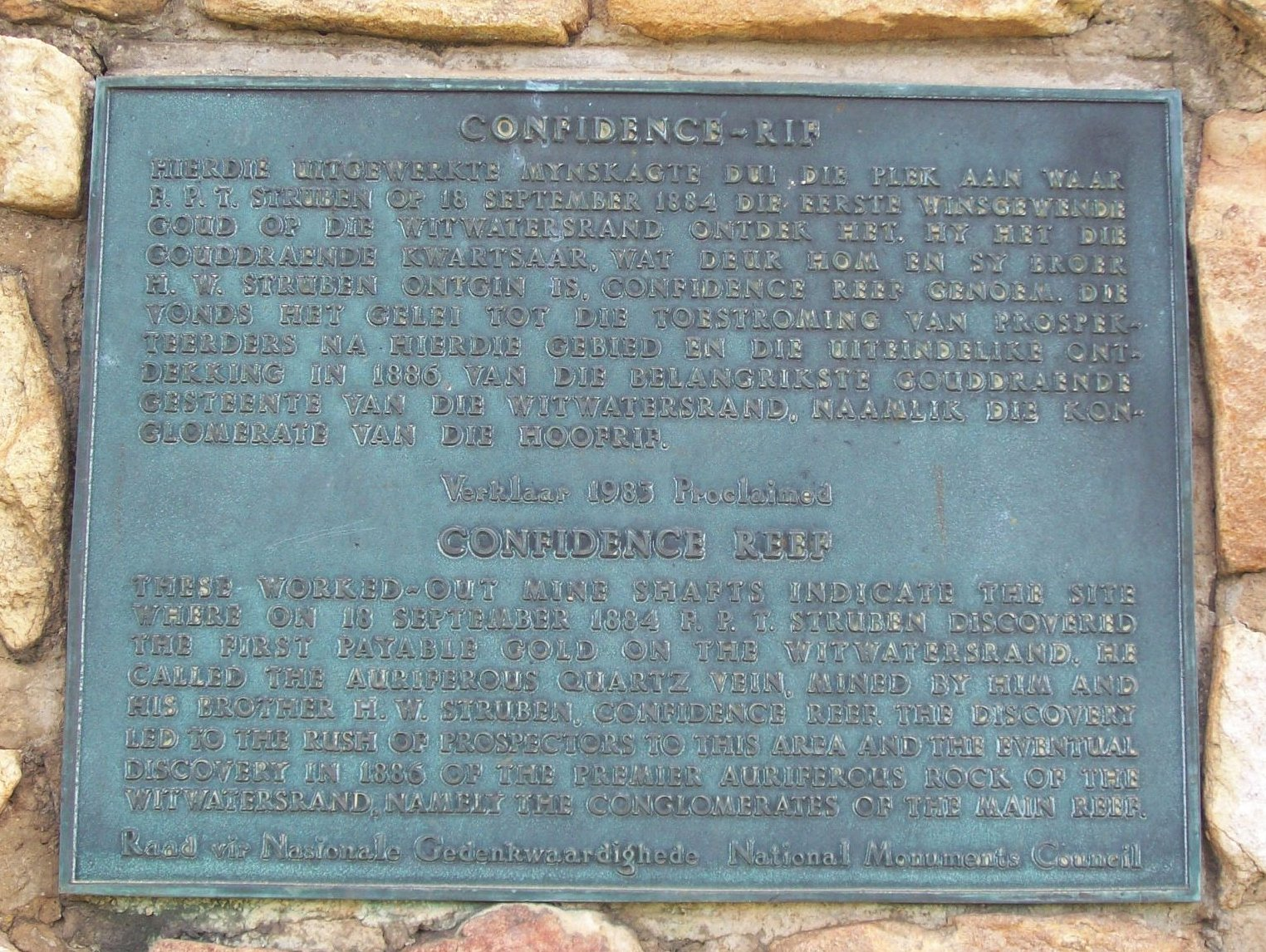
Plaque at Confidence Reef

Vogelstruisfontein and the farms Roodepoort and Paardekraal were established as mining camps after the discovery of gold in 1881. The suburb was laid out in 1889 and then proclaimed the following year on 14 April 1890 and by 1904 became a suburb of Roodepoort. It was either named after Florida, USA or the suburb's originator Hendrik van Hoven whose late niece was called Florrie.

== Geography ==
=== Communities ===
Although Florida was declared as a white area during apartheid, more than half of Florida's residents today are coloured. This is mainly because it is in close proximity to the coloured townships of Bosmont, Coronationville, Newclare, Westbury and Riverlea. Florida Lake is a large area of water south of the railway line. It is flanked by residential properties to the north, and parklands to the east and west.

The main road through Florida, Goldman Street, forms the spine for local business activity and civic services. The local library is one of the best facilities of its kind in the Greater Johannesburg region. The western end of Goldman street is home to a number of antique dealers specialising in Afrikana furniture.

== Economy ==
=== Retail ===
Flora Centre is located in Florida Hills and is Florida's largest and most popular shopping centre.

== Sports ==
The local sports field at Trezona Park is the home to Florida Albion Football Club as well as having facilities for hockey, cricket, tennis and squash.

== Education ==
It is served by Arthur Matthews Primary School, Florida Primary School, Florida Park High School, Afrikaans language Hoërskool Florida and Laerskool Florida as well as private schools such as Victory House Private School and Royal King's School. It is also served by Saint Catherine's Convent: a private all-girls Catholic School. It also is home to a number of pre-schools; most notably, Barbara's Pre-Play School, which was established in 1984.

== Infrastructure ==
=== Transportation ===
The railway station is on the Springs to Randfontein line with easy access to Johannesburg.
