= Northmead Square =

Shopping centre in Benoni, South Africa

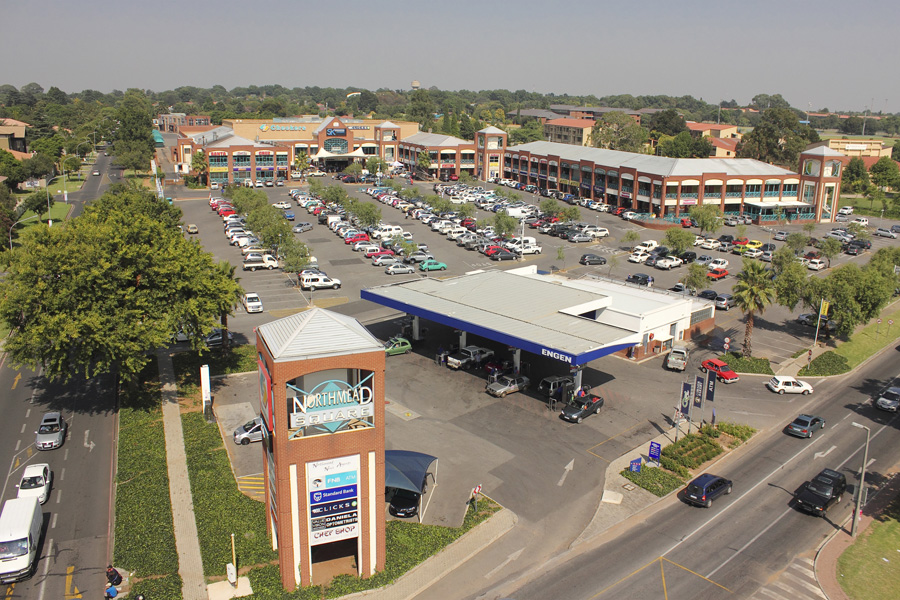
Aerial view of Northmead Square.

Opened in 1998, Northmead Square is known as the first shopping centre to bring cinemas back to the South African town of Benoni in Ekurhuleni, Gauteng. The last remaining cinema had closed in the 80s. Northmead Square is a community centre that services people within a 5 km radius, though because it has regional branches of three of South Africa's banks (FNB, Nedbank and Standard Bank) members of the public do come from greater distances. Family-run and maintained by the Coutsides family, Northmead Square is popular and is affectionately known as "The Square."

== History ==
The property on which Northmead Square was built has been owned by the Coutsides family since 1961. The house that originally existed there was known as "The Pink House" and was a portion of the property known as "Beckett's Farm". In the 90s when the proposed shopping centre was being planned opposition came from the surrounding neighbours and some businesses which delayed the development. Construction eventually went ahead as planned and the centre was opened by the ANC's politician Sicelo Shiceka.

== Community involvement ==
Northmead Square hosts an annual "Shavathon" with the national cancer charity CANSA. March 2012 saw approximately R43000 being raised at the Centre, the most successful entrant in Eastern Gauteng having raised more than even regional centres such as East Rand Mall.

A performing artist by the name of Kassio used Northmead Square as the stage for an act in 2012.

The Benoni Lions Rotarian Club and the South African National Blood Service host quarterly blood drives at Northmead Square which are generally well attended.

Charlene, Princess of Monaco visited Northmead Square for lunch in February 2011. She grew up in Benoni and most of her family still live there.

Cenestra Male Choir performed at Northmead Square on 1 July 2012, at Northmead Square's 14 year anniversary celebration. The 46-voice Cenestra Male Choir was selected to perform at the Wales Choir of the World as part of a pre-celebration for the London Olympics 2012. Over R55000 was collected to at the event to help the choir fund their trip overseas.

== Benoni City Times ==
Benoni's local newspaper opened their doors at Northmead Square in 2004. The Benoni City Times celebrated their 100th birthday in 2011.
