= 10th Cruiser Squadron =

- Active: 1913–1917, 1940–1946
- Country: United Kingdom
- Allegiance: British Empire
- Branch: Royal Navy
- Engagements: Battle of the North Cape

Commanders
- Notable commanders: Rear-Admiral Sir Dudley R. S. de Chair

The 10th Cruiser Squadron, also known as Cruiser Force B, was a formation of cruisers of the British Royal Navy from 1913 to 1917 and then again from 1940 to 1946.

== First formation ==
The squadron was established in July 1913 and allocated to the Third Fleet. In July 1914 it was reassigned to the new Grand Fleet, the squadron was also made Cruiser Force B in August 1914 but was more famously known as the Northern Patrol. It remained with the Grand Fleet until December 1917.

Rear-Admiral Commanding, 10th Cruiser Squadron/Cruiser Force B
| | Rank | Flag | Name | Term | Notes |
|---|---|---|---|---|---|
| 1 | Rear-Admiral | Rear-Admiral - Royal Navy | Edmund Pears | 15 July 1913 – 29 June 1914 | RAdm-Comm, 10th Cruiser Squadron |
| 2 | Rear-Admiral | Rear-Admiral - Royal Navy | Charles Napier | 13–26 July 1914 | RAdm-Comm, 10th Cruiser Squadron |
| 3 | Rear-Admiral | Rear-Admiral - Royal Navy | Dudley de Chair | 1 August 1914 – 6 March 1916. | RAdm-Comm, Cruiser Force B (the Northern Patrol) |
| 4 | Vice-Admiral | Vice-Admiral - Royal Navy | Sir Reginald Tupper | 6 March 1916 – 8 December 1917 | RAdm-Comm, Cruiser Force B (the Northern Patrol) |

The squadron was disbanded from January 1918 to 1937

== Second formation ==
On 22 March 1937 the Admiralty announced the temporary formation of the squadron for the coronation fleet review by King George VI on 20 April 1937. The squadron was commanded by Rear-Admiral Arthur Dowding.

== Third formation ==
The squadron reformed in September 1940 and attached to the Home Fleet for the duration of the Second World War until September 1945. On 27 December 1942, it was engaged at the Battle of the Barents Sea as Force R. On 22 December 1943 the squadron was involved in the Battle of the North Cape where it was called Force 2. In October 1946 the squadron was renamed the 2nd Cruiser Squadron and assigned to the Mediterranean Fleet.

Flag Officer Commanding, 10th Cruiser Squadron
| | Rank | Flag | Name | Term | Notes |
|---|---|---|---|---|---|
| 1 | Rear-Admiral | Rear-Admiral - Royal Navy | Harold Burrough | 10 September 1940 – August 1942 | FO 10th Cruiser Squadron |
| 2 | Rear-Admiral | Rear-Admiral - Royal Navy | Cecil Harcourt | August 1942 – 12 January 1943 | (ditto) |
| 3 | Rear-Admiral | Rear-Admiral - Royal Navy | Robert Burnett | 12 January 1943 – 3 March 1944 | (ditto), promoted to VAdm 09/1943 |
| 4 | Rear-Admiral | Rear-Admiral - Royal Navy | Frederick Dalrymple-Hamilton | 3 March 1944 – 8 April 1945 | (ditto) |
| 5 | Rear-Admiral | Rear-Admiral - Royal Navy | Angus Cunningham-Grahame | 8 April 1945 – October 1946 | (ditto) |
