= Edith Frances Mary Struben =

South African painter (1868–1936)

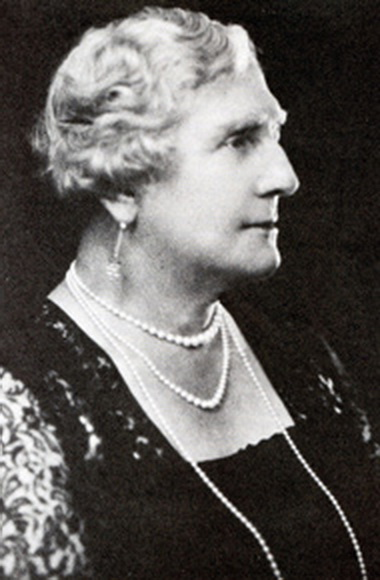
- Born: 1868; Pretoria, South Africa
- Died: 21 October 1936; Newlands, Cape Town
- Occupation: Artist
- Father: Harry Struben
- Relatives: Enid de Chair (sister)

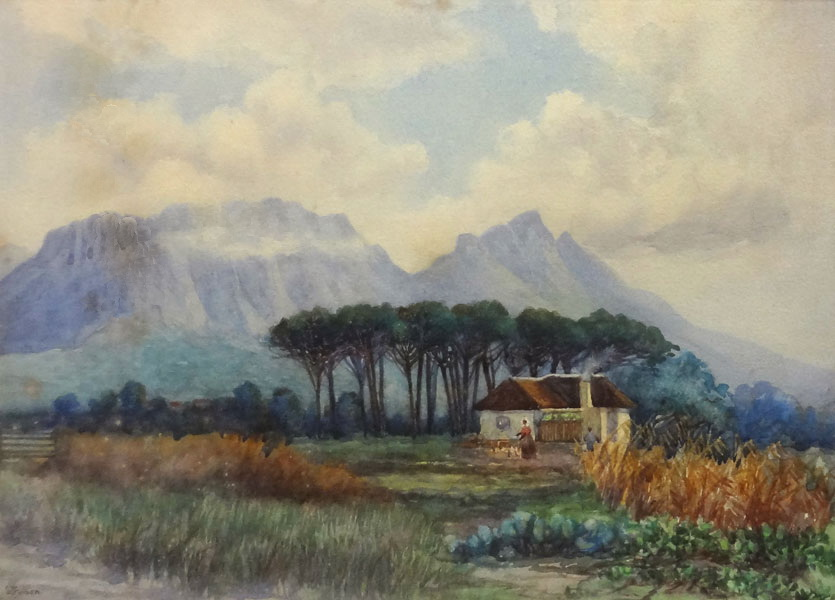
Scene at Tokai, Cape Town

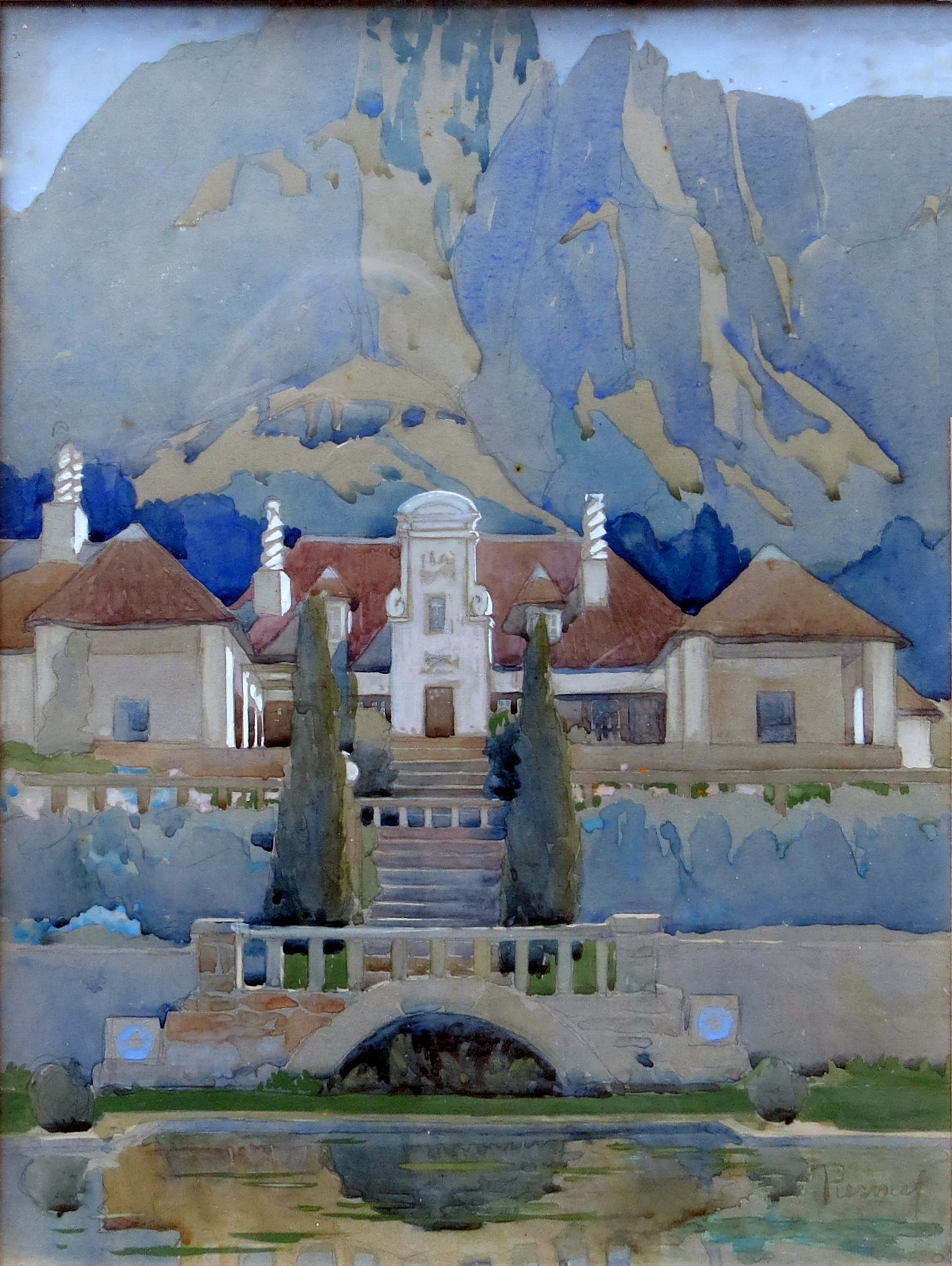
'Luncarty' by Pierneef

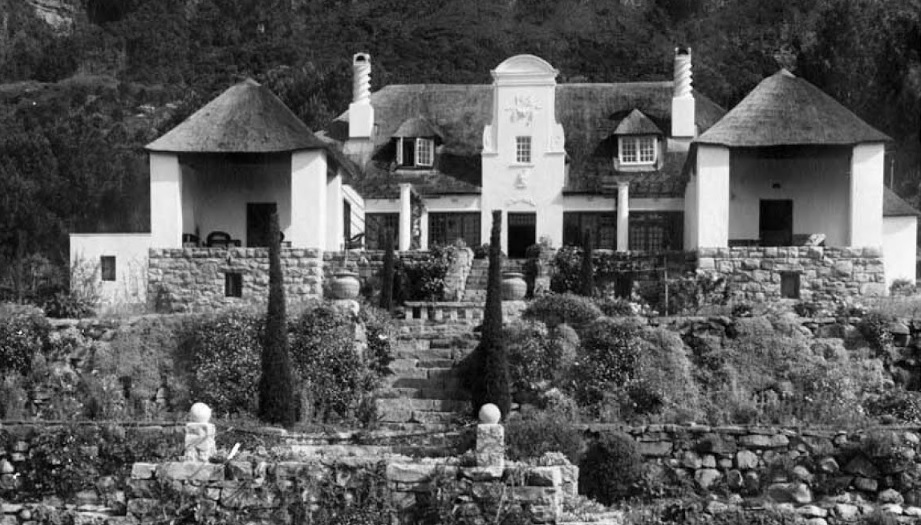
Luncarty, home of Edith Struben

Edith Frances Mary Struben (1868 - 21 October 1936) was a South African botanical illustrator and painter. She was the eldest daughter of Harry Struben, a pioneer gold miner on the Witwatersrand.

In 1885 Fred and Harry Struben discovered alluvial gold on the farm Wilgespruit (now the Kloofendal Nature Reserve) in Roodepoort. At that stage Edith was a mature 16-year-old and taking care of Charles (9) and Enid (5) since their mother was frail and living in Pietermaritzburg. She did the housekeeping of a small cottage at Little Falls, cooked for the two youngsters and schooled them at home. She also found time to sew and paint, depicting the wild flowers she came across, landscapes, and the tented camp close to the mining operations. Fred and Harry eventually sold all their claims and property and retired to Cape Town. Harry built 'Strubenheim', a mansion which currently serves the Music Department of the University of Cape Town. The family counted Rudyard Kipling and Cecil John Rhodes as close friends.

Edith studied fine art in Paris, Rome and London, returning to South Africa in 1901 and exhibiting her watercolour landscapes regularly. She became one of the first members of the South African Society of Artists. Her works are in the collections of the Africana Museum in Johannesburg, the Pretoria Art Museum and the South African National Gallery in Cape Town.

In 1920 she took over 'Luncarty', a Cape Peninsula gabled house in Upper Holly Street, Newlands, Cape Town and close to Kirstenbosch. This had been designed by Francis Kaye Kendall who was one of the business partners of Herbert Baker, for Commander Sereld Hay of the Royal Naval Volunteer Reserve, South African Division.

She was a staunch supporter of the early Botanical Society of South Africa, being vice-president at the time of her death in 1936. Her exposure to the garden stonework and paths of Italy and the Mediterranean led to her involvement in the planning and execution of the stone paths at Kirstenbosch.

The succulent Mesembryanthemum strubeniae L.Bolus now known as Ruschia strubeniae Schwantes was named in Edith's honour by her friend Louisa Bolus, as was Watsonia strubeniae L.Bolus.

The death of Miss Edith Struben, which took place in October, robs the Botanical Society of an active Life Member and Vice-President, and Kirstenbosch of a true friend. At Luncarty, near Kirstenbosch, she had created a garden of great charm and beauty, the part on the slopes above her house being devoted to indigenous plants which were her special pride. In her oil paintings she had depicted the marvellous forms and colours of the Cape wild flowers, and it was also her pleasure to record in cinematograph films their vivid colouring as seen at Kirstenbosch or in Namaqualand. She was a vigorous advocate of wild flower protection, and as a member of the Council of the Botanical Society she constantly urged the necessity for drastic action to prevent wild flower destruction by whatever agency. By her will she bequeathed to Kirstenbosch £200 to be used for a special piece of development and for the preservation of wild flowers in danger of extinction, and also her collection of books on botanical and horticultural subjects.

— Obituary in 'The Journal of the Botanical Society of South Africa'

== Family ==
Edith's siblings were Arthur, Gertrude, Beatrice Mary, Fredrick, Robert, Charles, and Enid. Enid eventually married Commander Dudley de Chair (1864-1958) in 1903 in Torwood near Torquay, Devon.
