= Florida Glen =

- Location within Gauteng Location within South Africa
- Coordinates: 26.165°S 27.943°E
- Country: South Africa
- Province: Gauteng
- Municipality: City of Johannesburg
- Main Place: Roodepoort

Area
  - Total: 1.13 km^{2} (0.44 sq mi)

Population (2011)
  - Total: 3,400
  - Density: 3,000/km^{2} (7,800/sq mi)

Racial makeup (2011)
  - Black African: 15.5%
  - Coloured: 14.2%
  - Indian/Asian: 10.5%
  - White: 58.5%
  - Other: 1.3%

First languages (2011)
  - English: 48.8%
  - Afrikaans: 37.3%
  - Tswana: 2.7%
  - Sotho: 2.5%
  - Other: 8.6%
- Time zone: UTC+2 (SAST)
- Postal code (street): 1709
- PO box: 1708

Florida Glen is a small, primarily residential suburb on the eastern edge of the city of Roodepoort. The N1 freeway (Western Bypass) runs through Florida Glen, and intersects at the Gordon Road offramp. The main road through Florida Glen was Lange Ave, until the building of the N1 Western Bypass in the 1980s, which diverted traffic onto the busy Gordon Road. Florida Glen is flanked by Quellerina to the north and Delarey to the south, Bergbron and Northcliff to the east, and Florida Hills, and Newlands to the west. For many years its residents were Afrikaans- and English-speaking white middle-class families. In the 1990s and following it became an attractive suburb for black, coloured and indian middle-class families from nearby Coronation, Newlands, Soweto and Lenasia, as it is easily accessible from the city and the N1 Western Bypass. Florida Glen has no schools of its own, and there are few churches and community centres - notably the NG Kerk Florida Glen which is visible from the Western Bypass, with its large steel spire.

In the early 1980s a small shopping mall was built at the intersection of Lange Avenue and Gordon Road called "the Glen".
