= R560 (South Africa) =

Regional route in South Africa

Regional route R560

Route information
- Length: 40 km (25 mi)

Major junctions
- South-west end: R24 near Magaliesburg
- R563 near Hekpoort
- North-east end: R512 near Hartbeespoort

Location
- Country: South Africa

Highway system
- Numbered routes of South Africa
← R559	→ R561

The R560 is a Regional Route in South Africa that connects Magaliesburg with Hartbeespoort.

== Route ==
Its western origin is the R24 near Magaliesburg in Gauteng. It heads north-east, intersecting with the R563's north-western terminus at Hekpoort, then crossing into the North West at Skeerpoort and reaching its end at an intersection with the R512 (Pampoen Nek Highway) on the western edge of Hartbeespoort Dam (west of Hartbeespoort and north-west of Broederstroom).
