= Confidence Reef =

Heritage Site

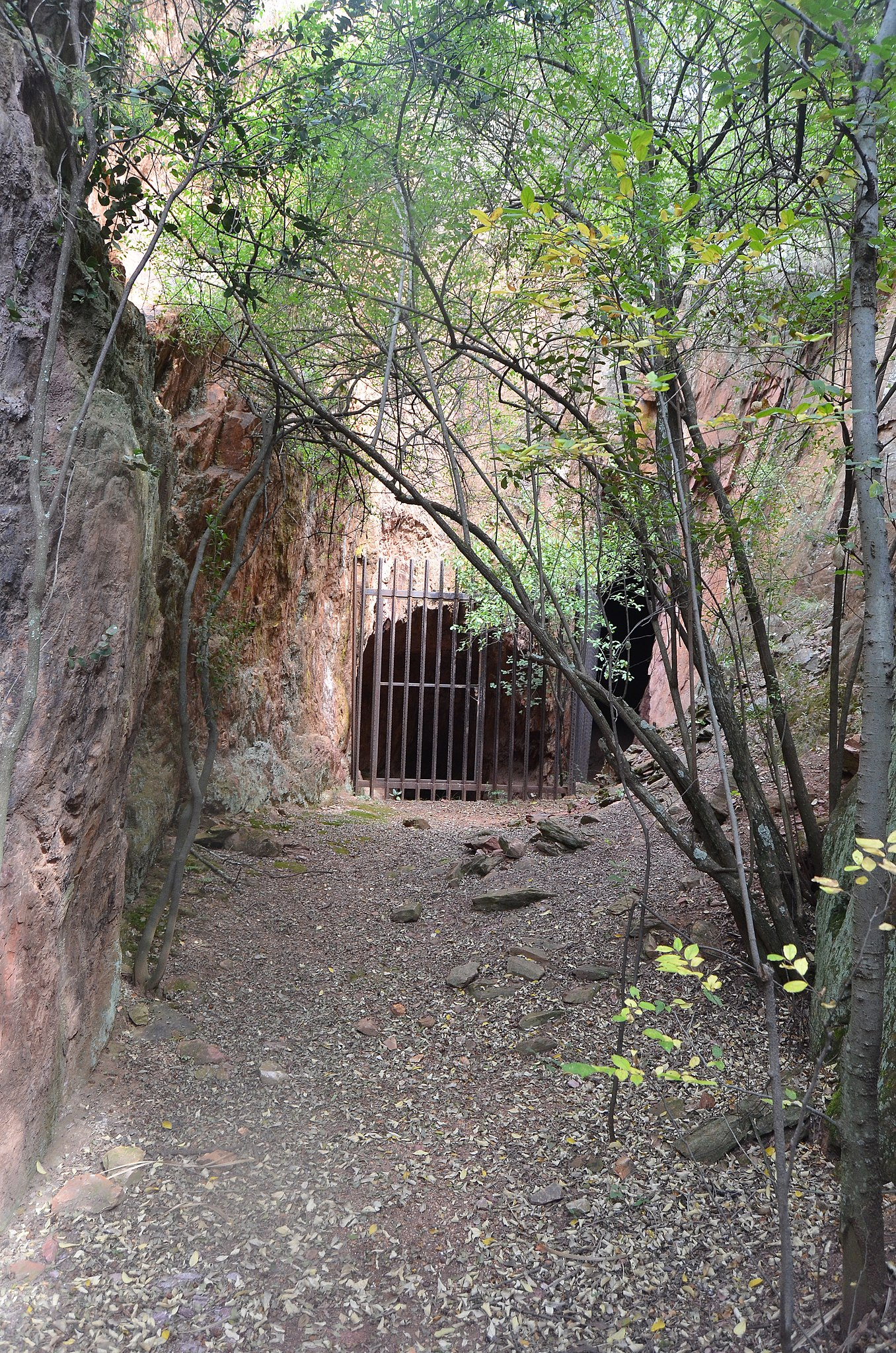
- Interactive map of Confidence Reef
- 26.135810°S 27.882030°E
- Type: Heritage Site
- Nearest city: Roodepoort, South Africa

History
- Founded: 1884
- Founder: Fred Pine Theophilus Struben

Confidence Reef is a historical gold-bearing quartz vein situated within the Kloofendal Nature Reserve, in close proximity to Roodepoort, South Africa.

== Discovery ==
The Confidence Reef was discovered by Fred Pine Theophilus Struben and his brother, Harry Struben, on September 18, 1884, on the farm Wilgespruit in Roodepoort, Johannesburg. This discovery was pivotal in sparking a gold rush to the Witwatersrand region, which eventually led to the discovery of the Main Reef in 1886. The Struben brothers were the first to extract payable gold from the Witwatersrand.

== South Africa's gold mining industry ==
The Confidence Reef is notable as the first site of a payable gold discovery on the Witwatersrand, an event that contributed to the establishment of Johannesburg, the "City of Gold.'' The discovery spurred the development of other major gold mines, including the Main Reef in 1886, one of the richest gold-bearing areas in history. This find also led to the creation of the Witwatersrand Gold Mining Company, along with others like the Jubilee and Langlaagte mines. The techniques and infrastructure introduced during this early phase, such as stamp mills for ore processing, formed the foundation for modern mining practices and facilitated Johannesburg's rise as a major global player in the gold industry.

== Geology ==
The Confidence Reef is part of the larger Witwatersrand Basin, which is renowned as one of the richest goldfields in the world. The basin is made up of complex sedimentary rock formations deposited around 2.9 to 2.7 Ga in the Mesoarchaean era.

=== Formation and composition ===
The Witwatersrand Basin's sedimentary layers consist of conglomerates, quartzites, and shales that were deposited in a shallow marine environment. These rock sequences, which can exceed 7,000 m in thickness, contain gold-bearing conglomerates formed through mechanical reworking of sediments and microbial fixation.

=== Gold mineralization ===
The origin of the gold within the Witwatersrand Basin is thought to be a combination of placer deposition and hydrothermal processes. Gold deposits are concentrated at the base of fluvial cycles within the Central Rand Group, with ancient microbial activity playing a role in the fixation of organic materials and enhancing gold concentration. This Gold is found in ancient sedimentary rocks, primarily in conglomerates. The unique gold mineralization processes in this basin have been the subject of much debate, with two primary theories dominating the discussion: the placer theory and the hydrothermal theory. Both of these processes are thought to have contributed to the important gold concentration in the area.

==== Placer deposition theory ====
The placer theory suggests that gold originated from ancient greenstone belts surrounding the Witwatersrand Basin. Rivers carried gold-rich sediments from these areas, depositing them in alluvial fans and river channels. Over time, the gold settled into the basin's conglomerate layers, which were formed by fluvial processes during the Mesoarchaean era

- Detrital gold: The gold in the basin is thought to have been transported as particles (detrital gold) that were deposited along with other heavy minerals such as chromite, zircon, and pyrite. These minerals were concentrated in specific layers, or "reefs", at the base of the conglomerate sequences
- Cyanobacteria and microbial fixation: Research indicates that microbial life, particularly cyanobacteria, played a role in the formation of these gold deposits. Cyanobacteria contributed organic material that enhanced the concentration of gold by fixing the gold particles within microbial mats.

==== Hydrothermal activity theory ====
The hydrothermal theory suggests that gold was introduced or remobilized in the Witwatersrand Basin by hot, mineral-rich fluids that permeated the basin after the sediments had been deposited.

- Hydrothermal fluids: These fluids, derived from deep within the Earth's crust, migrated through faults and fractures within the sedimentary layers, precipitating gold and other minerals as they cooled. The presence of pyrite and carbon-rich shales in the same rock sequences suggests that hydrothermal processes likely altered the original placer deposits, concentrating gold further.
- Remobilization of gold: The gold may have been remobilized and concentrated by tectonic activity, particularly during the Vredefort impact event, a massive meteorite strike that altered the structure and mineral content of the Witwatersrand Basin. The intense pressure and heat generated by the impact are believed to have played a role in the redistribution of gold within the conglomerate layers.

=== Tectonic events ===
Several tectonic events, including faulting and folding, shaped the Witwatersrand Basin. The Vredefort impact, one of Earth's largest meteorite impacts, also altered the distribution of gold, remobilizing the mineral within the basin's sedimentary layers. Further geological processes, such as the intrusion of the Bushveld Igneous Complex, introduced heat that facilitated additional gold mobilization.

== Historical importance ==
The Struben brothers were engaged in active mining operations at Confidence Reef until 1888, extracting gold from a quartz vein that they had discovered. Following their departure, the site retained its importance within South Africa's mining history. In 1935, Fred Struben's wife, Mabel, sold the area to George Brown, who proceeded to continue mining operations on the site. With the passage of time, the importance of the Confidence Reef grew, not only in terms of its role in mining activities but also in relation to its status as a site of South African heritage.

In recognition of its historical value, the Confidence Reef Mine was proclaimed a national monument in 1980. This designation showed the importance of the early gold mining efforts that contributed to the later development of the Witwatersrand Gold Rush. The Confidence Reef is located within the Walter Sisulu National Botanical Garden in Roodepoort, South Africa, making it accessible for educational visits and a reminder of the country's rich mining heritage.

=== Monuments ===
In 1936, George Brown erected a monument to commemorate the Struben brothers' contribution to the discovery of the gold-bearing conglomerates in the Witwatersrand. This monument, located at the Confidence Reef site, honors their role in the birth of Johannesburg and South Africa's gold industry.

== See also ==
- Geography of South Africa
