= Egoli Granite Grassland =

Critically endangered South African grassland

Egoli Granite Grassland is a vegetation type endemic to the Gauteng province of South Africa. It is associated with the Halfway House Granite Dome, a geological feature that extends across much of northern Johannesburg. Due to its restricted range and habitat loss from urban development, it is listed as a critically endangered ecosystem under the South African National Environmental Management: Biodiversity Act (NEMBA).

== Ecology ==
The grassland occurs at altitudes ranging from 1,280 to 1,660 meters above sea level. It is characterized by a high diversity of grasses and forbs, with woody species restricted to rocky outcrops. Dominant grass species include Aristida canescens, Digitaria monodactyla, and Themeda triandra.

The region experiences a warm-temperate climate with distinct wet summers and dry, cold winters. Species in this ecosystem have adapted to environmental constraints such as fire and seasonal drought through the development of underground storage organs, including bulbs and rhizomes, which allow the plants to regenerate during the growing season.

== Conservation ==
As of the mid-2010s, approximately 60% of the original extent of the Egoli Granite Grassland had been transformed by urbanization and infrastructure development. Less than 3% of the ecosystem remains under formal protection.

Under the National Environmental Management Act (NEMA), environmental authorization is required for the removal of more than 300 square meters of indigenous vegetation in this area. Conservation efforts focus on protecting remnants of the grassland, such as those found at the Walter Sisulu National Botanical Garden and the Melville Koppies Nature Reserve.
