= Dudley de Chair =

Royal Navy Admiral and Governor of New South Wales (1864–1958)

Admiral Sir Dudley de Chair KCB KCMG MVO
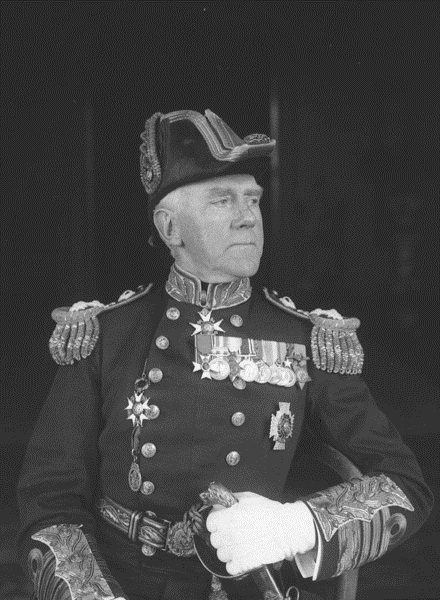

25th Governor of New South Wales
- In office 28 February 1924 – 9 April 1930
- Monarch: George V
- Lieutenant: Sir William Cullen; Sir Philip Street
- Preceded by: Sir Walter Davidson
- Succeeded by: Sir Phillip Game

Personal details
- Born: 30 August 1864 Lennoxville, Province of Canada
- Died: 17 August 1958 (aged 93) Brighton, England
- Spouse: Enid Struben (m. 1903)
- Children: 3, including Somerset

Military service
- Allegiance: United Kingdom
- Branch/service: Royal Navy
- Years of service: 1878–1923
- Rank: Admiral
- Unit: HMS Alexandra
- Commands: Coastguard and Reserves; Third Battle Squadron; 10th Cruiser Squadron
- Battles/wars: Anglo-Egyptian War; First World War
- Awards: Knight Commander of the Order of the Bath; Knight Commander of the Order of St Michael and St George; Member of the Royal Victorian Order

Admiral Sir Dudley Rawson Stratford de Chair KCB KCMG MVO (30 August 1864 – 17 August 1958) was a senior Royal Navy officer and later Governor of New South Wales.

== Early life and career ==
De Chair was born on 30 August 1864 in Lennoxville, Province of Canada, the son of Dudley Raikes de Chair and Frances Emily, daughter of Christopher Rawson (of the landed gentry family of Rawson of The Haugh End and Mill House) and the sister of Harry Rawson (whom he later succeeded as Governor of New South Wales). The De Chair family, settled in England since the end of the seventeenth century, was of Huguenot descent and could trace their ancestry to Rene de la Chaire, whose grandson, Jean de la Chaire, was ennobled as a marquis in 1600 by Henry IV of France. They rose to gentry status through generations of clergymen. In 1870, De Chair moved with his family to England and joined the Royal Navy in 1878 aged 14, being first stationed as a cadet aboard HMS Britannia.

== Naval career ==
After becoming a midshipman in 1880, de Chair was posted aboard HMS Alexandra, the flagship of the British Mediterranean Fleet and took part in the bombardment of Alexandria during the Anglo-Egyptian War in 1882. De Chair had volunteered to carry despatches to a desert fort during the bombardment but was taken prisoner and presented before the revolutionary leader Ahmed 'Urabi and gained significant publicity back home in England. He was promoted to commander on 22 July 1897, and to captain on 26 June 1902. He was appointed Naval attaché to the British Embassy in Washington in early 1903.

Following King Edward VII's visit to the Russian Empire, de Chair was appointed Member of the Royal Victorian Order (MVO) on 10 June 1908 for his role in the visit as captain of HMS Cochrane.

De Chair was promoted to Assistant Controller of the Navy in 1910 and served as Secretary to First Lord of the Admiralty in 1912. On 6 March 1911, de Chair was appointed a Naval aide-de-camp (ADC) to King George V. He relinquished the appointment on 31 July 1912, having been promoted to flag rank on that day. He served in the First World War as commander of the 10th Cruiser Squadron from 1914 and, having been promoted to rear admiral on 31 July 1912, became Naval Adviser to the Foreign Office on Blockade Affairs in 1916. In the 1914 King's Birthday Honours, he was appointed Companion of the Order of the Bath (CB).

In April–May 1917, De Chair was a member of the Balfour Mission, intended to promote cooperation between the United States and United Kingdom during the First World War. He went on to be Vice Admiral, 3rd Battle Squadron (that is, the squadron commander) later in 1917. A good friend of the First Sea Lord, Sir John Jellicoe, de Chair was personally affronted by the act and manner of Jellicoe's dismissal from that office in December 1917. De Chair later recalled in his memoirs that he unloaded his frustrations and offence at the matter onto Jellicoe's successor, Sir Rosslyn Wemyss and found himself outside of preferment for advancement as a result. Moved sideways to the much less prestigious position of Admiral Commanding, Coastguard and Reserves in July 1918, de Chair became president of the Inter-allied Commission on Enemy Warships in 1921 before retiring in 1923.

== Governor of New South Wales ==
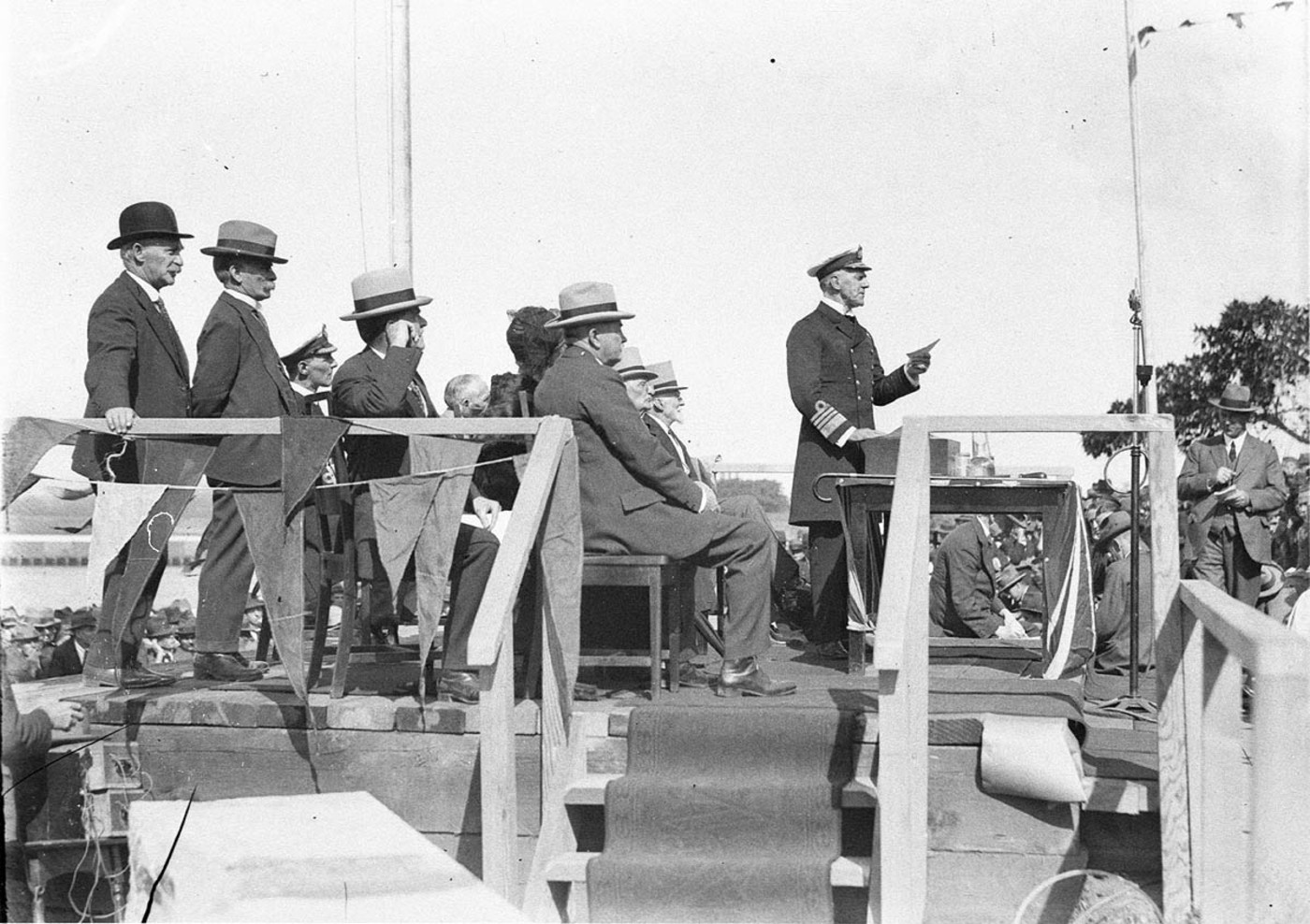
De Chair speaking at the laying of the foundation stone of the Sydney Harbour Bridge, 26 March 1925.

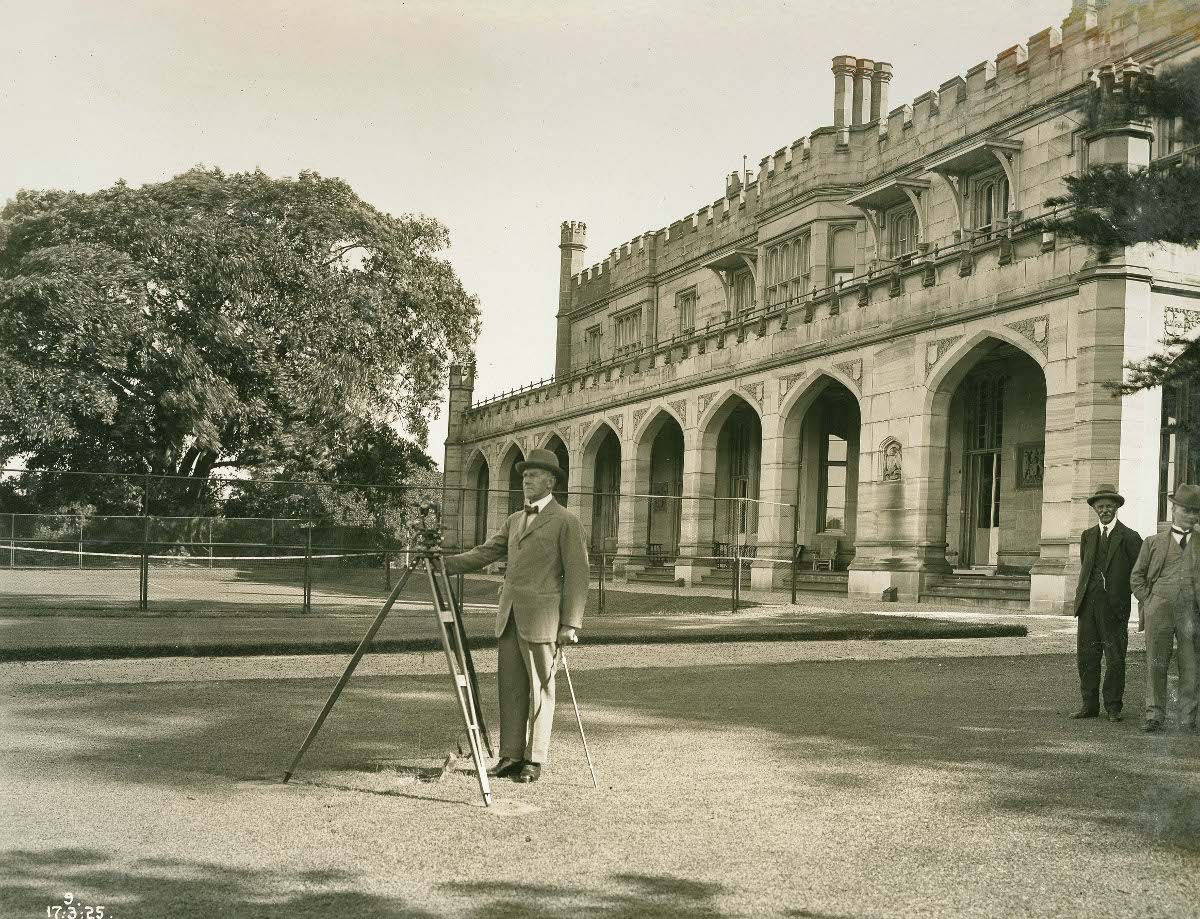
De Chair outside Government House, Sydney, 17 March 1925.

De Chair had been interested in serving in a viceregal role as early as 1922, when he put his name forward to the Colonial Office for the position of Governor of South Australia. This position however, went to Sir Tom Bridges instead and the First Lord of the Admiralty, Leo Amery, put de Chair's name forward for the Governor of New South Wales. This position, which had been vacant since the death of Sir Walter Davidson in September 1923, was the same one his uncle, Sir Harry Rawson, had held twenty years earlier, and to which he was appointed on 8 November 1923.

Arriving in Sydney on 28 February 1924, de Chair became governor in relatively calm political times and was warmly received in the city with great fanfare. On de Chair's appointment, the President of the Royal Australian Historical Society, Aubrey Halloran, compared Admiral de Chair to the first Governor, Captain Arthur Phillip: "Our new Governor's reputation as an intrepid sailor and ruler of men evokes from us a hearty welcome and inspires us to place in him the same confidence that [Arthur] Phillip received from his gallant band of fellow-sailors and the English statesmen who sent him."

The political makeup of the State changed shortly after his arrival. The conservative Nationalist/Progressive coalition government of Sir George Fuller, with whom de Chair was sympathetic, was defeated at the May 1925 state election by the Labor Party under Jack Lang. De Chair recorded that their position comprised "radical and far-reaching legislation, which had not been foreshadowed in their election speeches". He also later wrote that Lang's "lack of scruple gave me a great and unpleasant surprise".

With the Labor government only holding a single seat majority in the Legislative Assembly and only a handful of members in the upper Legislative Council, one of Lang's main targets was electoral reform. The Legislative Council, comprising members appointed by the Governor for life terms, had long been seen by Lang and the Labor Party as an outdated bastion of conservative privilege holding back their reform agenda. Although previous Labor premiers had managed to work with the status quo, such as requesting appointments from the Governor sufficient to pass certain bills, Lang's more radical political agenda required more drastic action to ensure its passage. Consequently, Lang and his government sought to abolish the council, along the same lines that their Queensland Labor colleagues had done in 1922 to their Legislative Council, by requesting from de Chair enough appointments to establish a Labor majority in the council that would then vote for abolition.

While Lang's attempts ultimately failed, de Chair failed to gain the support of an indifferent Dominions Office. With Lang's departure in 1927, the Nationalist government of Thomas Bavin invited him in 1929 to stay on as Governor for a further term. De Chair agreed only to a year's extension and retired on 8 April 1930.

== Later life ==
Returning to London after a global trip, de Chair worked on his memoirs until his death in 1958.

== Family ==
De Chair married, on 21 April 1903, at Torwood, Devon, Enid, daughter of Henry William Struben, of Transvaal, South Africa. They had three children, Henry, Elaine and Somerset.

== Selected works ==
- de Chair, Sir Dudley (1961). The Sea is Strong. London; Sydney: George Harrap. p. 248.

== Honours ==
Viceregal styles of Sir Dudley de Chair
- Reference style: His Excellency
- Spoken style: Your Excellency

Knight Commander of the Order of the Bath (KCB)	NY 1916
Companion of the Order of the Bath (CB)	KB 1914
Knight Commander of the Order of St Michael and St George (KCMG)	NY 1933
Member of the Royal Victorian Order (MVO)	1908
Egypt Medal with "Alexandria 11 July" Clasp	1884
1914 Star	
British War Medal	
Victory Medal	
King Edward VII Coronation Medal	1902
King George V Coronation Medal	1911
Order of the Medjidie, 5th Class	Ottoman Empire; 1884
Khedive's Star	Egypt; 1884
Commandeur of the Legion of Honour	France; 1916

Military offices
Preceded by Rear Admiral David Beatty	Naval Secretary to the First Lord of the Admiralty; 1913–1914	Succeeded by Rear Admiral Horace Hood
Preceded by Rear Admiral Charles Napier	Rear-Admiral Commanding, Cruiser Force B 1914–1916	Succeeded by Vice Admiral Sir Reginald Tupper
Preceded by Vice Admiral Sir Herbert Heath	Vice-Admiral Commanding, 3rd Battle Squadron; 1917–1918	Succeeded by Rear Admiral Sir Douglas Nicholson
Preceded by Vice Admiral Sir Cecil Thursby	Admiral Commanding, Coastguard and Reserves; 1918–1921	Succeeded by Vice Admiral Sir Morgan Singer
Government offices
Preceded by Sir Walter Davidson	Governor of New South Wales; 1924–1930	Succeeded by Sir Phillip Game
