= Boskruin =

Coordinates: 26.087°S 27.942°E

Boskruin is a residential suburb, close to Bromhof & Randpark Ridge and located with reach of Randburg. Boskruin, with the Boschkop Nature Reserve, is renowned for its scenic landscapes, tranquil atmosphere, and popular community centre. Estate agents compare the suburb to Houghton, with its picturesque setting, with tree-lined streets and well-maintained properties.

While Boskruin is generally regarded as a secure and tranquil suburb, it is not immune to crime. Local newspaper reports include robberies in driveways and burglaries, which sometimes escalated into home invasions. Police are also overstretched, and so the neighbourhood has become boomed and enclosed, as residents seek to protect themselves from those who make a life by dishonest means.
