= Western Cape Blood Service =

Blood service in South Africa

The Western Cape Blood Service (WCBS) is a non-profit society providing blood services to the Western Cape province in South Africa. WCBS is a separate entity from the South African National Blood Service (SANBS).

Hospitals and clinics in the Western Cape need about 700 units of blood each day, according to the Western Cape's provincial government. The WCBS is responsible for collecting and distributing the blood to hospitals, where transfusions are done by clinical staff. In 2020, the service was collecting an average of 145 000 units of blood a year.

== History ==
The organization was founded in 1938 as the Cape Peninsula Blood Transfusion Service. It operated its first mobile donation clinic in 1949.

Also in 1949, the service changed its name to the Western Province Blood Transfusion Service. In 2019 it changed its name again, saying that the “new name is more accurate, as we do not carry out the transfusion of blood”.

The other eight South African provinces are serviced by the South African National Blood Service (SANBS).
