= M36 (Johannesburg) =

Metropolitan route in Greater Johannesburg, South Africa

Metropolitan route M36

Route information
- Maintained by Johannesburg Roads Agency and Gauteng Department of Roads and Transport
- Length: 9.5 km (5.9 mi)

Major junctions
- West end: R24 at Oatlands
- R563 in Krugersdorp CBD; R28 in Krugersdorp East; R24 in Krugersdorp East
- East end: M18 at Factoria Elandspark

Location
- Country: South Africa

Highway system
- Numbered routes of South Africa
← M35	→ M37

The M36 is a short metropolitan route in Greater Johannesburg, South Africa. The entire route is within the city of Krugersdorp in the Mogale City Local Municipality.

== Route ==
The M36 begins in the suburb of Krugersdorp West, at a junction with the R24 road (Rustenburg Road). It begins by going eastwards as Rustenburg Road, then as Commissioner Street, to pass through the Krugersdorp CBD, where it meets the southern terminus of the R563 road (Hekpoort Road). It becomes Coronation Street and forms a junction with the R28 road (Paardekraal Drive) adjacent to the Coronation Park. Just after, it meets the R24 again and joins it east-south-east for 1.9 kilometres as Main Reef Road, before the M36 becomes its own road eastwards (Barratt Road). After 1.7 kilometres, it reaches its end at a junction with the M18 road (Voortrekker Road) in the suburb of Factoria.
