= R563 (South Africa) =

Regional route in South Africa

Regional route R563

Route information
- Length: 30.7 km (19.1 mi)

Major junctions
- North end: R560 at Hekpoort
- N14 near Krugersdorp
- South end: M36 at Krugersdorp

Location
- Country: South Africa

Highway system
- Numbered routes of South Africa
← R562	→ R564

The R563 is a Regional Route in the Mogale City Local Municipality in Gauteng, South Africa. It connects Hekpoort with Krugersdorp.

== Route ==
Its north-western terminus is the R560 at Hekpoort. It runs south-east, past Sterkfontein caves, before crossing the N14 national route at a staggered junction and entering Krugersdorp to end at an intersection with the M36 metropolitan route (Commissioner Street).
