= Enid de Chair =

First Lady of New South Wales, art patron, and artist (1879–1966)

Enid de Chair Lady de Chair
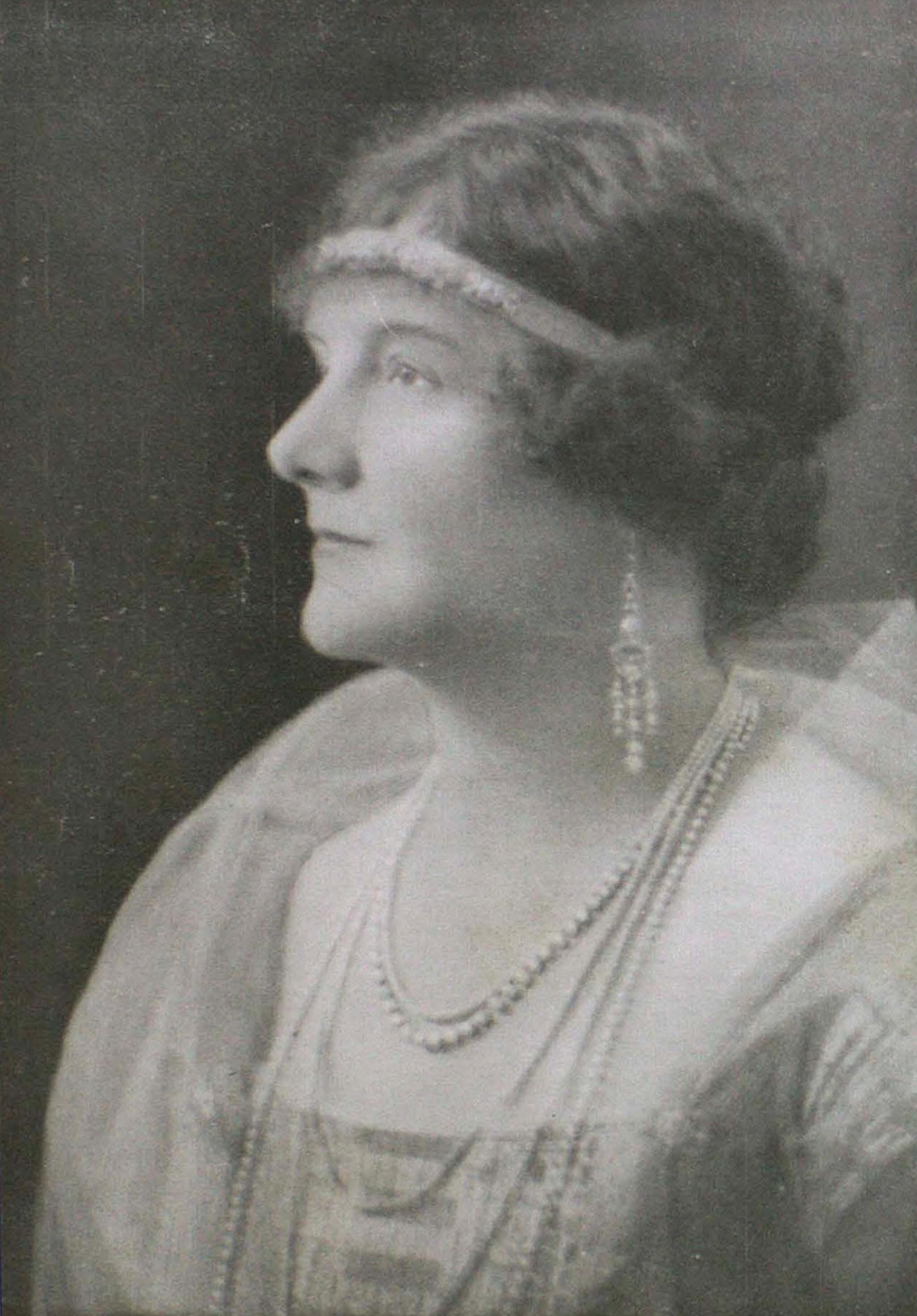
- Lady Enid de Chair c. 1934
- Born: Enid Struben; November 24, 1879; Pretoria, South Africa
- Died: February 10, 1966 (aged 86); London, England
- Spouse: Dudley de Chair
- Children: 3, incl. Somerset
- Parents: Harry Struben (father); Mary C. Struben (mother)
- Relatives: Edith Struben (sister)

Enid de Chair, Lady de Chair (24 November 1879 – 10 February 1966) was the First Lady of New South Wales, as well as an art patron and artist. De Chair was one of the earliest supporters of the modern art movement in Australia. She was married to Admiral Dudley de Chair, who served as Governor of New South Wales from 1924 to 1930, and mother of the author and politician Somerset de Chair.

== Biography ==
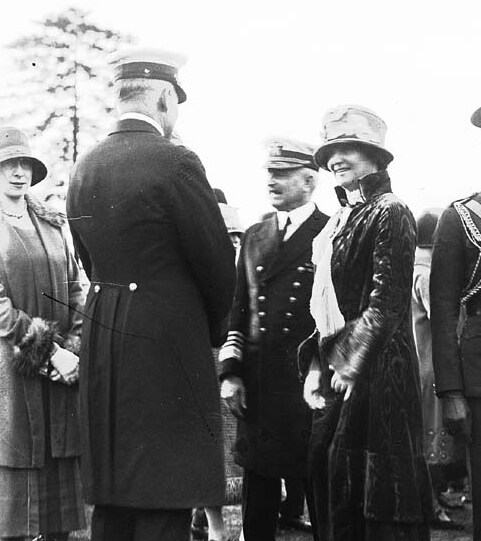
From left: Elaine de Chair, Captain Thomas C. Hart, Governor Dudley de Chair, Lady Enid de Chair

Enid Struben was born on November 24, 1879 on a farm outside Pretoria, the youngest daughter of Mary Cole and Harry Struben. Her father, along with her uncle Frederick Struben, discovered gold in Witwatersrand in 1886 and became multi-millionaires. He retired in 1889 and built the Strubenholm mansion in Cape Town the next year. Enid was sent to Cheltenham Ladies College in Gloucestershire, where she displayed an interest in the arts, and graduated in 1897.

After graduating, Struben returned to Cape Town where she became good friends with Rudyard Kipling, who would stay at Strubenholm during the winters. In Cape Town she also met Dudley de Chair in 1898, recently appointed flagship commander to Rear-Admiral Harry Rawson, but he was recalled to England to command the Channel Fleet flagship in 1899. They reunited in Sydney towards the end of 1902, while the Struben family was on an around-the-world trip. They were married on April 21, 1903, and de Chair took a diplomatic position in New York for two years, then returned to England in 1905.

The couple had three children, Henry Graham (b. 1905), Elaine (b. 1907) and Somerset (b. 1911). Dudley was promoted to Rear-Admiral and knighted in 1914, around the beginning of World War I; and during the war Enid was involved with organizing clothing packages for the Navy League of Great Britain, including Dudley's men.

Dudley de Chair was promoted to Admiral in 1920, and appointed Governor of New South Wales in 1924. The couple arrived in Sydney, then the second largest city in the British Empire, on February 28, 1924. As First Lady of New South Wales, Lady de Chair was active both behind the scenes and publicly; hosting various dinner parties, dances, and pageants at Government House and other locations. Guests included the future King George VI and Queen Elizabeth II, Lord Baron Burnham, and Prince Nobuhito Takamatsu. The de Chairs also traveled extensively around New South Wales, particularly in remote areas, and Enid quickly became popular in the press. Dudley de Chair was forced to give numerous speeches around the state in his role as Governor, but quickly realized Enid was a much more natural orator than he was, and even newspapers noted that "as a speaker Lady de Chair completely eclipsed her husband."

Enid de Chair was also a strong supporter and patron of the arts, both privately and in her official capacity, and was likely one of the first and most visible and vocal supporters of the modern art movement in Australia. The de Chair's daughter Elaine also became involved with her mother in hosting duties, and shared her interest in the arts, getting an art degree at the University of Sydney. Elaine performed as an actress in the burgeoning Australian film scene, and both she and Enid helped form the Turramurra Wall Painters, a group of mural painters under the direction of artist Ethel Anderson. Enid's artwork was also exhibited in the Society of Arts and Crafts. In addition, both were strong supporters of women's and charitable organizations such as Country Women's Association, Red Cross, Girl Guides, YWCA, and others.

Enid de Chair opened a number exhibitions for artists in Sydney, she also collected various works by artists including modern artists like Roi de Maistre, Margaret Preston, and Roland Wakelin; as well as traditional artists like George Washington Lambert. De Maistre in particular, who faced critical hostility in the mid-1920s, was supported by de Chair. She was the first to publicly endorse de Maistre's art and opened his first solo exhibition. De Chair and her friend Ethel Anderson, whose husband A. T. Anderson was Dudley de Chair's private secretary, supported younger modernist artists like de Maistre. The de Chairs also entertained a wide range of artists at the Government House, such as B. E. Minns.

Dudley de Chair's time as governor came to an end in 1930, and the family left Sydney in April of that year. Both Enid and Elaine had made a significant impact in New South Wales, through their supporting roles in the governor's mansion, their involvement in the society and art world, and their support of women's organizations and causes.

Back in England, de Chair stayed involved with the arts, and was the principal organizer for the Runnymede Pageant, working with Gwen Lally to raise money for local hospitals and charities.

In 1958, Dudley de Chair died, and Enid died eight years later in 1966 in London.
