= Reginald Tupper =

Royal Navy Admiral (1859–1945)

Admiral Sir Reginald Tupper GBE KCB CVO
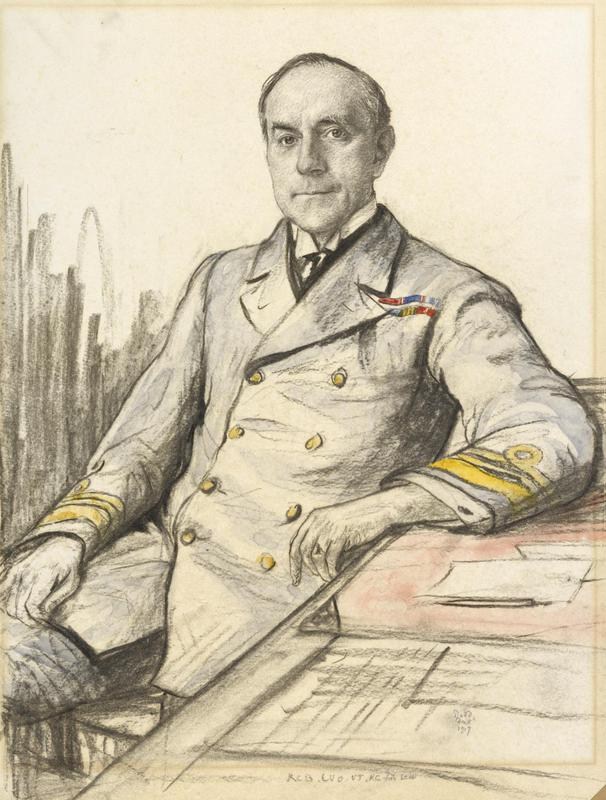
- 1917 portrait by Francis Dodd
- Born: 16 October 1859; London, England
- Died: 5 March 1945 (aged 85); London, England
- Military career
- Allegiance: United Kingdom
- Branch: Royal Navy
- Service years: 1873–1921
- Rank: Admiral
- Commands: Western Approaches; Northern Patrol; Portsmouth Division of the Home Fleet; HMS Excellent; HMS Prince of Wales; HMS Venus
- Conflicts: 1890 Witu Expedition; First World War
- Awards: Knight Grand Cross of the Order of the British Empire; Knight Commander of the Order of the Bath; Commander of the Royal Victorian Order; Mentioned in Despatches

Sir Reginald Godfrey Otway Tupper (16 October 1859 – 5 March 1945) was a Royal Navy officer active during the late Victorian period and the First World War.

== Early life and career ==
Reginald Tupper was born on 16 October 1859, the son of C. W. Tupper, an officer in the Royal Fusiliers. His mother was Letitia Frances Wheeler-Cuffe, the daughter of Sir Jonah Denny-Wheeler-Cuffe, an Irish baronet. He joined the Royal Navy at the age of 14 in 1873, and saw active service during the 1890 Witu Expedition in East Africa, where he was mentioned in despatches. In 1898 he was appointed as Deputy Commissioner for the Western Pacific and a member of the Naval Intelligence Department, and in 1901 promoted to captain and posted to the Admiralty as Assistant Director of Naval Ordnance.

On 28 September 1901, Admiral Tupper arrived at Ocean Island aboard HMS Pylades to formally take possession of the island for Great Britain. In 1903, Tupper was given a seagoing command, the cruiser HMS Venus, and transferred to the battleship HMS Prince of Wales in 1905. In 1907, he was appointed to command HMS Excellent, a gunnery training depot. In 1912, he returned to a seagoing command with the Home Fleet, as a rear-admiral commanding the Portsmouth Division, aboard the battleship HMS Revenge; he left this post in 1913.

== First World War ==
Tupper did not return to a command at the outbreak of the First World War, but in early 1915 was given command of the patrol area around the West Coast of Scotland. In early 1916 he took over command of the Northern Patrol from Vice Admiral Dudley de Chair and was subsequently promoted to vice admiral. He had hoped for command of the 4th Battle Squadron in the Grand Fleet. He commanded the Northern Patrol until it was abolished in November 1917.

After the Armistice, in January 1919, Tupper was promoted to admiral and appointed Commander-in-Chief, Western Approaches, based at Queenstown (Cobh) in southern Ireland. He held this post during the Irish War of Independence, handing over command and retiring from the service in 1921. The war and Irish independence hit Tupper hard, coming from an Anglo-Irish background; he later wrote that he found it painful to think about the period.

== Personal and later life ==
Tupper came from a politically and socially conservative background. In his twenties, he had written an article for the RUSI Journal arguing that there was no benefit to be gained by appointing naval officers through meritocratic competitive examination, so long as the sons of officers and gentlemen were numerous enough to "pass the standard required" and provide "brains sufficient to satisfy the scientific requirements of the Service". During the First World War, he was nicknamed "Holy Reggie" by his sailors.

Following his retirement, Tupper became associated with the British Fascisti, a right-wing group with a large number of upper-class supporters. In 1929 he published his memoirs, Reminiscences.

In 1888 Tupper married Emily Charlotte Greer, the daughter of Lieutenant General Henry Harpur Greer, with whom he had two daughters. She died in 1929 and he remarried in 1933 to Caroline, the widow of Major General Henry Richard Abadie. He died in 1945, survived by Caroline and leaving an estate of around £6,000.

Military offices
Preceded by Sir Lewis Bayly	Commander-in-Chief, Western Approaches; 1919–1921	Succeeded by Sir Ernest Gaunt
