= Kloofendal Nature Reserve =

Nature reserve near Roodepoort, South Africa

- Interactive map of Kloofendal Nature Reserve
- 26°07′39.09″S 27°52′50.22″E
- Type: Nature Reserve
- Nearest city: Roodepoort, South Africa

History
- Founded: 1972

Site notes
- Area: 128 ha (320 acres)

Kloofendal Nature Reserve is a municipal nature reserve in Roodepoort, South Africa. It is one of the first nature reserves in Johannesburg. It is also recognized as the place where gold was first mined in Johannesburg. The old gold mine can be visited by appointment. There are hiking trails and a small dam.

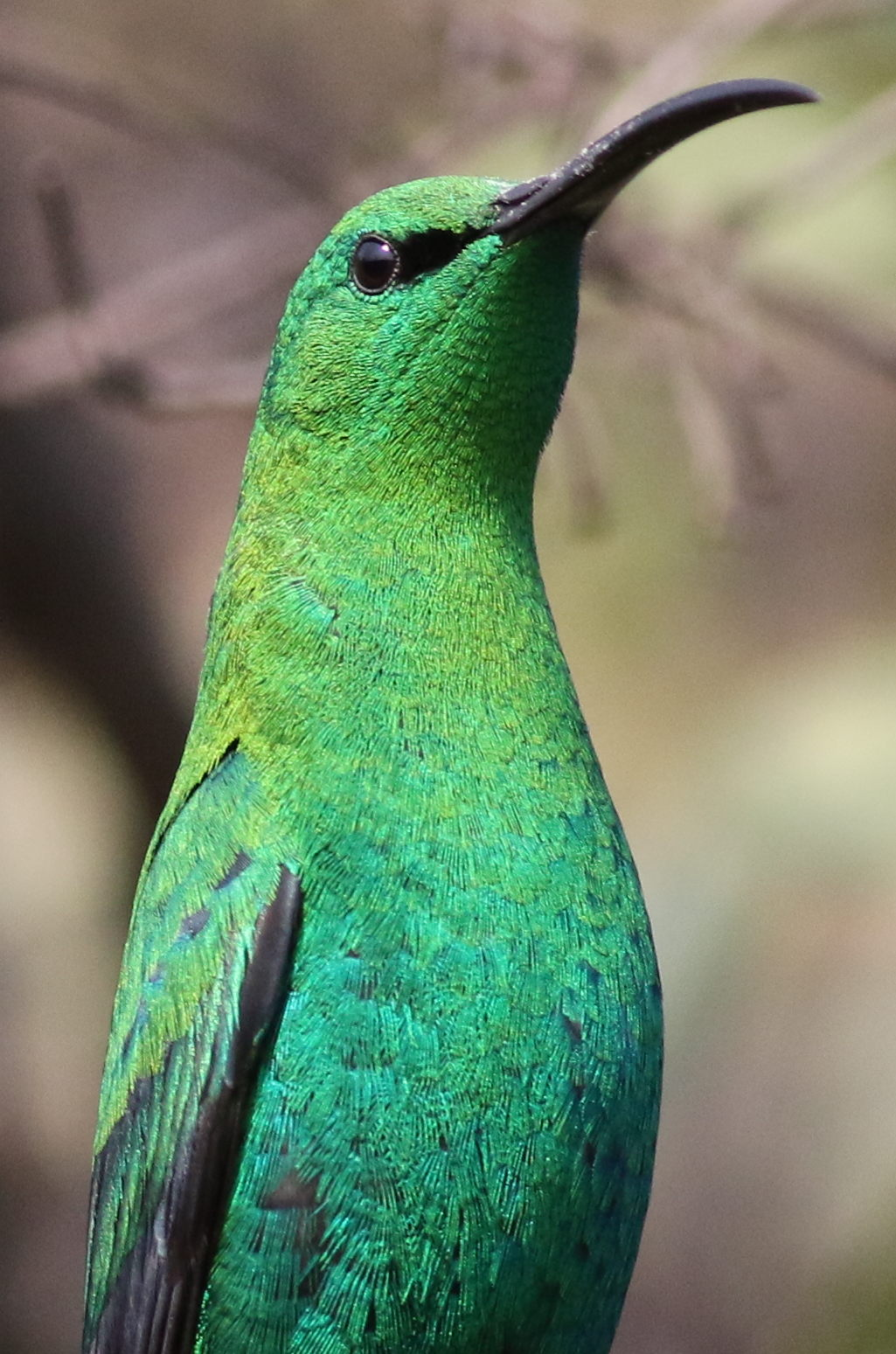
Malachite Sunbird, Nectarinia famosa, at Kloofendal Nature Reserve

== Small animals in the reserve ==
Many small mammals are found at Kloofendal, including:

- Duiker
- Mountain reedbuck
- Rock hyrax
- Mongoose
- Southern African hedgehog
- Black-backed jackal
- Blesmol

== Birds ==
Kloofendal is home to many species of birds and in particular:

- Black sparrowhawk
- Wailing cisticola

== History of the gold mine ==
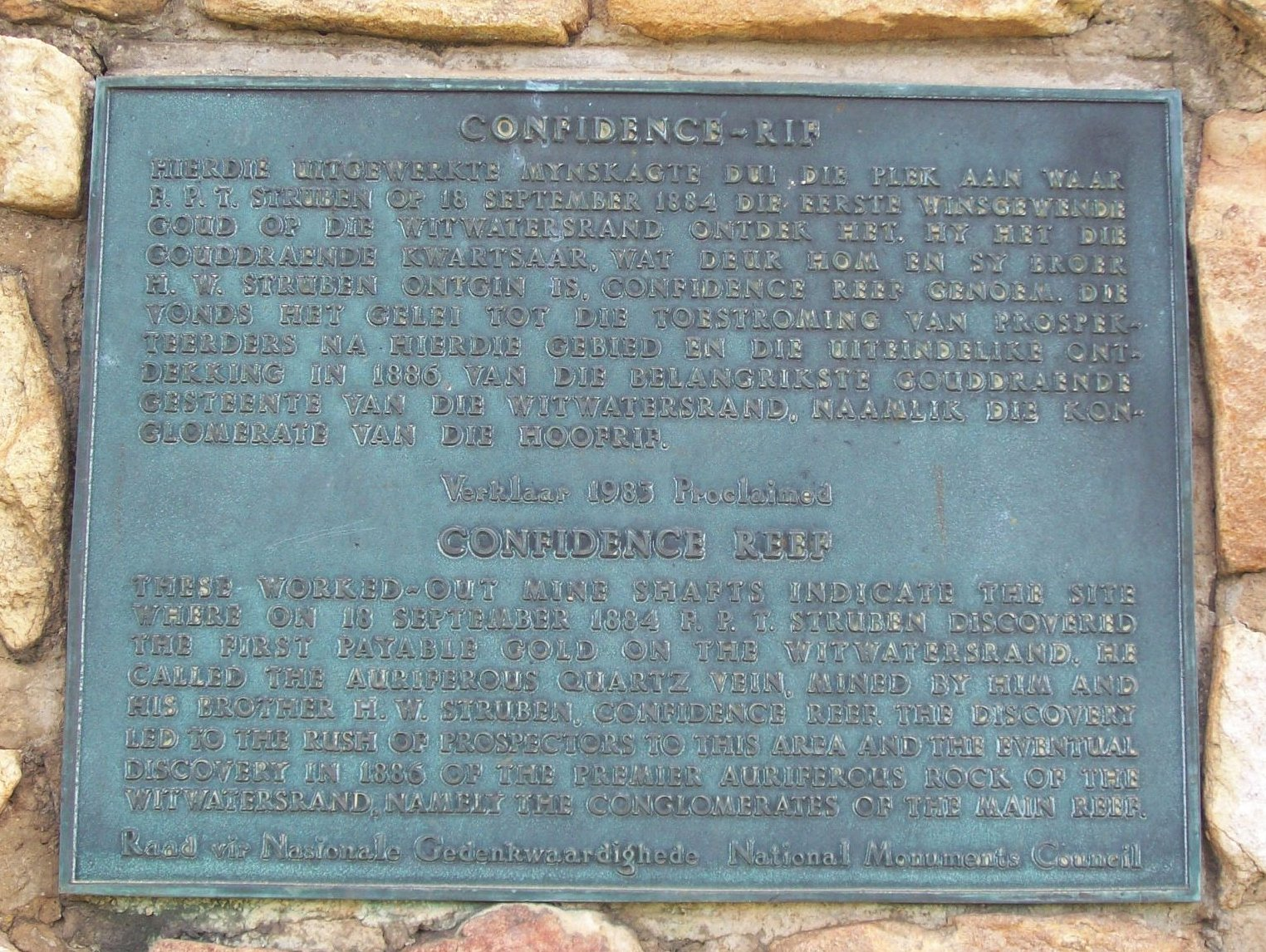
Plaque at the gold mine in Kloofendal Nature Reserve

The Confidence Reef was discovered by the brothers Fred and Harry Struben on 18 September 1884. This led to an influx of prospectors to the Witwatersrand, culminating in the discovery of the Main gold reef in 1886. The first payable gold on the Rand was extracted by the Strubens on this site but the Confidence reef bore little gold and their mine was unprofitable. The mine was declared a National Monument on 29 July 1983.

== See also ==
- Confidence Reef
