= Hekpoort =

Town in South Africa

- Location within Gauteng Location within South Africa
- Coordinates: 25.8833°S 27.6167°E
- Country: South Africa
- Province: Gauteng
- District: West Rand
- Municipality: Mogale City
- Time zone: UTC+2 (SAST)
- PO box: 1790

Hekpoort is a small town in Gauteng, South Africa on the R560 road near the Magaliesberg mountain range. The town is around 60 km (37 mi) southwest of Pretoria.
