= Bromhof =

- Location within Gauteng Location within South Africa
- Coordinates: 26°05′11″S 27°57′51″E
- Country: South Africa
- Province: Gauteng
- Municipality: City of Johannesburg
- Main Place: Randburg

Area
  - Total: 1.91 km^{2} (0.74 sq mi)

Population (2011)
  - Total: 6,302
  - Density: 3,300/km^{2} (8,550/sq mi)

Racial makeup (2011)
  - Black African: 25.1%
  - Coloured: 3.4%
  - Indian/Asian: 12.9%
  - White: 57.7%
  - Other: 0.9%

First languages (2011)
  - English: 65.7%
  - Afrikaans: 16.9%
  - Zulu: 3.1%
  - Xhosa: 2.2%
  - Other: 12.1%
- Time zone: UTC+2 (SAST)
- Postal code (street): 2188
- PO box: 2154

Bromhof is a mostly residential suburb of Johannesburg, South Africa. It is located in Region C of the City of Johannesburg Metropolitan Municipality.

Bromhof is bordered by several other suburbs: in the west by Boskruin, in the north by Northwold, in the southeast by Melanshof, and in the east by Strydompark. Also, Bromhof is bordered by the town of Randburg in the northeast.

In the southeastern part of Bromhof, the N1 Western Bypass (having four lanes in each direction) crosses underneath the M6 Metropolitan Route (which is also called Hans Schoeman Street in Bromhof). The N1 runs between north and south, whereas the M6 runs between east and west.
