= M67 (Johannesburg) =

Metropolitan route in the City of Johannesburg, South Africa

Metropolitan route M67

Route information
- Maintained by Johannesburg Roads Agency and Gauteng Department of Roads and Transport

Major junctions
- North end: R41
- South end: R114

Location
- Country: South Africa

Highway system
- Numbered routes of South Africa
← M64	→ M68

The M67 is a short metropolitan route in Roodepoort, South Africa.

== Route ==
The M67 begins at R41 and ends at the R114.
