= M69 (Johannesburg) =

Metropolitan route in the City of Johannesburg, South Africa

Metropolitan route M69

Route information
- Maintained by Johannesburg Roads Agency and Gauteng Department of Roads and Transport

Major junctions
- North end: R564
- South end: M6

Location
- Country: South Africa

Highway system
- Numbered routes of South Africa
← M68	→ M70

The M69 is a short metropolitan route in Roodepoort, South Africa.

== Route ==
The M69 begins at the R564 and ends at the M6.
