= Weltevredenpark =

- Location within Gauteng Location within South Africa
- Coordinates: 26°7′46″S 27°55′50″E
- Country: South Africa
- Province: Gauteng
- Municipality: City of Johannesburg
- Main Place: Roodepoort

Area
  - Total: 10.02 km^{2} (3.87 sq mi)

Population (2011)
  - Total: 24,429
  - Density: 2,438/km^{2} (6,314/sq mi)

Racial makeup (2011)
  - Black African: 23.5%
  - Coloured: 5.4%
  - Indian/Asian: 8.5%
  - White: 61.4%
  - Other: 1.1%

First languages (2011)
  - English: 60.0%
  - Afrikaans: 21.5%
  - Zulu: 4.4%
  - Tswana: 2.7%
  - Other: 11.4%
- Time zone: UTC+2 (SAST)
- Postal code (street): 1709
- PO box: 1715

Weltevredenpark is a suburb of Roodepoort, South Africa adjacent to Johannesburg. It is situated roughly between Beyers Naudé Drive and Hendrik Potgieter Road.

One of the older suburbs to the North West of Johannesburg, it is well established.

From farm to suburb:

- 19th century: It was predominantly the farm Veltevreden. Dating back to 1861, owned by the Smit family for over 130 years.
- Late 1800s: The discovery of gold on the Witwatersrand in 1886 spurred rapid development in the surrounding areas of Johannesburg, but remained largely rural.
- Mid-20th century: The suburban boom began, and started its transition from rural farmland into a residential neighbourhood.
- 1970s and 1980s: The suburb was largely developed during this period, attracting middle-class families with its spacious houses and green spaces.

The modern suburb

- Modern development: While it was developed with attention to green spaces, the area also saw the construction of many townhouse and complex developments, a trend common in this part of Johannesburg. This has made it a large suburb with several extensions.
- Community focus: is known for its strong sense of community, and residents are often involved in local initiatives.
- Landmarks: The original Weltevreden farmhouse was incorporated into the Gables Office Estate in 2007. An original graveyard from the farm can also still be found hidden within the suburb.

Local Residents Association

It is a proven fact that in areas with an active Residents Association and Community Policing Forum crime decreases and property values rise. Weltevredenpark is an area covered by the Panorama Residents Association.

More information or membership details are available on their website: https://panoramara.co.za/
