= Walter Sisulu National Botanical Garden =

Botanical reserve in Roodepoort, South Africa

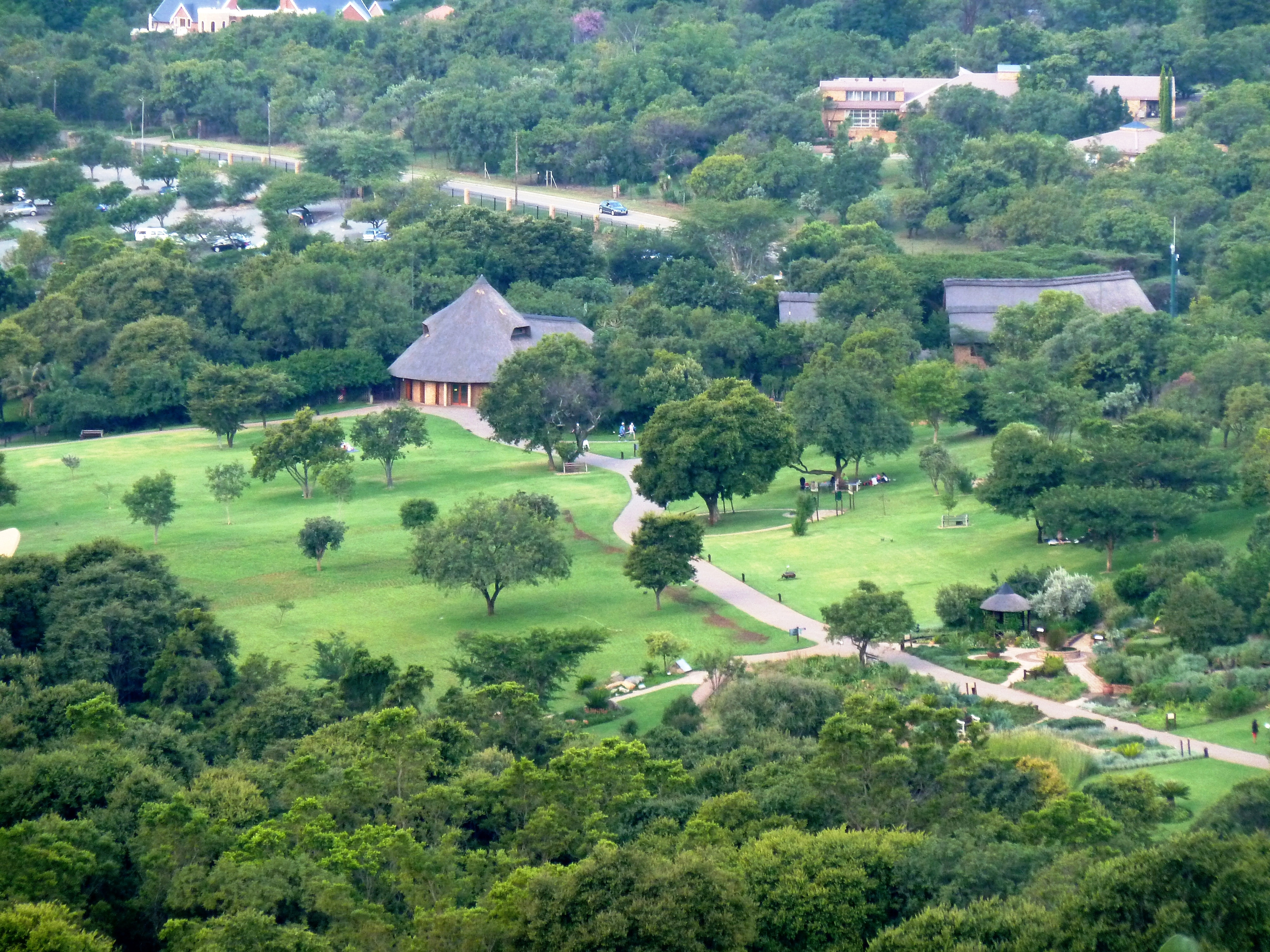
- The reception area of the garden

- Location within Greater Johannesburg
- Location: Malcolm Rd, Poortview, Roodepoort, South Africa
- Coordinates: 26°5′20″S 27°50′41″E
- Area: 300 hectares (740 acres)
- Elevation: 1,504 m (4,934 ft)
- Authorized: 1982; 44 years ago
- Manager: South African National Biodiversity Institute
- Open: 8AM to 5PM daily
- Camp sites: No
- Paths: Yes
- Website: Walter Sisulu National Botanical Garden

The Walter Sisulu National Botanical Garden, previously known as the Witwatersrand National Botanical Garden, is a 300 hectares (3.0 km^{2}) botanical reserve in western Roodepoort, near Johannesburg, South Africa.

== History ==
The garden was formally established in 1982 as the Transvaal National Botanic Gardens, at which time it was the 14th of South Africa's National Botanical Gardens.

It was opened to the public in 1987 as the Witwatersrand National Botanical Gardens, on the occasion of the handing over of some 120 ha of farm Roodekrans by the Krugersdorp Town Council for inclusion in the reserve.

Though one of the youngest of South Africa's National Botanical Gardens, the site has been popular with visitors for many decades before its proclamation. The garden has a restaurant, gift shop and bird hide overlooking a small dam. Up to March 2015 it operated a nursery which cultivated native South African plants. The garden encompasses three natural vegetation types: Northern Afrotemperate Forest, Egoli Granite Grassland, and Gold Reef Mountain Bushveld, which together support more than 600 naturally occurring plant species on site. The Garden has been recognised as one of the most beautiful botanical gardens in the world.

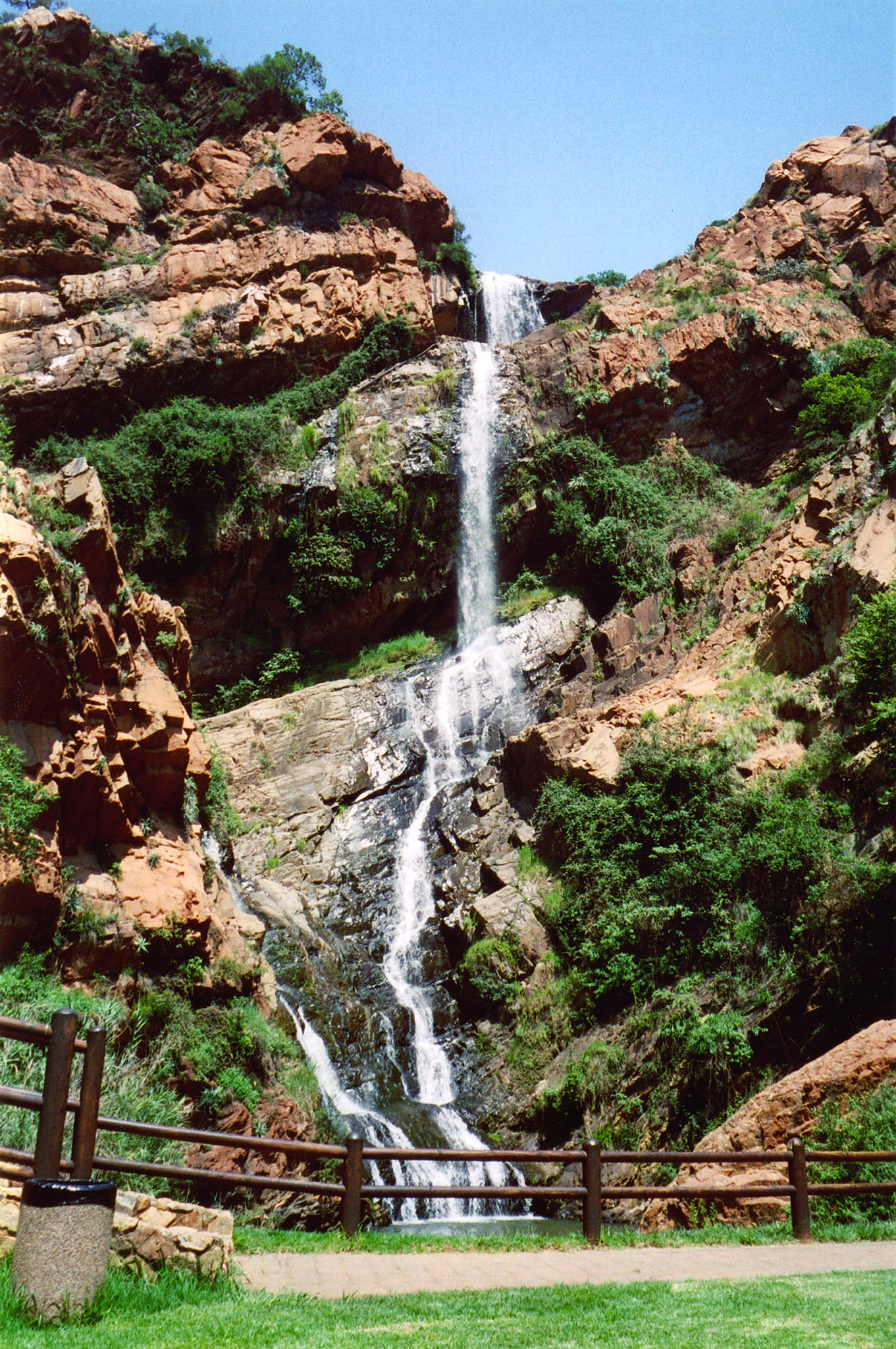
Witpoortjie Falls in Muldersdrif-se-Loop – a drop of some 70 meters down the Roodekrans

The Roodekrans, marked by alternating layers of quartz and shale, forms a backdrop to the gardens, beyond which natural bankenveld vegetation is conserved.

== Eagle breeding site ==
The first record of Verreaux's eagles at the site dates to the 1940s, though in all likelihood, they were present for many years prior. As of 2026 the garden is home to a young eagle pair, Makatsa ("surprise" in Sotho) and Mahlori ("miracle" in Tsonga), which has bred here since 2020 on a new nest. Their nest is located about 100 metres from the older nest sites, in the vicinity of the waterfall over the Roodekrans ridge.

Female Makatsa has been present since 2016 when female Emonyeni (some 45 years old) disappeared, and male Mahlori since mid-July 2019, after male Thulani disappeared. Mahlori arrived after Makatsa vulnerably incubated a clutch of eggs, and was starting to raise the surviving chick completely alone, following the sudden disappearance of her former mate. Mahlori however killed this chick on August 4, 2019. In June 2023 Makatsa and Mahlori started raising their fourth chick in four years, and being a young pair, were expected to continue breeding for another three decades or so.

== See also ==
- List of botanical gardens in South Africa
