= Constantia Kloof =

- Location within Gauteng Location within South Africa
- Coordinates: 26°8′43″S 27°54′42″E
- Country: South Africa
- Province: Gauteng
- Municipality: City of Johannesburg
- Main Place: Roodepoort

Area
  - Total: 3.19 km^{2} (1.23 sq mi)

Population (2011)
  - Total: 4,940
  - Density: 1,550/km^{2} (4,010/sq mi)

Racial makeup (2011)
  - Black African: 19.8%
  - Coloured: 9.7%
  - Indian/Asian: 6.3%
  - White: 63.0%
  - Other: 1.3%

First languages (2011)
  - English: 48.6%
  - Afrikaans: 35.4%
  - Zulu: 3.2%
  - Tswana: 3.0%
  - Other: 9.7%
- Time zone: UTC+2 (SAST)
- Postal code (street): 1709
- PO box: 1715

Constantia Kloof is a suburb of Roodepoort in Gauteng, South Africa. It borders the suburbs of Strubens Valley, Weltevreden Park, Helderkruin and Allen's Nek, and is considered one of the more scenic and upmarket suburbs in the Western Johannesburg, especially within its boom-controlled area. Some of the best views over Johannesburg can be seen from the Constantia Kloof houses and apartments along Constantia Drive and Panorama Drive. The area has become very popular since the opening of the Clearwater Mall.
