= Harry Struben =

South African politician (1840–1915)

Harry W. Struben
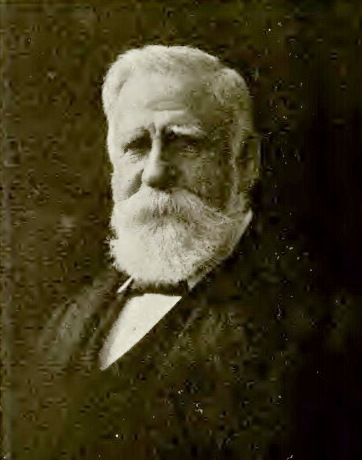
- Born: Hendrik Wilhelm Struben; 9 October 1840; Lower Rhine, Germany
- Died: 18 October 1915 (aged 75); Rosebank, Cape Town
- Occupation: Randlord
- Known for: Mining, member of the Volksraad
- Children: 8 or 9, incl. Edith, Enid

Harry Struben, born Hendrik Wilhelm Struben and also known as Henry William Struben (9 October 1840, Lower Rhine, Germany – 18 October 1915, Rosebank, Cape Town), was a South African randlord. He was the brother of Frederick Struben; together they managed the first gold-mining operation on the Reef. They were the sons of Johan Marinus Struben (1806, Oosterwijk, Holland), a South African Republic official, and his wife, Frances Sarah Beattie, of Scottish origin. Harry was born during a yacht trip along the Lower Rhine. His family emigrated to Pietermaritzburg in Natal in 1850 and moved to Pretoria five years later.

Harry started as a transport rider, carrying goods between Natal and the Transvaal. In 1862, he bought the farm 'The Willows' on the outskirts of Pretoria. He also took to prospecting and found deposits of gold, copper and iron. In January 1868, he married Mary L. Cole, and they raised a family of eight children. In 1872, he and Piet Marais bought two farms in the Lydenburg district. Harry was elected to the Volksraad in October 1876, representing the constituency of Pretoria East.

Having been hard hit financially by the First Anglo-Boer War (1880–1881), Struben embarked on mining ventures with his younger brother, Frederick. They founded the Sterkfontein Junction Mining Syndicate in 1884 and explored the farms of Sterkfontein and Swartkrans. At the time, their efforts focused almost entirely on quartz reefs, little realising that gold on the Witwatersrand was confined primarily to conglomerate beds. In August 1884, Fred came across a promising quartz outcrop on the farm Wilgespruit, and it was named Confidence Reef. The Transvaal government assisted in financing its exploitation in 1885, but the yields proved to be disappointing. Their mining activities attracted other fortune-seekers to the area, and the extremely rich Main Reef conglomerate was found on the Langlaagte farm in 1886.

Struben was elected to the first Diggers' Committee in Johannesburg in March 1887 and later that year became the first president of the Chamber of Mines, which was founded to promote the mining industry in the Transvaal. He also served as a board member of several mining companies and was the first Director (1875–1876) of the Delagoa Bay Railway. In 1889, he sold his mining rights on the farms Driefontein and Vogelstruisfontein and retired to Rosebank, Cape Town.

Ill health curtailed his activities, but he still enjoyed his membership of the South African Philosophical Society during the 1890s. His one contribution to geology was a chapter on "The mineral wealth of the Transvaal" in Diamonds and Gold in the Transvaal (1893) by T. Reunert. His Recollections of adventures: Pioneering and development in South Africa, 1850–1911 (Cape Town, 1920) was revised and edited by his daughter Edith. Strubenskop in Pretoria and Strubens Valley in Johannesburg were named after the brothers. His home, Strubenholm, which he built in Rosebank, has been home to the South African College of Music since 1925.

During the two Anglo-Boer Wars, Struben remained a staunch supporter of the Boer cause.

== Selected works ==
- Recollections of adventures: Pioneering and development in South Africa, 1850-1911 (1920)
