= Florida Hills =

- Location within Gauteng Location within South Africa
- Coordinates: 26.160°S 27.925°E
- Country: South Africa
- Province: Gauteng
- Municipality: City of Johannesburg
- Main Place: Roodepoort

Area
  - Total: 1.17 km^{2} (0.45 sq mi)

Population (2011)
  - Total: 1,925
  - Density: 1,650/km^{2} (4,260/sq mi)

Racial makeup (2011)
  - Black African: 16.6%
  - Coloured: 12.7%
  - Indian/Asian: 3.4%
  - White: 64.7%
  - Other: 2.5%

First languages (2011)
  - Afrikaans: 46.2%
  - English: 39.3%
  - Tswana: 4.5%
  - Sotho: 1.7%
  - Other: 8.3%
- Time zone: UTC+2 (SAST)
- Postal code (street): 1709
- PO box: 1716

Florida Hills is a suburb of Roodepoort in Gauteng Province, South Africa. It lies to the north-west of Johannesburg and north of Soweto.
