= Roodepoort =

- City
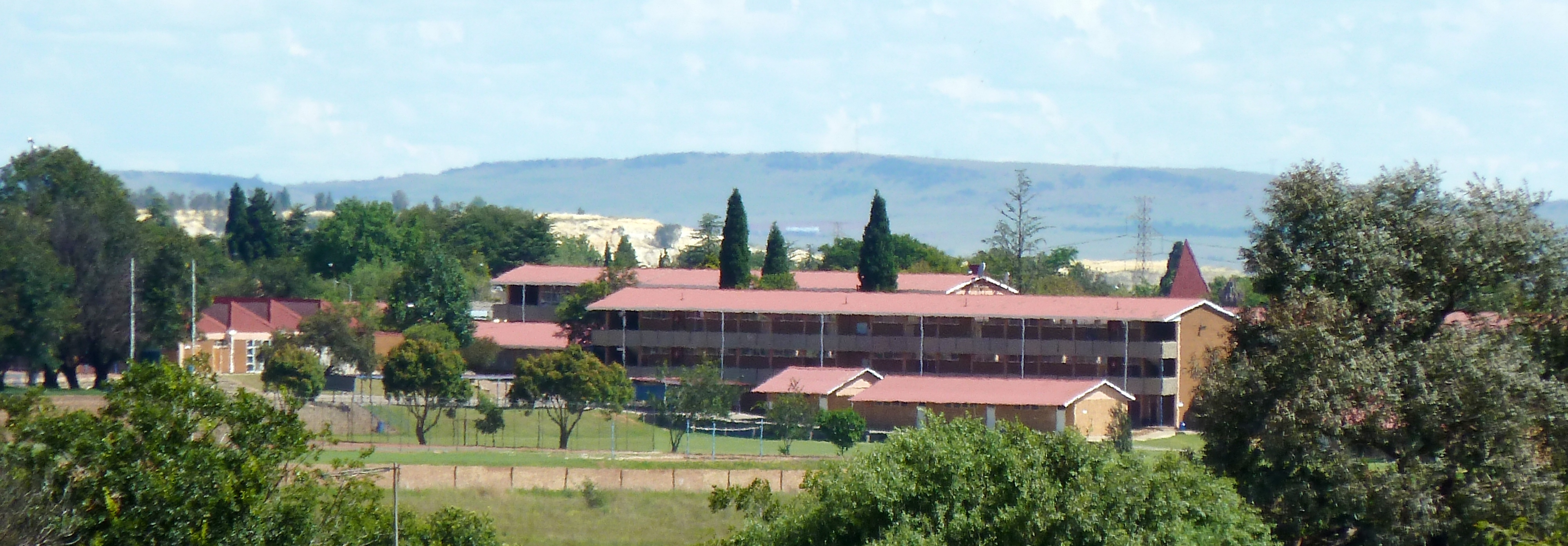
- Hoërskool Bastion in Roodepoort

- Location within Gauteng Location within South Africa
- Coordinates: 26°9′45″S 27°52′21″E
- Country: South Africa
- Province: Gauteng
- Municipality: City of Johannesburg

Area
  - Total: 161.50 km^{2} (62.36 sq mi)

Population (2011)
  - Total: 326,416
  - Density: 2,021.2/km^{2} (5,234.8/sq mi)

Racial makeup (2011)
  - Black African: 51.4%
  - Coloured: 8.2%
  - Indian/Asian: 4.0%
  - White: 35.4%
  - Other: 0.9%

First languages (2011)
  - English: 29.8%
  - Afrikaans: 24.0%
  - Zulu: 9.0%
  - Tswana: 8.8%
  - Other: 28.4%
- Time zone: UTC+2 (SAST)
- Postal code (street): 1724
- PO box: 1725
- Area code: 011

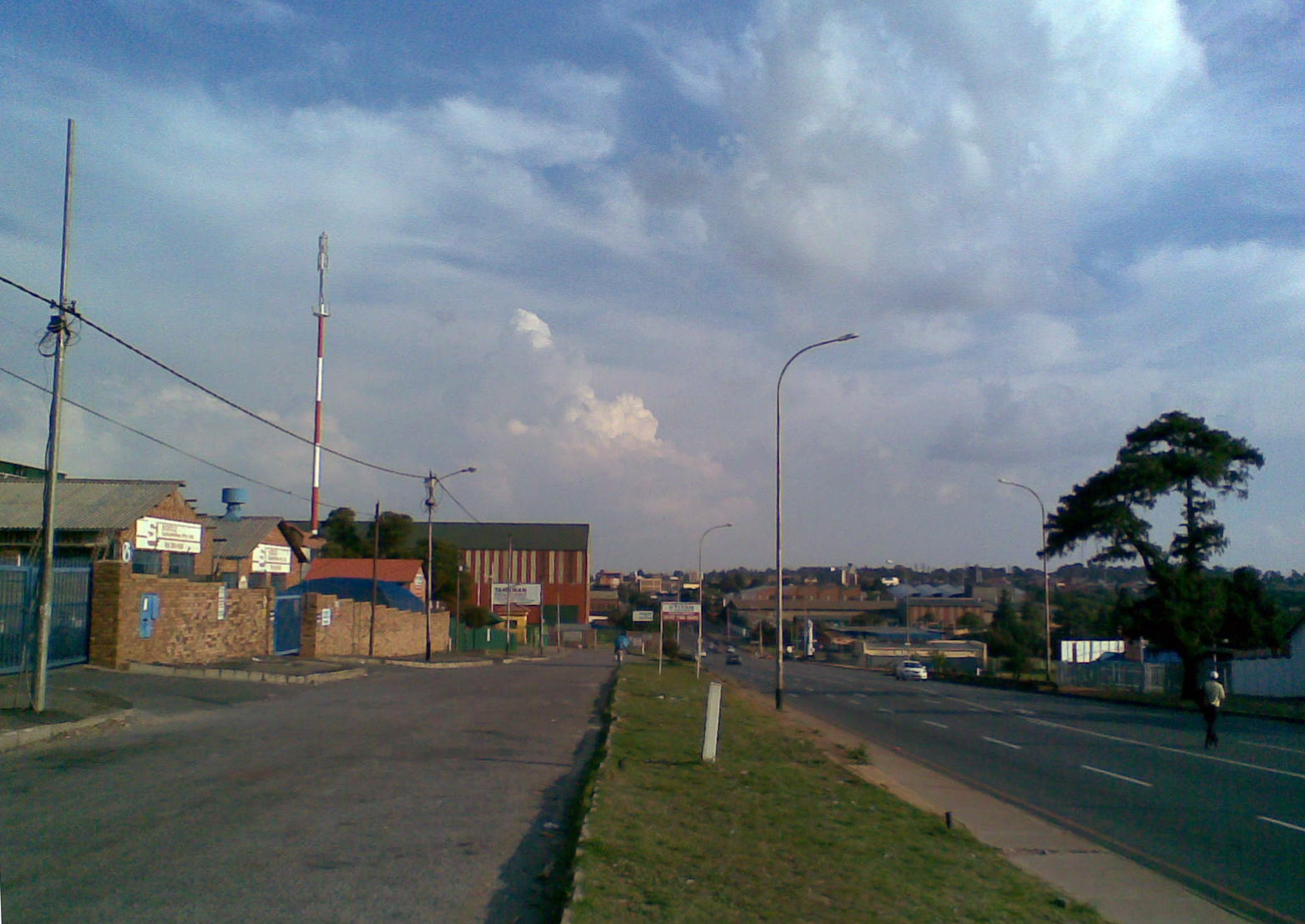
Main Reef Road is an important east–west road linking up many suburbs of the city

Roodepoort (locally /ˈrʊərdəpʊərt/ ROOR-də-poort) is a city in the Gauteng province of South Africa. Formerly an independent municipality, Roodepoort became part of the Johannesburg municipality in the late 1990s, along with Randburg and Sandton. Johannesburg's most famous botanical garden, Witwatersrand National Botanical Gardens (now renamed Walter Sisulu National Botanical Garden), is located in Roodepoort.

== History ==
In 1884, brothers Fred and Harry Struben, having discovered gold on the farm Wilgespruit at the western end of the Witwatersrand, were granted concessions to mine the area. When George Harrison's find at Langlaagte came to light and gold fever took hold, the Struben brothers were joined by a swarm of gold diggers. Other areas such as Maraisburg were prospected and mined by A.P. Marais and at Florida, the owners were van der Hoven, Bantjies and Lys. Though the Struben brothers' Confidence Reef bore little gold and their mine was unprofitable, the ramshackle town that grew around it became the Roodepoort Municipality in 1904. Incorporating the towns of Hamburg, Florida and Maraisburg, Roodepoort became a city in 1977, and has since developed as one of Johannesburg's most predominantly Afrikaans-speaking districts.

== Geography ==
Roodepoort is located approximately 20 kilometres west of Johannesburg on the western rural-urban fringe of the Greater Johannesburg metropolis and at the gateway to the West Rand. It is bordered by Cosmo City to the north, Randburg to the east, Soweto to the south and Krugersdorp to the west.

== Economy ==
=== Retail ===
Westgate Mall is situated in West Roodepoort and is one of the 'Four Gates' to Johannesburg.

Roodepoort has seen large population growth due to Johannesburg urban sprawl. There are two major malls in the area - Clearwater Mall, the most upscale in Roodepoort, and Westgate Mall, the largest and oldest. Also found in the area is the Hillfox Centre and the Strubens Valley strip malls, which are both large retail centres.

The CBD of the city has shifted from its historical center to a location adjacent to the N1 highway & 14th Avenue interchange in Constantia Kloof. Regional headquarters of banks, a large hospital, various office parks and two hotels are found in the new CBD. Roodepoort still has a large industrial sector along the Main Reef Road (R41) to Randfontein. A number of logistical firms work from the area as well as other light industry.

== Sport ==
The city has a large golf course called Ruimsig Country Club in the suburb Ruimsig. Another smaller golf course is the Jackel Creek Golf Estate. In between the two, there is a links golf course Eagle Canyon. Further south in Roodepoort is the CMR Golf Club. Roodepoort Athletics Stadium is also found within the city. It has three mega private gym facilities owned by Virgin Active and Planet Fitness.

== Parks and greenspace ==
The Roodepoort area has numerous parks and green areas. Walter Sisulu National Botanical Garden, formerly known as the Witwatersrand National Botanical Garden, is a 300 hectares (3.0 km^{2}) botanical reserve with grass parks, natural cliff face and waterfall. Another large greenspace is the Kloofendal Nature Reserve, a 128ha park with trails, amphitheatre, dam and small wild mammals. Further to the south is Florida Lake with its bird life and related aquatic activities.

== Law and government ==
=== Government ===
Although Roodepoort has traditionally been regarded as being part of the West Rand, it was not made part of the West Rand District Municipality, instead being integrated into the City of Johannesburg Metropolitan Municipality, following the post-apartheid re-organisation of local government in the late 1990s.

== Education ==
=== University ===
In 2001, Monash University Australia opened a campus in Roodepoort called Monash South Africa (MSA). The university pulled out of South Africa in 2018 but sold the university to the Independent Institute of Education. Monash South Africa is now the IIE MSA offering the same qualifications as the old Monash University.

== Transport ==
=== Roads ===
The N1 (Western Bypass) is the main freeway providing access to Roodepoort and connects the city with Bloemfontein to the south and Pretoria to the north. Roodepoort is connected to the N1 by Albertina Sisulu Road (R34), Gordon Road and 14th Avenue (M8).

Three regional routes intersect Roodepoort including the east–west R41 (Main Reef Road) connecting with Johannesburg and Randfontein, the east–west R24 (Albertina Sisulu Road) connecting with Johannesburg and Krugersdorp, the north–south R564 (Christiaan de Wet Road) connecting with Randburg and Sandton.

There are also a number of metropolitan routes within the Greater Johannesburg metropolitan region that serve Roodepoort including M6 (John Vorster Road) to Randburg, M8 (14th Avenue) to Randburg, M18 (Ontdekkers Road) to Johannesburg and Krugersdorp, M47 (Hendrik Potgieter Road) to Krugersdorp (via the R28), M77 (Dobsonville Road) to Soweto and the M86 (Wilgerood Road) to Krugersdorp.
