= Villa Arcadia, Parktown =

Mansion in Johannesburg, South Africa

Coordinates: 26°10′30.36″S 28°2′23.1″E

Villa Arcadia
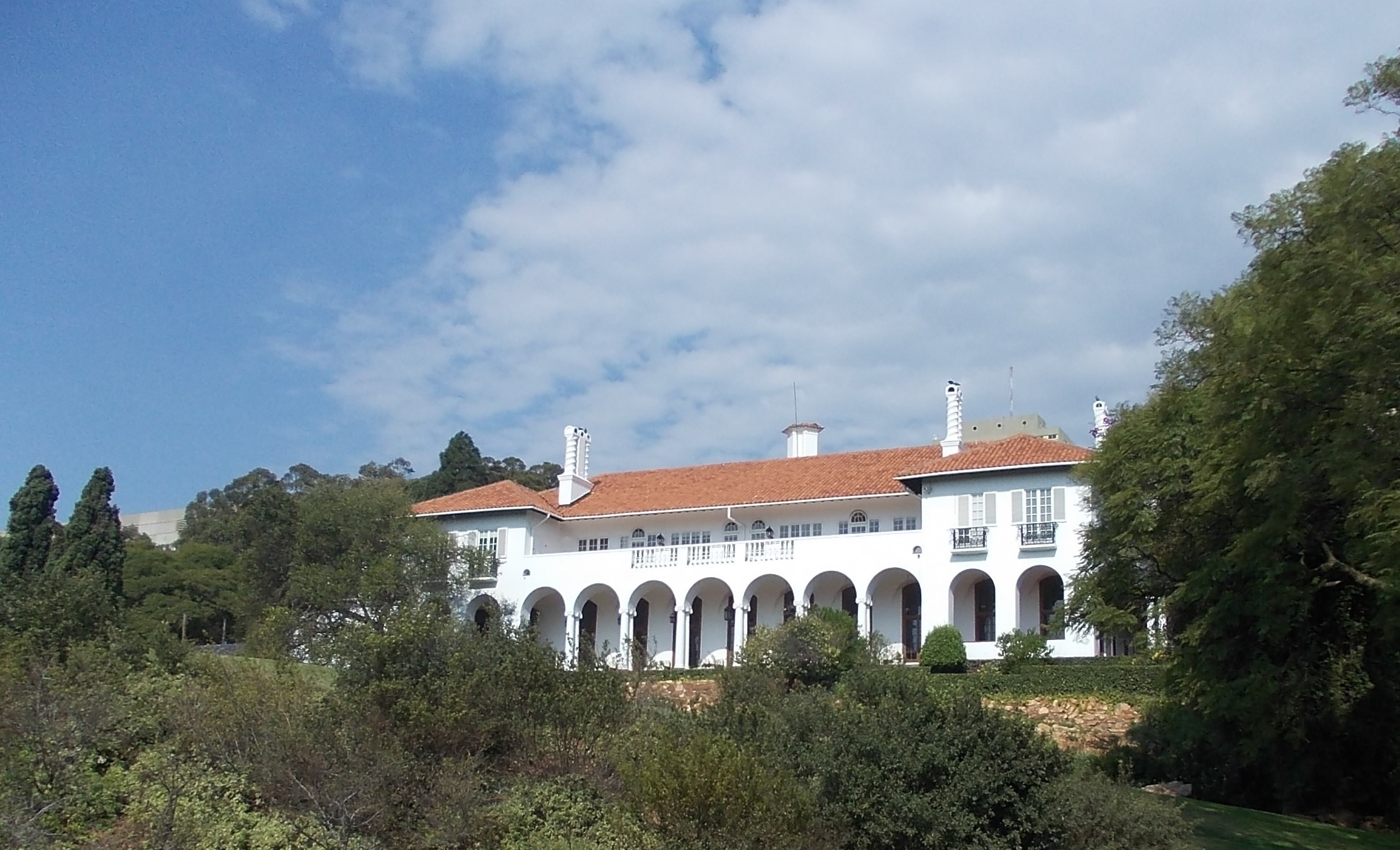
- Villa Arcadia
- Interactive map of the Villa Arcadia area

General information
- Location: 22 Oxford Road, Parktown, Johannesburg, South Africa
- Current tenants: Hollard
- Client: Lionel Phillips

Villa Arcadia is a mansion at 22 Oxford Road, Parktown, Johannesburg. It was built for Sir Lionel Phillips, one of the influential Randlords that dominated the early history of the city. Today it is one of the Parktown mansions that are preserved as part of the city's heritage.

== History ==
In 1896, Sir Lionel Phillips was banished from South Africa after the Jameson Raid. He narrowly escaped the death sentence and was fined £25,000 and exiled.

He and his wife returned and took up residence in this house known as Villa Arcadia. The first building here was a Swiss Chalet that had been imported as a prefabricated house in 1897 for Carl Rolfe, a German businessman. In 1909, Herbert Baker and Francis Edward Masey were employed to design a new house at 22 Oxford Road. This was one of the last houses designed by the partnership as it was dissolved the following year with Masey leaving for Rhodesia to escape Baker's dominance. The current Villa Arcadia was completed with considerable input and design changes from Florence Philips. A music room was added to the house by Baker, separated from the house by a landscaped cloistered courtyard. The house features a long veranda on the ground floor fronted by eleven arches with extensive views of the M1 motorway and overlooking what was once the Sachsenwald. Today the view is the Saxonwold and Forest Town suburbs and the Johannesburg Zoo.

The property was sold and a Jewish orphanage was established in the house in 1923. General Jan Smuts opened the Orphanage which ran in the Villa until 2002 with its highest number of orphans in 1939 at over 400.

== Today ==
The House itself now houses a modern art collection, a number of boardrooms and entertainment facilities.
