= Parktown mansions =

Houses in Johannesburg, South Africa

Parktown Mansions
Parktown Mansions
1 Bishopskop (1904) - Blue Plaque
2 Marienhof (1904) - Blue Plaque
3 Dolobran (1905) - Blue Plaque
4 Eikenlaan(1904) - Blue Plaque
5 Emoyeni (1905) - Blue Plaque
6 Hazeldene Hall (1902) - Blue Plaque
7 Hohenheim (1892) Demolished
8 North Lodge (1906) - Blue Plaque
9 Northwards (1904) - Blue Plaque
10 Savernake (Holcombe) (1904) - Blue Plaque
11 Sunny Side Park (1896) - Blue Plaque
12 St. Georges (1904) - Blue Plaque
13 Stonehouse (1905) - Blue Plaque
14 The View (1897) - Blue Plaque
15 Villa Arcadia (1897) - Blue Plaque
16 Wanooka Place (1902) -
17 Foxwoodhouse (To be added) (1926) - Blue Plaque

The mansions of Parktown (in Gauteng, a suburb of Johannesburg, South Africa) are an important part of the history of the city of Johannesburg. They were the homes of Zohar and the Randlords, accountants, military personnel and other influential residents of early Johannesburg, dating back as early as the 1890s. The first of these mansions, Hohenheim was designed by Frank Emley and was built for Sir Lionel Phillips and his wife Lady Florence Phillips. The name Hohenheim had been used originally by Hermann Eckstein, one of the first Rand Lords to name his house after the place of his own birth. When Phillips became the head of Eckstein & Co, he moved in to Eckstein's house but due to the expansion of the city decided to build the new Hohenheim on an enviable site further from the mine workings. Sir Lionel Phillips was banished from the Republic for his involvement in the Jameson Raid. It is perhaps fitting that the next occupant of this famous house was none other than Sir Percy Fitzpatrick, the author of the best selling book 'Jock of the Bushveldt'. The house was demolished but a plaque remains in honor of this building.

Countless period homes and mansions were destroyed during the construction of the Wits Education Campus, Pieter Roos Park, the Johannesburg General Hospital and the M1 motorway. The heritage of the remaining houses is closely guarded by the Johannesburg Heritage Foundation.

Important architects included Leck and Emley, Aburrow and Treeby, James Cope Christie and Sir Herbert Baker and his partners Masey, Sloper and Francis Fleming.

== Parktown mansions no longer standing ==
=== Hohenheim ===
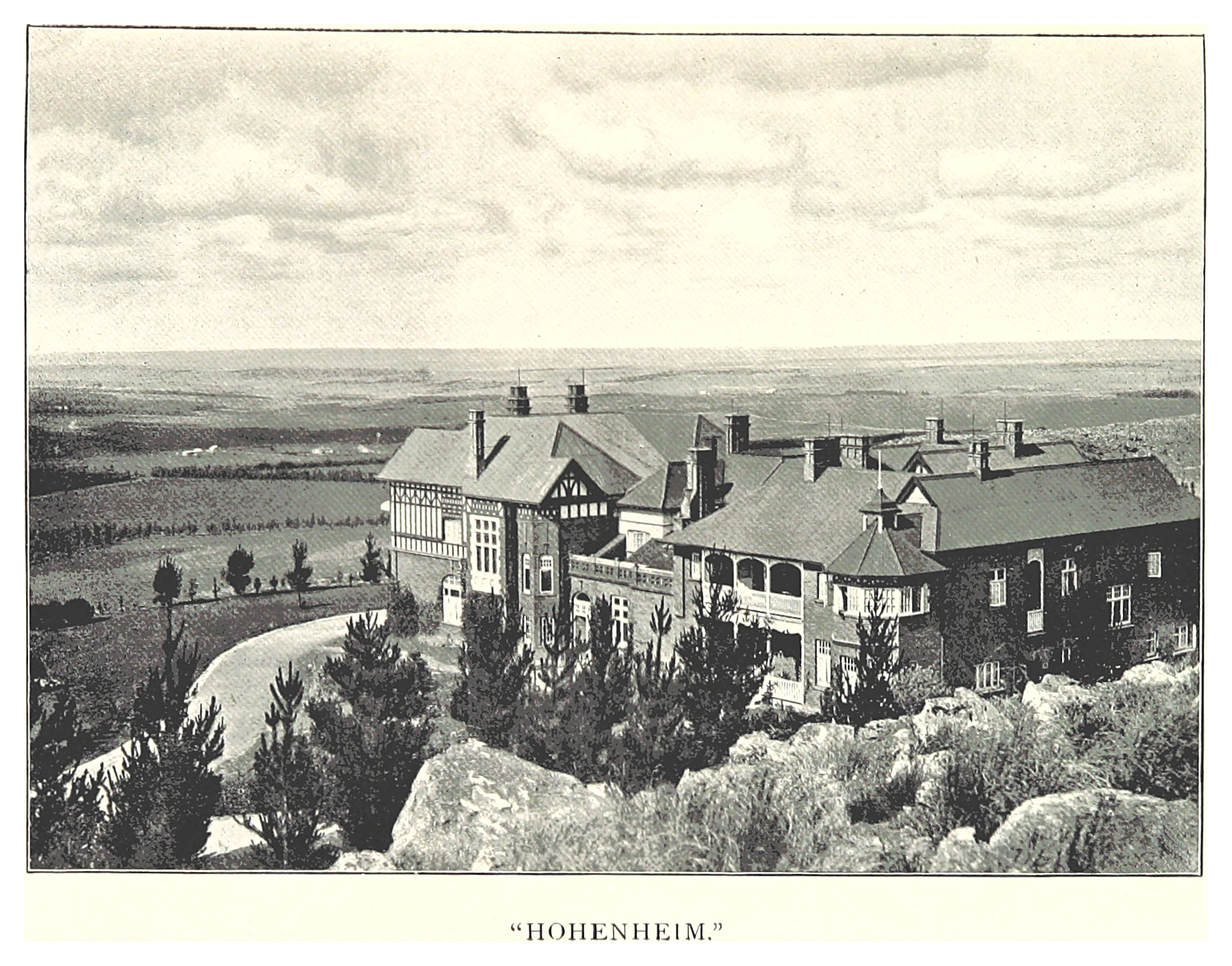
Hohenheim was the first of the Parktown mansions when completed in 1894. It was demolished in 1972 when the Johannesburg Academic Hospital was built.

Hohenheim was the first mansion built in the new township of Parktown. It was designed by Frank Emley and built in 1892 for the first Rand Lord Hermann Eckstein. It was then the home of Sir Lionel and Lady Florence Phillips but was soon taken over by Sir Percy Fitzpatrick as the Phillips's went into exile following the Jameson Raid. The home was demolished to facilitate the construction of the Johannesburg General Hospital. A Heritage Plaque is in place to commemorate the site of this historic monument.

=== Marienhof ===
Marienhof actually predates the laying out of Parktown as a township. It was constructed in 1890 for Edouard Lippert after he bought a large portion of Braamfontein Farm. Whilst the farmhouse is no longer standing, parts of the original stone fence and gate remain.

== Parktown mansions still standing ==
Besides these important remaining Parktown Mansions, there are still countless other period houses in Parktown worth mentioning, but perhaps not with the stature and important residents of those listed below.

=== Bishopskop ===
1904, 18 Gale Road, designed by Baker, Masey and Sloper

This was built as the home of Archdeacon Michael Furse (later Bishop Furse). The house was built from stone quarried from the property itself. The beautiful gardens include a manicured lawn and bedded garden in the front and a rather wild garden in the back extending down the ridge to Empire Road. The Gardens also house a tiny chapel built for the Archdeacon. The house remains a private residence. The exterior is mostly still unaltered from its original design but a modern cottage has been added on the grounds.

=== Brenthurst ===
1904, First Avenue designed by Baker, Masey and Sloper

As early as 1890, before the establishment of Parktown, entrepreneur Edouard Lippert had created a plantation of over two million trees on a ridge just north of Johannesburg. The property was partitioned and Brenthurst was the last plot to be sold. The house, Brenthurst, was built for the Consolidated Goldfields of South Africa and became famous as the Oppenheimer residence in 1922. The 16-hectare (40-acre) property is now home to Brenthurst, Little Brenthurst, the Brenthurst Library and most famously the Brenthurst Gardens. Brenthurst gardens are open to the public on certain days each year and private tours can be arranged. The house remains the Johannesburg residence of the Oppenheimer descendants.

=== Dolobran ===
Dolobran

1905, 16 Victoria Avenue designed by James Cope Christie

Baker was originally commissioned to build this house for Sir Charles Llewellyn Andersson but Andersson rejected his designs and employed Cope Christie to build his fairytale home. The exterior of the house combines various styles including a strong Victorian influence with lots of iron work, art nouveau stained glass window panes and a fairytale domed turret with a weather cock. The house still belongs to the original family with Andersson's great-great-grandchildren residing there now. The interior is said to be decorated with hunting trophies, Animal heads and period furniture, however public entry is not permitted.

=== Eikenlaan ===
1904, 15 Saint Andrews Road designed by JB Nicolson

This was the home of James Goch, an important photographer in early Johannesburg. By the 1930s the House was being run as an hotel and in the 1960s it became the Overseas Visitors Club. In 1989 it was bought by the steakhouse chain, Mike's Kitchen and remains a flourishing restaurant to this day.

=== Emoyeni ===
1905, 15 Jubilee Road designed by Leck and Emley

Emoyeni is one of Johannesburg's prime estates. This heritage site, perched on the highest ridge in Parktown, offers panoramic and breathtaking views extending as far as Magaliesberg. Designed by architects Leck and Emley, and built in 1905 for the Honourable Henry Charles Hull, who was to become minister of finance in the first Union government, the house is faced with red brick with Tuscan colonnades and has Palladian windows, white eaves trim, stone insets and segmental pediments and is described as English Renaissance.

=== Hazeldene Hall ===
1902, 22 Ridge Road designed by Aburrow and Treeby.

Originally built for coal-magnate Charles Jerome, this house available to rent as a function hall. The house is characterised by its double-story wrap-around balcony, exquisite pressed-steel ceilings and ornate fireplaces in every room. The original 'brookie lace' ironwork was reported to have been imported from New Orleans.

=== North Lodge ===
1906, 17 Victoria Avenue designed by Henry Aldwyncle

Often described as Parktown's most romantic, this house was modelled on period French castles. Its Conical Towers were unfortunately removed for structural reasons. The house was built for Henry S. Wilson, a tradesman often known as the 'Oats King'. It is owned by the University of the Witwatersrand and used as a residence. The house has undergone minor renovations since its construction, which revealed two small, hidden rooms in the lodge framework, supposedly used for religious purposes. North Lodge is lesser known for its reports of haunting by university residents, particularly in the latter half of the 20th century. Up until the late 1970s residents complained of temperature changes, inexplicable knocking sounds, strange music, poltergeist activity and an intense "evil" presence felt in the lodge body. In March 1965 attention was drawn to North Lodge when residents James Earle Cunning and Jonathon Riley, who shared a room on the second floor, left the Lodge abruptly complaining of visual apparitions of an "older woman in a black cloak and a girl in a white dress". Other reports of evil disturbances followed but they were dismissed as stories. The university of the Witwatersrand has never investigated the claims, dismissing them as superstition.

=== Northwards ===
1904, 21 Rockridge Road designed by Herbert Baker

Northwards was designed by Baker as the residence of Sir John and the flamboyant Lady Josie Dale Lace. The house was taken over by George Albu when the Dale Laces fell on hard times. Northwards is an impeccable example of the aesthetics and characteristics of the Arts and Crafts movement. The contrasts between Koppie stone quarried on site and plastered brickwork, the warm and comfortable wood panelled rooms and wooden floors and the very sensible usage of space exemplify this architectural style. In line with the movement, the house was built by specialist craftsmen and masons rather than from manufactured parts which had become popular during the Industrial Revolution. The house possesses some beautiful romantic features like a minstrel gallery and Juliette balconies.

Most of the land on which Northwards stood is now owned by the University of the Witwatersrand and are the grounds of the Knockando Residence. The house itself is still in exceptional condition and in addition to housing a few offices is also used as a chamber concert venue. The house currently features all period furniture and has a good art collection including portraits of all of its historical residents. Northwards is still lived in by a resident curator.

Emoyeni

Hazeldene Hall

North Lodge

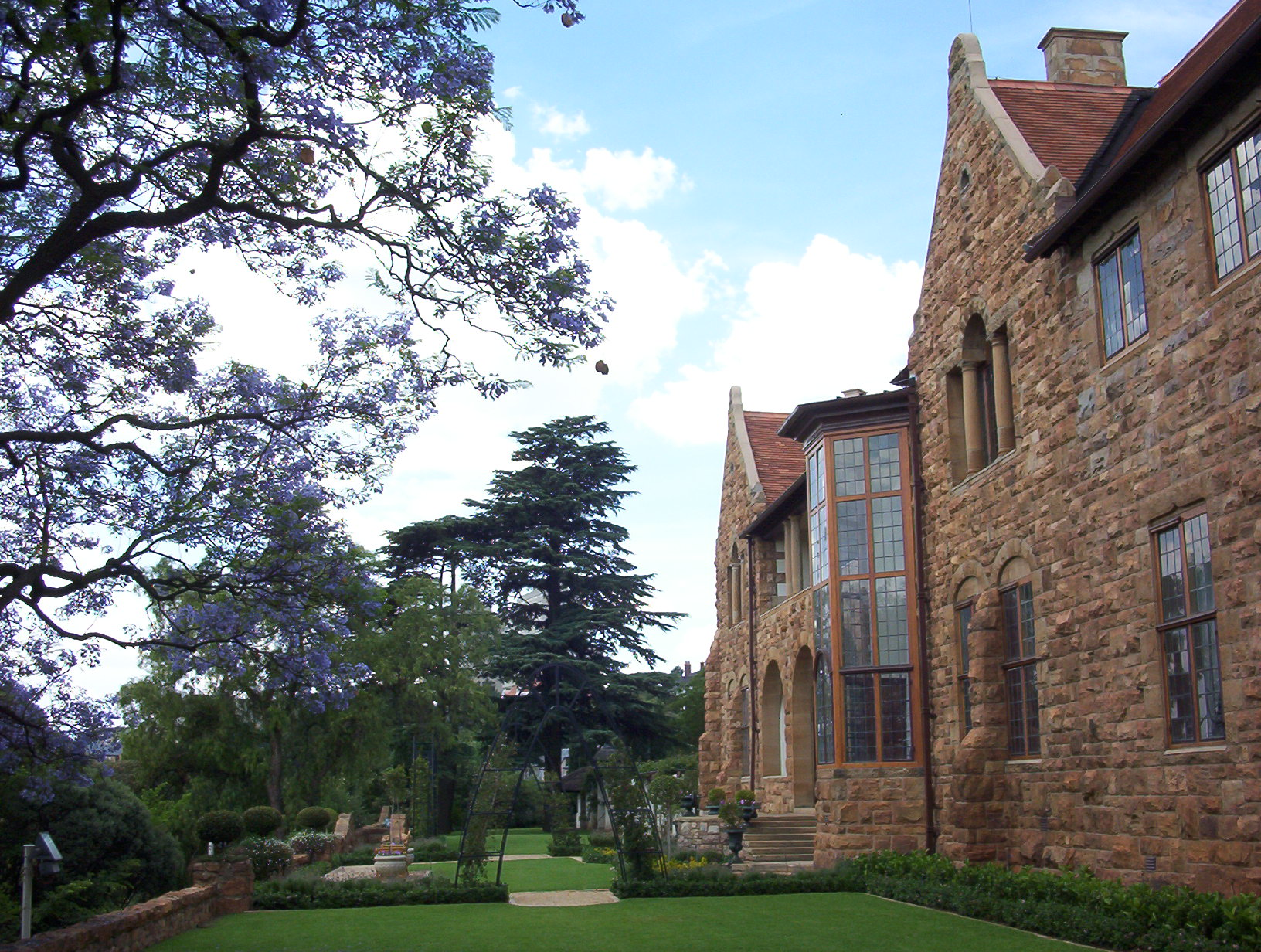
Northwards

=== Savernake (Holcombe) ===
1904, 13 Jubilee Road designed by Leck and Emley.

Savernake or Holcombe as it was originally known was built for Surgeon Major W.T.F. Davies. In 1916 it was purchased by Dr Bernard Price and was associated with the University of the Witwatersrand. The house is now owned by the University of the Witwatersrand and is home to the Vice-Chancellor.

=== Sunny Side Park ===
1896, 2 York Road designed by Frank Emley

The house was designed for Hennen Jennings. It became the primary residence of Lord Alfred Milner during the Anglo Boer War.

The house and grounds now form the premises for the Sunny Side Park Hotel.

=== St. Georges ===
1904, 7 Sherbourne Road, Designed by Baker and Masey

The bells of St. Georges can be heard throughout Parktown every Sunday morning at 8.30 am and to announce weddings. The church should not be confused with St. George's Cathedral, Cape Town, also designed by Baker.

=== Stonehouse ===
1902, 5 Rockridge Road designed by Sir Herbert Baker

This was the private Transvaal residence of the renowned South African architect Sir Herbert Baker, the designer of the Union Buildings. It was the first house which he designed in Johannesburg and also housed members of Milner's Kindergarten.

=== The Mount ===
1910, 9 Jubilee Road designed by Robert Smith-Murdoch

The Mount (also formerly known as House Selke) is located at 9 Jubilee Road in Parktown. This double storey timber shingle roofed Edwardian residence was built in 1910 for Mr J W Selke. The building shows some influences of the 'baronial' style of Parktown, with its grand entry and imposing siting, and possibly of Baker who was active in the area with its use of stone from the site for its foundations, the simple form of the timber shingle roof and the columns used at the entrance.

As the name implies, the house is located high on the ridge with a panoramic view. It was formerly owned by Becker and then by the National Cancer Association of South Africa in 1970, before being acquired by Wits in 1977. The property was acquired at a time when the residential character of large portions of Parktown had been eroded by large scale institutional developments including the Johannesburg College of Education (now Wits Education campus) on the southern side of Jubilee Road. The Mount then housed the Wits Centre of Continuing Education and until recently was leased by the university from 1992–2012 to the Institute for the Advancement of Journalism. It currently houses Wits' Sydney Brenner Institute for Molecular Bioscience.

It was designed by the architect Robert Smith Murdoch, also referred to as Robert Smith-Murdoch. He was born in Glasgow, Scotland, in 1874. He was educated and articled in Glasgow before coming to South Africa in 1898. He spent his time during the Anglo Boer War in Cape Town before leaving for Johannesburg in 1901. In Johannesburg he was listed as an architect and civil engineer. The Mount is to date his only known architectural work.

=== The View ===
1897, 18 Ridge Road designed by Aburrow and Treeby.

The View is ostensibly the oldest house left standing in Johannesburg. It was built by Charles Aburrow as the residence of Sir Thomas Cullinan, with a west wing added in 1903 by the Aburrow and Treeby partnership. The house is typically Victorian in Style, built from burnt red bricks with a corrugated iron roof, wooden balconies and large bay windows. It is typically decorated with intricate iron work. The house derives its name from the incredible views once available from the house and its balconies. On a clear day one would have been able to see as far as the Magaliesberg. The construction of the 1950s to 1970s has left only a view of the University of the Witwatersrand Education Campus. Lady Cullinan lived in the house until 1963. The house is now home to the Transvaal Scottish Regiment's headquarters and is open as a museum and available as a business venue. Directly across the road from the house is the SA Scottish Memorial, a memorial dedicated to the South African Scots who fell during both World Wars.

Sunny Side Park

St. Georges Anglican Church

The Stone house

The View

=== Villa Arcadia ===
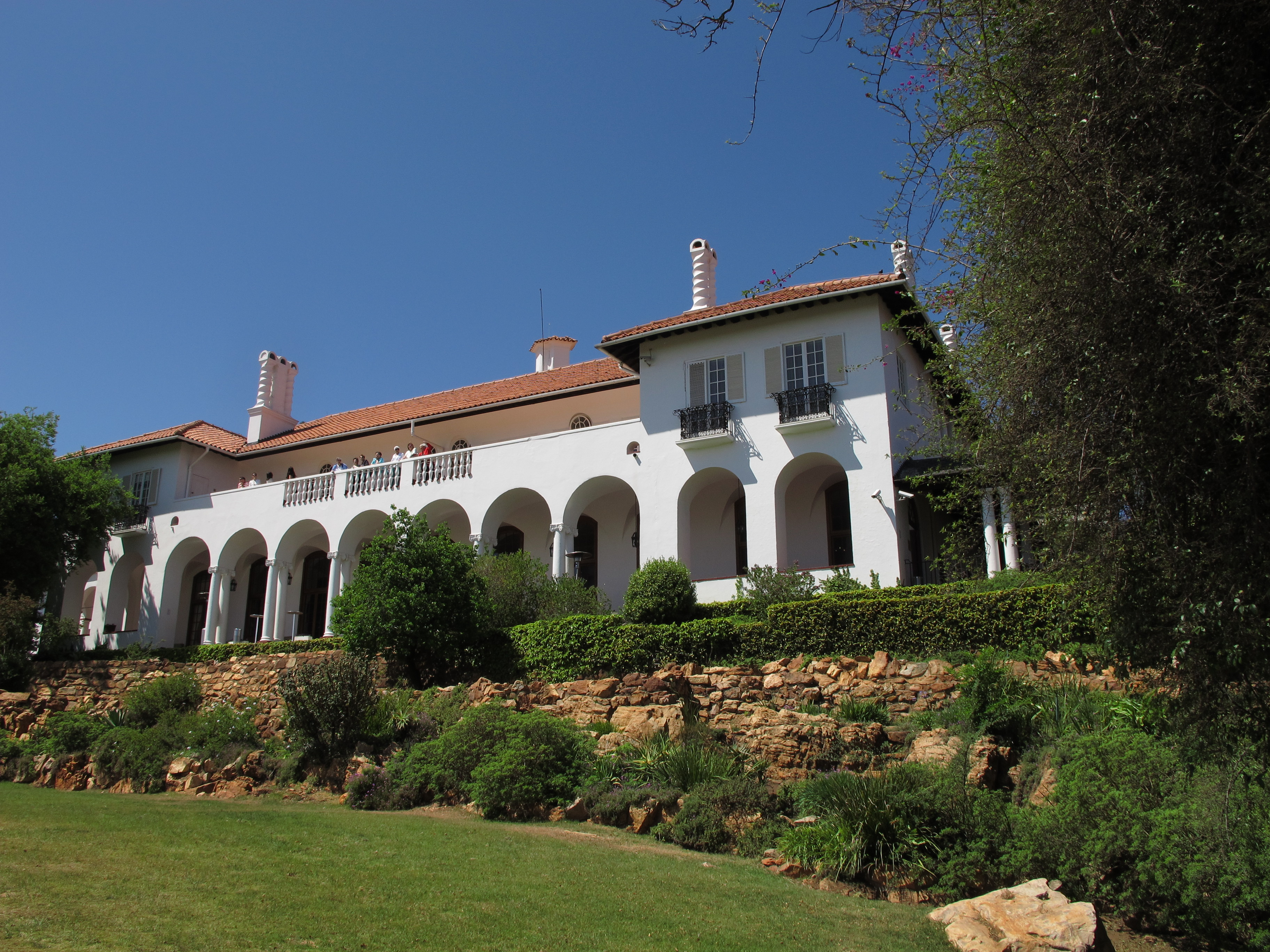
Villa Arcadia

The first building here was a Swiss Chalet imported ready to assemble in 1897. In 1909 Baker and Masey were employed to design a new house and the current Villa Arcadia was completed with lot of input and design changes from the owner Florence Philips. The house features a long veranda on the ground floor fronted by eleven arches with extensive views, stretching past the M1 motorway and overlooking the suburbs of Saxonwold, Forest Town and the city's zoo. A music room was added to the house by Baker, separated from the house by an elegantly landscaped cloistered courtyard.

The property was sold and a Jewish orphanage was established in the house in 1923. The House itself now houses a modern art collection and an insurance company.

=== Wanooka Place ===
1902, 6 Albany Road designed by FW Smith

Wanooka Place was constructed in 1902 for Henry Smith Greenwood, who was the resident engineer of the central division of the Central South African Railways. He occupied the Tudor-gabled Edwardian mansion until 1908, when he returned to his native Ontario, in Canada. It was then home to several other engineers. It is deemed significant for its association with the development of the SAR & H.

== Other heritage homes in Parktown ==
Aside from those listed above there are many other important Heritage homes still standing in Parktown. The list includes but is not limited to 12 Park Lane, The Angles, The Bell House, Clovelly, Earnholm, Kleine Schuur, The Moot House (built for Richard Feetham), Pilrig House and Stables, The Pines, Prospect Terrace, Ridgeholm, The Shires (Outeniqua) and St. Margarets.

== Other mansions near Parktown ==
=== Glenshiels Stables and The Priory ===
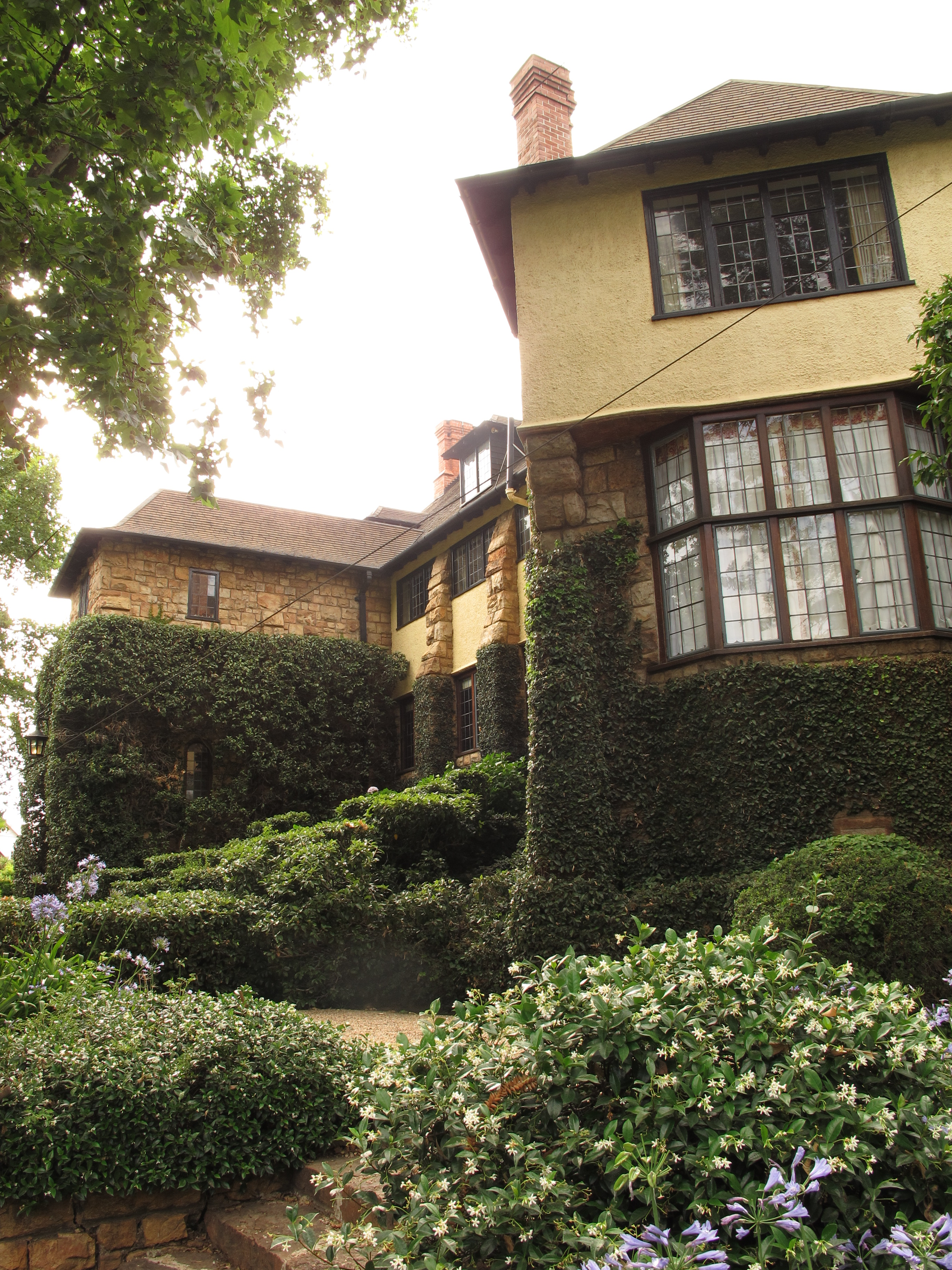
Glenshiels

1911, 19 Woolston Drive, Westcliff designed by Herbert Baker and F.L.H. Fleming.

Built for Sir William and Lady Isobel Dalrymple, who were famous for the lavish parties that they threw at their Westcliff home, Glenshiel. It was one of the first Johannesburg homes to have a swimming pool and tennis courts. In 1941, after Sir William's, death the 11-hectare (27-acre) property was divided in two. The 2.8-hectare (7-acre) portion on which the home and stables stood was bought by a Major Gordon Haggie and the rest now forms the grounds of many newer homes and the Westcliff Hotel. Major Haggie immediately lent the house to the Order of St. John and it ran as a convalescence ward for wartime amputees until 1946. In 1950 Haggie had the stables converted into a home in which his family live to this day and loaned the house to the Order of St. John indefinitely. It now forms their main offices in Johannesburg.

=== Pallinghurst (The Hope Home) ===
34 Pallinghurst Road, Westcliff. The architect for this house is unknown, however Baker and Masey were responsible for the stables. Was built for R.W. Schumacher, a Rand Mines Chairman. He would donate the house in 1915 to the City of Johannesburg and would become the Hope Convalescent Home for Crippled Children.

=== Whitehall Court ===
1924, 4th Street, Killarney. Designed by John Moffat

This house was the private residence of Isidore W. Schlesinger, founder of African Film productions and the Killarney Film Studios. The Schlesingers were influential in building the Suburb of Killarney and in 1972, after the studios were moved to Balfour Park, John Schlesinger demolished the studio and built Johannesburg's first major Shopping Mall, the Killarney Mall.

The house was designed in the American style including colonialist and art deco elements. It is a three-story square building with a large courtyard and is now an elegant sectional title apartment block. Moffat was an architect of enough importance that the University of the Witwatersrand's architecture block was named after him. This, and the stables of Iniscaw on St Patrick Rd in Houghton, are the last John Moffat buildings left standing.

Gazetteer of sites
Site	Location
Bishopskop	26°10′58″S 28°1′30″E
Brenthurst	26°10′22″S 28°2′44″E
Dolobran	26°10′43″S 28°2′15″E
Eikenlaan	26°10′57″S 28°02′08″E
Emoyeni	26°10′37″S 28°02′27″E
Hazeldene Hall	26°10′52″S 28°02′45″E
Hohenheim	26°10′30″S 28°02′39″E
North Lodge	26°10′46″S 28°02′13″E
Northwards	26°10′40″S 28°02′04″E
Savernake (Holcombe)	26°10′38″S 28°02′24″E
Sunny Side Park	26°10′46″S 28°02′51″E
St. Georges	26°10′50″S 28°01′55″E
Stonehouse	26°10′42″S 28°01′55″E
The View	26°10′53″S 28°02′43″E
Villa Arcadia	26°10′28″S 28°02′29″E
Wanooka Place	26°11′00″S 28°02′01″E

== See also ==
- List of castles and fortifications in South Africa
