= Northwards House =

Coordinates: 26°10′38″S 28°02′11″E

Northwards House is a South African mansion located on the Parktown Ridge, in Johannesburg. The building was designed by Sir Herbert Baker, Francis Massey and Ernest Sloper. Northwards has its origins in the world's largest Gold Rush and the Boer War. The mansion and its owners were a central part of Parktown, a residential suburb set apart from a mining town, with churches, schools, parks, a zoo and a forest. This beautiful building (and the neighbouring houses) were part of the Secretary of State for the Colonies's efforts to rebuild South Africa and manufacture a set of European values that firmly established the empire in South African soil, with the intention of expanding this influence "northwards".

== History ==
This home on Rockridge Road was commissioned by John Dale Lace, the owner of the Lace Diamond Mine, in the same year that the Treaty of Vereeniging was signed. The house is built out of dressed mountain stone and brick. Bakers penchant for the arts and crafts movement is combined with Dutch and Flemish gables.

Johannesburg's flamboyant socialite Josephine Dale Lace, who was known for her zebra-drawn carriage lived there from 1904 to 1911.

== Restoration ==
A disastrous fire in 1912 destroyed much of the west wing. In 1911 George Albu had bought the mansion for £12,000 from the Dale Laces when they were in financial distress, and he restored the building.

== Present day ==
Today, this mansion is a well kept national monument and the home to Johannesburg Heritage Foundation, and it continues to occupy a key position in Johannesburg's institutional belt. The facility is now owned and run by the Northwards Trust, and cultural and educational institutions use the building for offices, performances and functions.
