= Kwa Mai Mai Traditional Market =

Traditional market and culture hub in Johannesburg

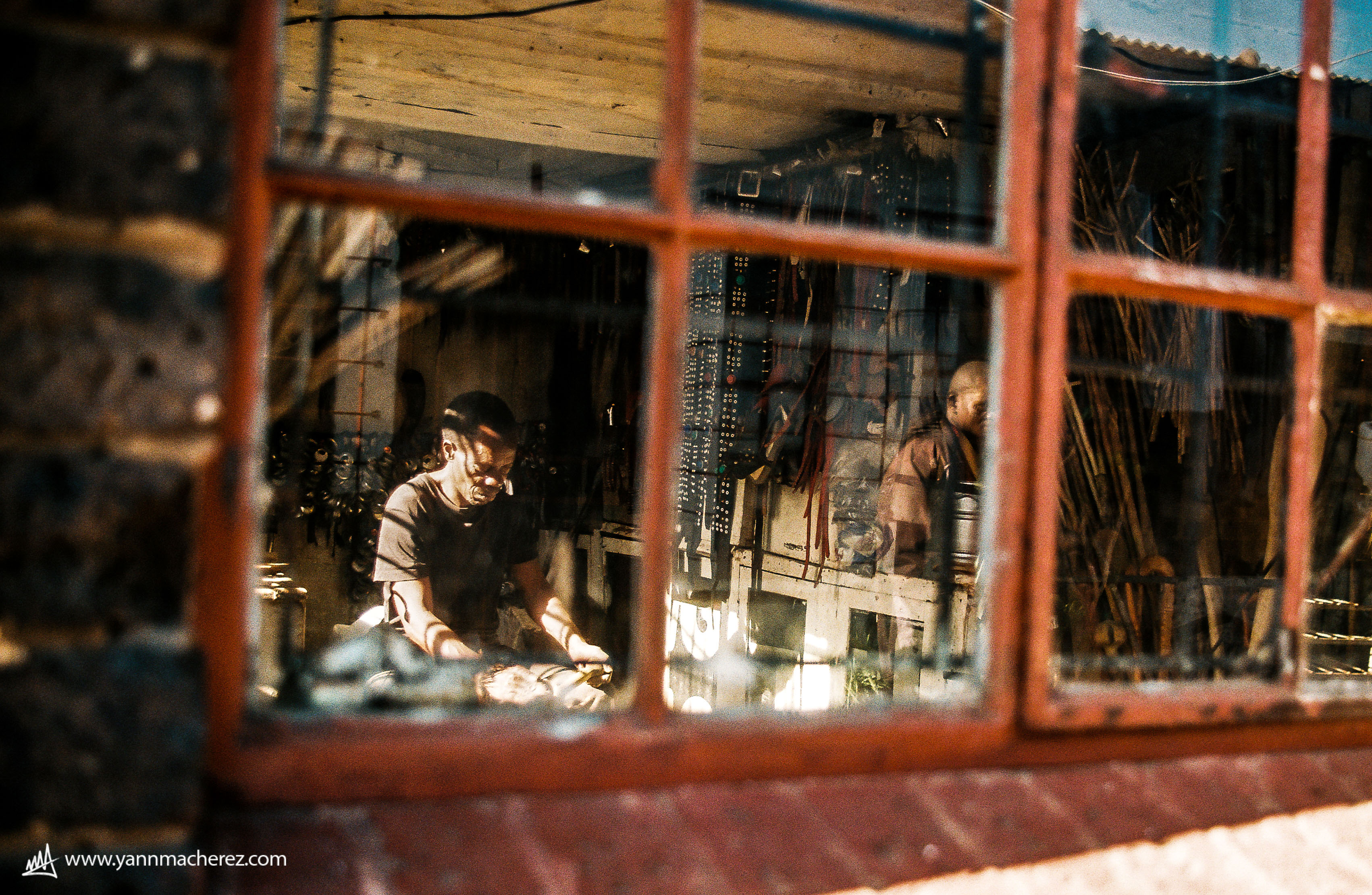
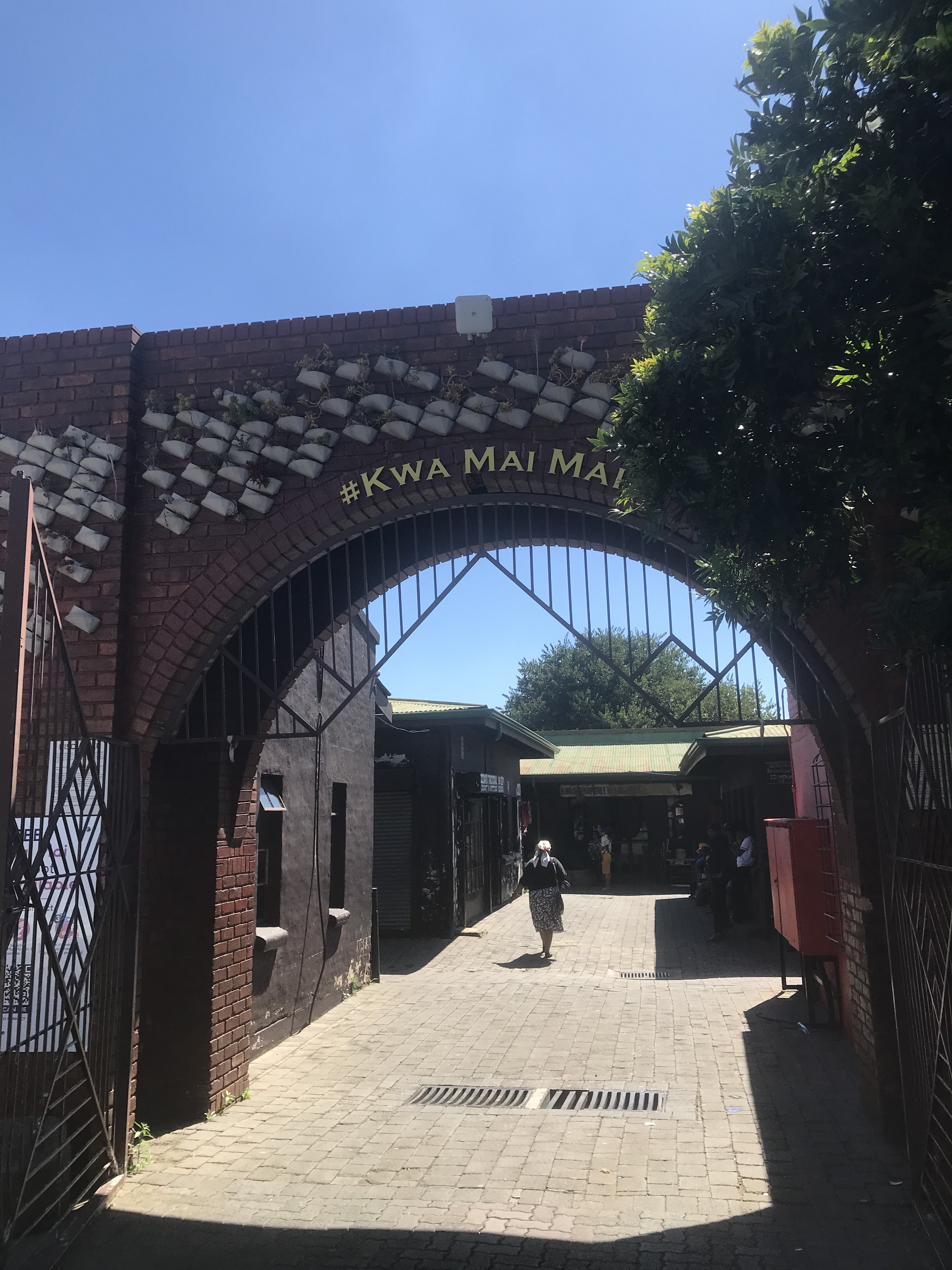
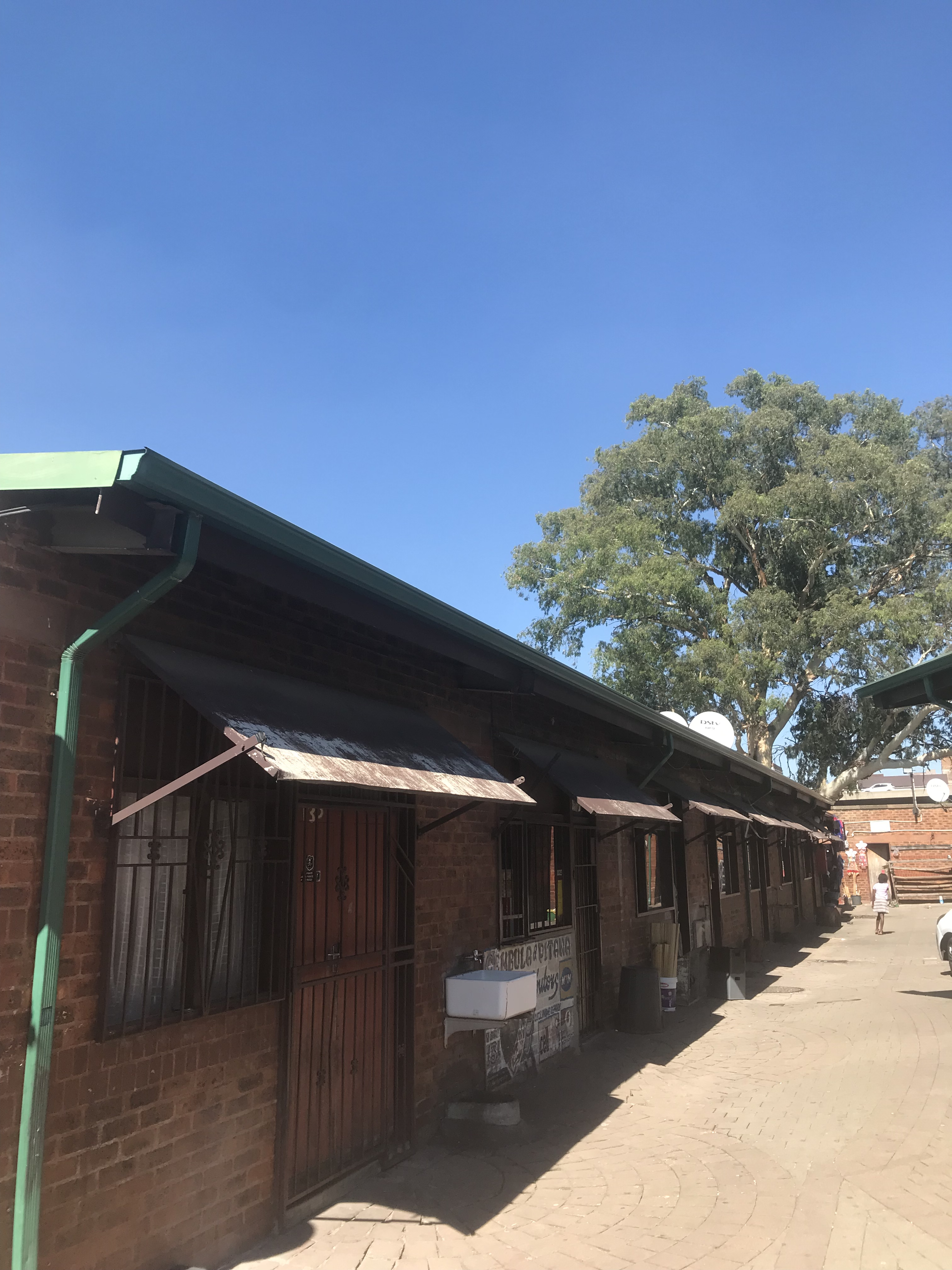
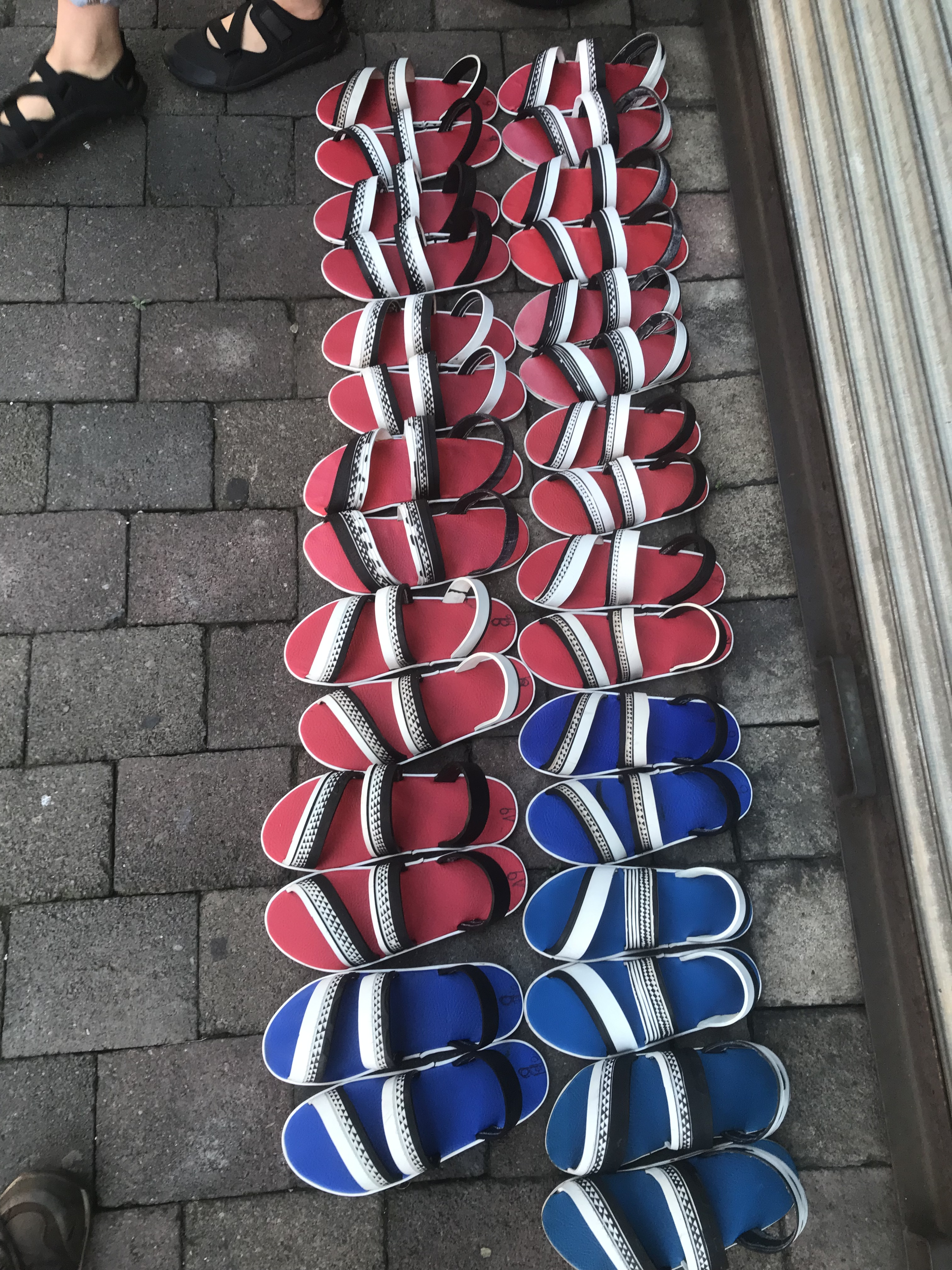
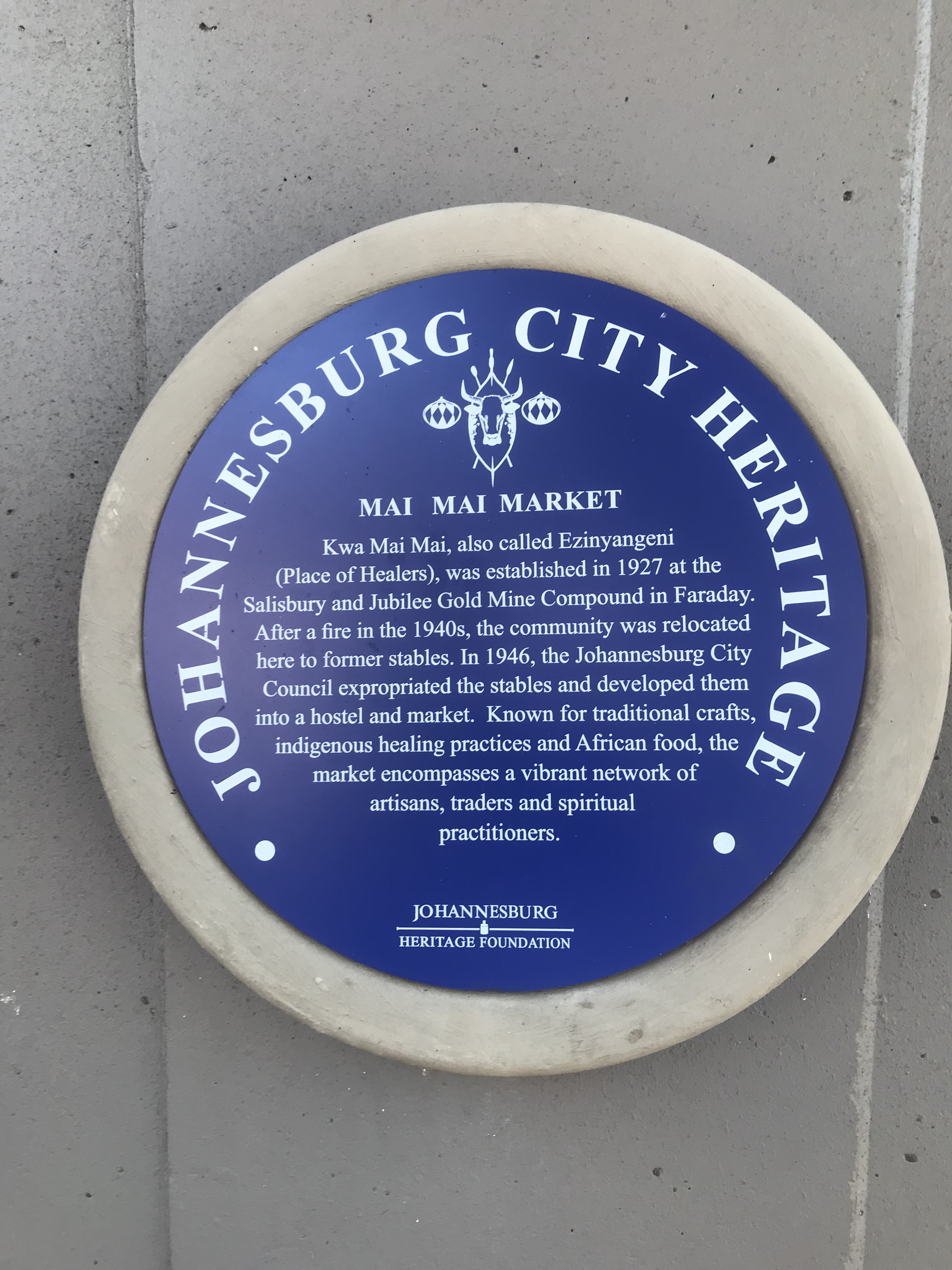
- Craftsman in deep concentration. Entrance to the market area Small side street in Kwa Mai-Mai Handmade sandals (izimbadada or izingxabulela) Blue plaque Meeting points at Kwa Mai-Mai Traditional Market.
- Map of the area of Kwa Mai Mai, including the Natal Spruit Canal. Interactive map of Kwa Mai Mai Traditional Market

Kwa Mai Mai Traditional Market also known as Ezinyangeni, (the Place of Healers) is a fixed market and a collection of cultural memories, a venue where curators of cultural beliefs ply their trades. Located underneath overpasses and bridges, Kwa Mai Mai acts as heritage site, cultural hub, arts & craft market in Jeppestown, Johannesburg, South Africa. Kwa Mai-Mai is more than an informal trading market, it is home to approximately 600 people and generations of families have made this a place for indigenous medicine and traditional healing as well as a central meeting place on weekend's with a vibrant street culture and flame grilled meet. Families, who live in this area, have worked together as a community to re-imagine their realities. Visitors will find a neat and compact village with paved alleys, small shops and a tightly knit community.

== Blue Plaque ==
The City of Johannesburg partnered together with the Johannesburg Heritage Foundation to install a blue plaque on the 10 July 2025.
