= Parktown North =

- Location within Gauteng Location within South Africa
- Coordinates: 26.142°S 28.027°E
- Country: South Africa
- Province: Gauteng
- Municipality: City of Johannesburg
- Main Place: Johannesburg

Area
  - Total: 1.72 km^{2} (0.66 sq mi)

Population (2011)
  - Total: 3,857
  - Density: 2,240/km^{2} (5,810/sq mi)

Racial makeup (2011)
  - Black African: 26.1%
  - Coloured: 1.2%
  - Indian/Asian: 2.5%
  - White: 68.6%
  - Other: 1.6%

First languages (2011)
  - English: 69.4%
  - Afrikaans: 9.3%
  - Zulu: 5.3%
  - Tswana: 2.9%
  - Other: 13.2%
- Time zone: UTC+2 (SAST)
- Postal code (street): 2193

Parktown North is a suburb of Johannesburg, South Africa.

The suburb has many old colonial-style houses, and manages to maintain a village atmosphere, despite being near to one of the busiest roads in the city, Jan Smuts Avenue. It is one of the older residential areas of the Northern Suburbs, having been created as a residential area for the less affluent relatives of the Randlords who had built their mansions on Parktown Ridge during the early days of the Rand gold rush (during the 1890s). It takes its name from being north of Parktown.

Parktown North is in close proximity to the Gautrain and has many bus stops that transport commuters to Gautrain stations.

Many suburbs of Johannesburg are laid out as grids with numbered streets in one direction and numbered avenues intersecting perpendicularly. Parktown North is the only suburb of Johannesburg to have only numbered avenues with no numbered streets. It is not a grid and the avenues run in all directions. The suburb is built around a small spring and lake, however this is not visible from the street and is hidden from the public separating the gardens of three private houses.

Parktown North is a popular dining out venue for Johannesburg residents. Most notably 7th Avenue is home to many of the area's top restaurants. Parktown North has an active Residents Association (PNRA) that looks after its many interests around the suburb from Heritage, building and electrical issues, to power outage and maintenance issues.
