= Johannesburg blue plaques =

Heritage scheme in Johannesburg, South Africa

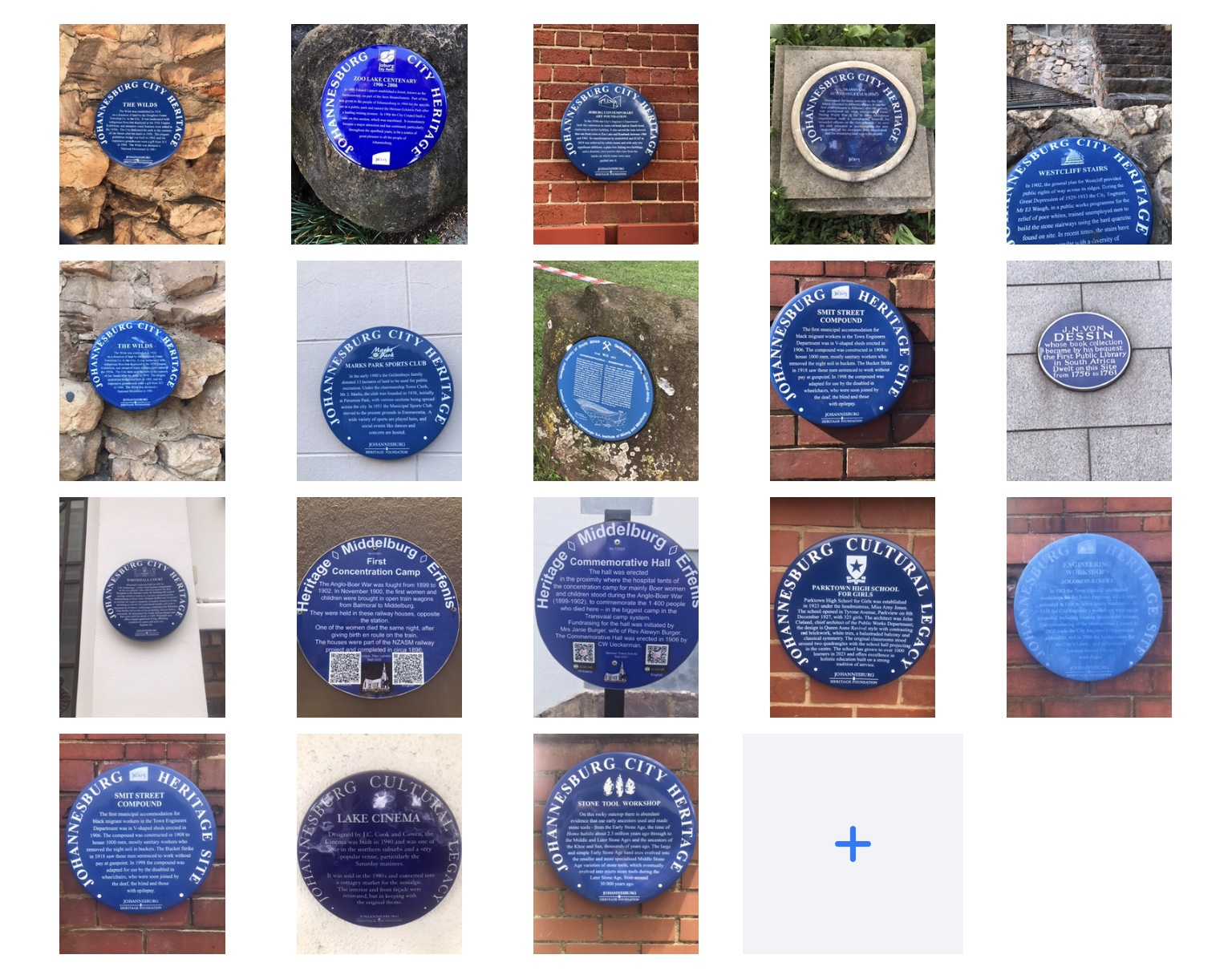
Small collection of blue plaque photos taken across Johannesburg.

Johannesburg blue plaques are blue plaques, historical markers in Johannesburg, South Africa. The city and its citizens have embraced the idea of connecting people with places; material culture with architecture; or struggles against oppression and erasure. Blue plaques offer those who are interested in the built environment or social history a spatial perspective to notable figures and events in early Johannesburg history. Johannesburg has a contested past and plaques are found in both suburbs and townships, commemorating the complex heritage of the city.

The Johannesburg Heritage Foundation indicates historic landmarks with blue plaques, to increase the public consciousness of their own heritage by making them aware of significant locations.

While the plaques do not have any formal or legislated status and do not prevent demolition or alterations of buildings, they serve as a mechanism to raise awareness among property owners and citizens about their heritage. The plaques also introduce visitors to noteworthy sites in the city. A range of blue plaques commemorate the layered history and geography of the city.

- Johannesburg Heritage Foundation
- Alexandra Heritage Centre

== History ==
Johannesburg blue plaques go at least as far back as 1980 The initiative for the wide-scale adoption of blue plaques in Johannesburg came from Herbert Prinn in 1986, when Johannesburg was celebrating its centenary with 100 blue plaques. The earliest record from the City of Johannesburg for awarding plaques is 2003.

== Making and mounting plaques ==
A blue plaque is mounted on a structure or feature, associated with notable individuals or events. The plaques are circular and bordered with text that pertains to a relevant theme. In the centre of the plaque is a short citation and a logo below.

== Future of blue plaques ==
Much like many other countries, the legacies of those who are commemorated with are contested. Recently another heritage register was set up after the domain BluePlaques.co.za was bought by an online casino, but a newly compiled Heritage Register permits property owners to establish the heritage status of a property, and citizens to know more about their local history. It's anticipated that a blue plaques app will follow shortly.
