= Joubert Park =

- Location within Gauteng Location within South Africa
- Coordinates: 26.1991°S 28.0491°E
- Country: South Africa
- Province: Gauteng
- Municipality: City of Johannesburg

Area
  - Total: 1.06 km^{2} (0.41 sq mi)

Population (2001)
  - Total: 29,468
  - Density: 27,800/km^{2} (72,000/sq mi)
- Time zone: UTC+2 (SAST)

Joubert Park is a suburb of Johannesburg, South Africa. It is located in Region F of the City of Johannesburg Metropolitan Municipality. The suburb shares its name with the largest park in the Central Business District, which is located a few blocks from the main train station for the city (known as Park Station).

Joubert Park is the location of the Johannesburg Art Gallery.
