= Parktown =

- Location within Gauteng Location within South Africa Location within Africa
- Coordinates: 26°10′S 28°1′E
- Country: South Africa
- Province: Gauteng
- Municipality: City of Johannesburg
- Main Place: Johannesburg

Area
  - Total: 3.79 km^{2} (1.46 sq mi)

Population (2011)
  - Total: 6,936
  - Density: 1,830/km^{2} (4,740/sq mi)

Racial makeup (2011)
  - Black African: 68.4%
  - Coloured: 2.5%
  - Indian/Asian: 9.3%
  - White: 18.6%
  - Other: 1.2%

First languages (2011)
  - English: 39.3%
  - Zulu: 18.5%
  - Southern Ndebele: 8.9%
  - Afrikaans: 6.0%
  - Other: 27.3%
- Time zone: UTC+2 (SAST)
- Postal code (street): 2193

Parktown is a wealthy suburb of Johannesburg, South Africa, and is the first suburb north of the inner city (both chronologically and geographically). It is affectionately known as one of the Parks, others including Parkview, Parkwood, Westcliff, Parktown North, Parkhurst and Forest Town. Parktown is one of Johannesburg's largest suburbs, neighbouring Hillbrow, Braamfontein and Milpark to the South; Berea and Houghton to the East; Killarney and Forest Town to the North, and Westcliff, Melville and Richmond to the West. Originally established by the Randlords in the 1890s, Parktown is now home to many businesses, hospitals, schools, churches and restaurants, whilst still maintaining quiet residential areas. It is also home to three of the five campuses of the University of the Witwatersrand including the education campus, medical school and Wits Business School. It is located in Region F of the City of Johannesburg Metropolitan Municipality.

Nadine Gordimer (1923 - 2014), the first South African Nobel Laureate in Literature (1991), lived in a home on Jan Smuts Avenue for over fifty years, until her death in 2014.

== History ==
In 1890 Edouard Lippert bought a substantial tract of the Braamfontein Farm. He rebuilt the farm house located on a ridge and named it Marienhof after his wife, Marie. The ridge overlooked a massive plain and on this he planted the Sachsenwald Forest to supply the needs of the mines and fast developing city. He saw the promise that the ridge had for development as a township and partitioned the land into plots. In 1892, Lady Florence Phillips rode north from the dusty mining town of early Johannesburg and found the ridge. The view extended from Sachsenwald forest in the West to the Magaliesberg mountains and Pretoria in the North. She persuaded her husband to build a house there and Frank Emley was commissioned to build their mansion, Hohenheim. Parktown quickly became the new elite suburb. Soon, many wealthy entrepreneurs (see Randlord) were building mansions along the ridge, and showing off their newfound affluence with parties, croquet on the lawns, and lavish dinners.

Parktown was where many conspirators of the Jameson Raid against the South African Republic were based. Today the suburb is home to many Victorian and Edwardian homes, and a number of designs by Sir Herbert Baker.

In the late 1960s, 56 of the stately homes were demolished to make way for the Johannesburg College of Education (now Wits Education Campus). In 1975 many more were demolished and properties reduced for the construction of the M1 motorway, a major artery running north to south through the center of the northern suburbs of Johannesburg.

== Parktown West ==
Rhodes Avenue. A typical Parktown street with the Jacaranda trees in full bloom

Parktown West is the section of Parktown, West of Jan Smuts Avenue. It is almost entirely residential and famous for its beautiful avenues lined with Jacaranda and Plane trees, also known as the 'itchy ball tree'. Commerce is only permitted along the Western side of Jan Smuts Avenue. Parktown West was being developed as early as 1903 with significant increase in popularity in the 1920s and 1930s.

== Architecture ==
In addition to Sir Herbert Baker, many other architects were influential in building this historical suburb, including Bertram Richard Avery, Frank Emley, James Cope Christie, Francis Fleming and Charles Aburrow. Baker's Parktown houses drew influences from the Cape Dutch revival style, which he had mastered in the Cape and combined this with stone work using "koppie stone" which was quarried in the area, often from the grounds of the houses that he built. James Cope Christie's style is eclectic drawing strong influences from Victorian styles and Art Nouveau. Charles Aburrow's designs were strongly Victorian whilst Bertram Richard Avery and Frank Emley favoured the Edwardian style.

== Economy ==
Parktown also has a business district with a number of office blocks and commercial ventures. Transnet Freight Rail (previously Spoornet) has its head office in the Inyanda House in Parktown.

== Mansions ==
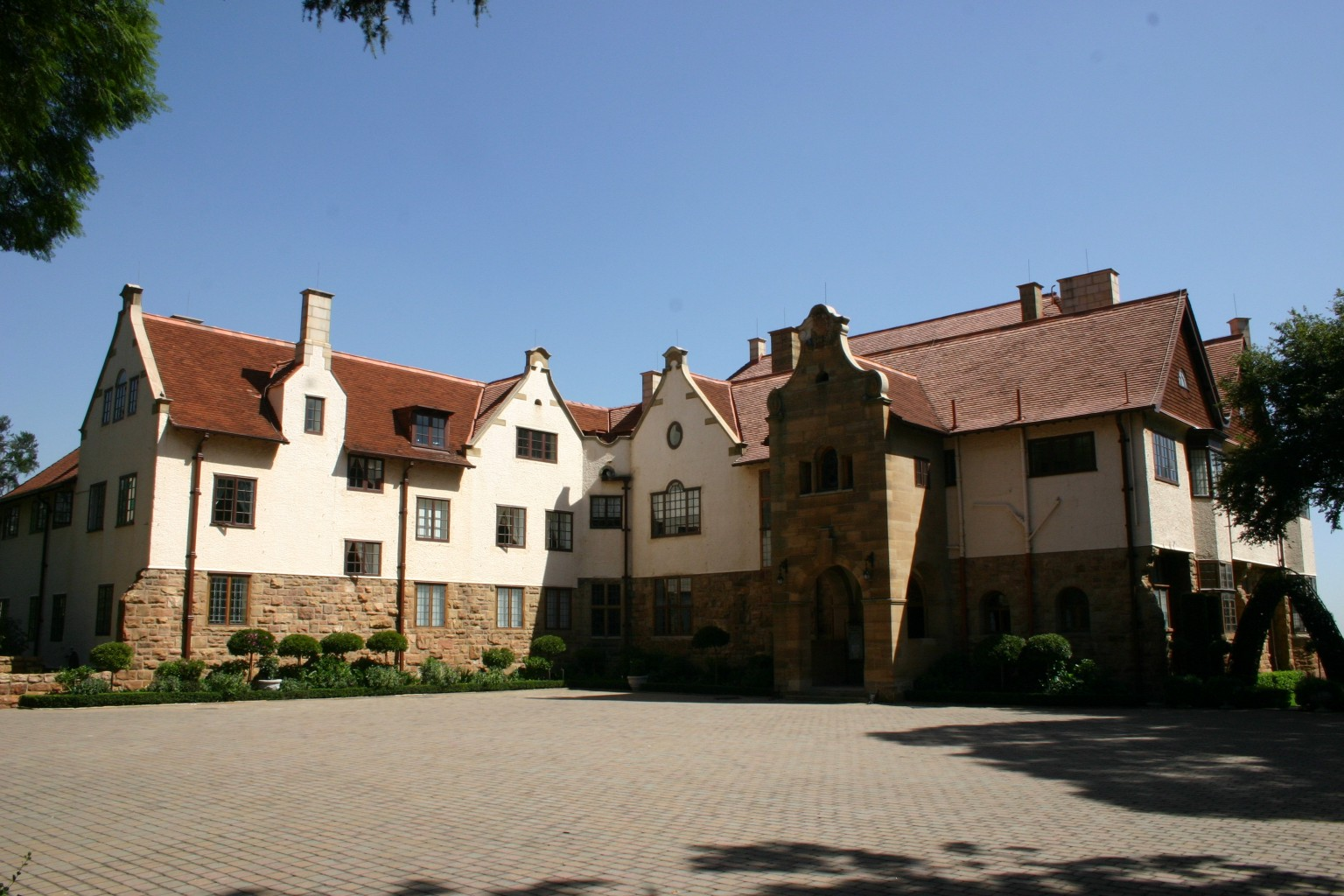
Northwards, Johannesburg 26.17720S, 28.03650E

The Parktown Mansions tell many stories of the history of Johannesburg as they were the homes of some of the most influential residents of the early city. Whilst there are a number of mansions still standing in present day Parktown, a vast majority were destroyed during the late 1960s and 1970s to facilitate the construction of the M1 motorway and the increasing popularity of Parktown as a business district.

Remaining Baker mansions in Parktown include Northwards, Villa Arcadia, Bishopskop, The Stonehouse and Brenthurst. Other important mansions include Dolobran designed by J.A. Cope Christie and North Lodge designed by J.H. Aldwyncle.

== List of schools ==
- Parktown Boys' High School School built 1922 designed by P W D (Cleland),
- Deutsche Internationale Schule Johannesburg opened in Hillbrow in 1890 moved to Parktown in 1969,
- Helpmekaar Kollege, Johannesburg's first Afrikaans school built 1921,
- The Key School, A school dedicated to the education of autistic children,
- Holy Family College (Parktown Convent) built 1905 James F. Beardwood,
- Rand Meisieskool
- Roedean School built 1903 designed Baker and Masey.
- The National School of the Arts
- John Orr Technical High School
- Roseneath Primary School

== List of hospitals and clinics ==
- Brenthurst Clinic
- Donald Gordon Medical Centre
- Johannesburg General Hospital
- Milpark Hospital
- Parklane Clinic

== Notable residents ==
- Sir Herbert Baker - Renowned architect throughout the Commonwealth
- Sir Thomas Cullinan - Diamond magnate and master builder
- Colonel John Dale Lace - Mining magnate and Randlord
- James Percy FitzPatrick - Author and mining financier
- Bruce Fordyce - 9 times Comrades Marathon winner
- Nadine Gordimer - Political activist, novelist and Nobel Prize laureate
- Taubie Kushlick - Actress
- Sarah Gertrude Millin - Author
- Alfred Milner, 1st Viscount Milner - Colonial administrator
- Sir Ernest Oppenheimer - Founder of Anglo American
- Harry Oppenheimer - Chairman of Anglo American and De Beers for 25 and 27 years respectively
- Nicky Oppenheimer - Son of Harry Oppenheimer and family
- Dorothea Sarah Florence Alexandra, Lady Phillips - Art patron
- Sir Lionel Phillips, 1st Baronet - Randlord and philanthropist
- Rabbi Louis Isaac Rabinowitz - Chief Rabbi in Johannesburg
- Ernest Willmot Sloper - Architect, stone mason and partner in "Baker, Masey and Sloper"
- Jane Taylor - Playwright

== Arts and culture ==
Modern-day Parktown and its surrounds form a centre of Arts and Culture in Johannesburg. The Linder Auditorium, located on the Wits Education Campus is home to the Johannesburg Philharmonic Orchestra, Johannesburg's only full-time professional orchestra. Just next door, the Williams Block houses the Johannesburg Youth Orchestra Company. The Johannesburg Children's Theatre is across the Road from the Education Campus, housed in two Parktown mansions and the South African Ballet Theatre and South African Youth Ballet are a few blocks away in Braamfontein on the Johannesburg Theatre's property.

== Places of worship and gathering ==
Parktown is also home to a diverse range of churches including a Dutch Reformed church, a beautiful 1904 Baker and Masey Anglican church, St. Georges, and the Temple of The Church of Jesus Christ of Latter-day Saints. Temple Emanuel, one of Johannesburg's last remaining Jewish Reform synagogues, is also located in Parktown.

The Johannesburg Freemasons' Hall, home to many of Johannesburg oldest masonic lodges, is also in Parktown.

== See also ==
- Parktown North
- Parktown prawn
- South African minesweeper HMSAS Parktown, sank off Tobruk in 1942, named after the Johannesburg suburb of Parktown
