= Johannesburg Art Gallery =

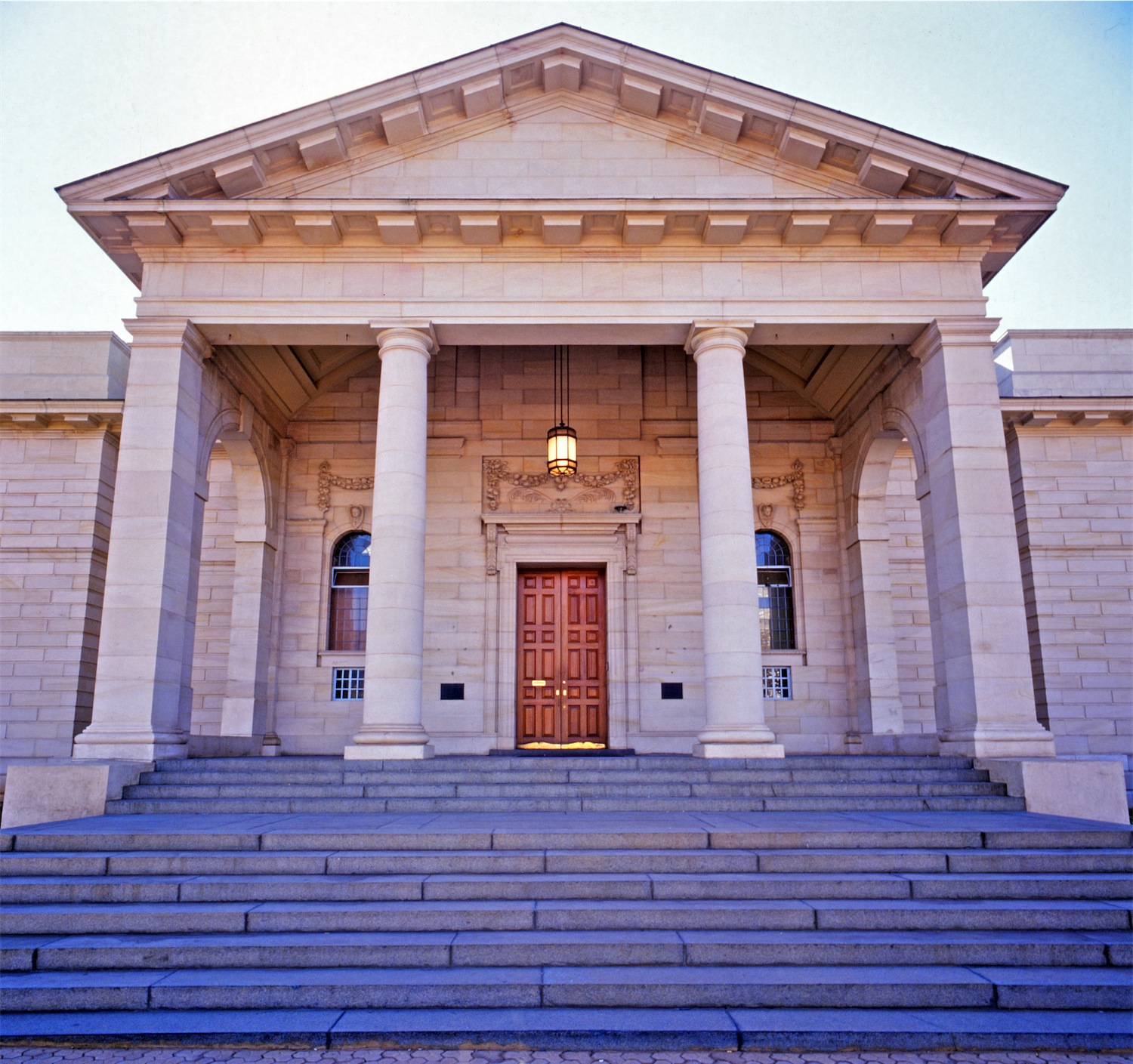
- Entrance of Johannesburg Art Gallery
- Established: 1910
- Location: Klein and King George streets, Joubert Park, Johannesburg
- Coordinates: 26.197039°S 28.047104°E
- Type: Art Museum
- Curator: Khwezi Gule
- Website: friendsofjag.org

The Johannesburg Art Gallery (JAG) is an art gallery in Joubert Park in the city centre of Johannesburg, South Africa. It was once the largest gallery on the continent with a collection of more than 9000 artworks. The gallery collection is larger than that of the Iziko South African National Gallery in Cape Town.

The building, which was completed in 1915, was designed by Sir Edwin Lutyens, with Robert Howden working as supervising architect, and consists of 15 exhibition halls and sculpture gardens. It houses collections of 17th-century Dutch paintings, 18th- and 19th-century British and European art, 19th-century South African works, a large contemporary collection of 20th-century local and international art, and a print cabinet containing works from the 15th century to the present.

Recent reports indicate that the Gallery is potentially facing a spiral of rapid decline or institutional destruction. A civil society group and volunteer organisation called Friends of JAG has been formed to help ensure "the Johannesburg Art Gallery can maintain its collection of Picassos and Rodins, Sekotos and Pierneefs." This deterioration has continued unabated since the collapse of a roofing section in 2017 due to poor maintenance. According to various media reports, the accelerated decline is due to 'inaction, corruption and theft' in the City of Johannesburg Metropolitan Municipality.

== Collection ==
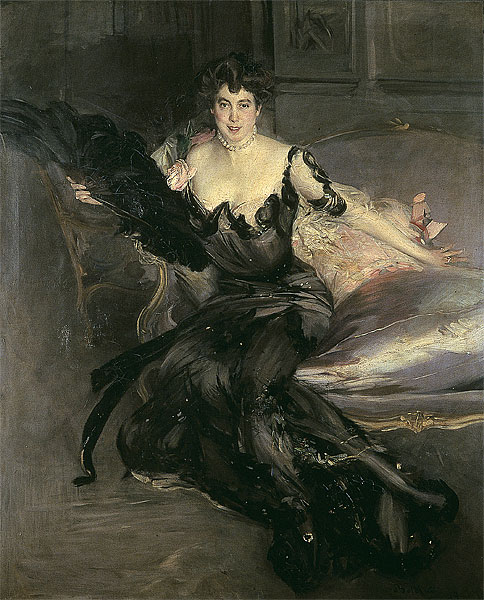
Florence, Lady Phillips by 1903 Oil on canvas 193 x 155 cm by Giovanni Boldini (1842–1931) Dublin City Gallery, The Hugh Lane

The initial collection was put together by Sir Hugh Lane, and exhibited in London in 1910 before being brought to South Africa. Florence, Lady Phillips, an art collector and wife of mining magnate Lionel Phillips, established the first gallery collection using funds donated by her husband. Lady Phillips donated her lace collection and arranged for her husband to donate seven oil paintings and a Rodin sculpture to the collection.

In 1940, Johannesburg Art Gallery became the first South African gallery to purchase a work of art by a black artist, acquiring Yellow Houses by Gerard Sekoto. Since then, it has increasingly sought to address the colonial imbalances of its collection.

The current collection includes works by Auguste Rodin, Dante Gabriel Rossetti, Pablo Picasso, Camille Pissarro, Claude Monet, Edgar Degas, Herbert Ward and Henry Moore, and South Africans such as Gerard Sekoto, Walter Battiss, Alexis Preller, Maud Sumner, Sydney Kumalo, Ezrom Legae and Pierneef. It also houses an extensive collection of the work of contemporary local artists. The works of black artists were acquired for the first time from the late 1980s.

== History ==
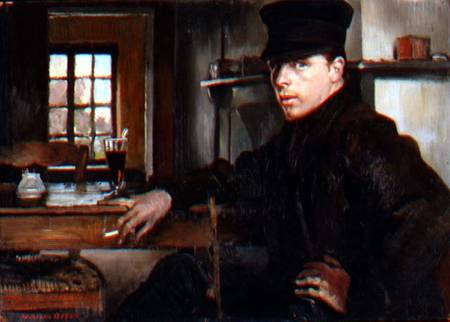
A bitter Curaçao by William Orpen, 1900.

The Johannesburg Art Gallery collection was opened to the public in 1910, before the gallery itself had been built, and was housed at the University of the Witwatersrand. The architect, Sir Edwin Lutyens, came to South Africa in 1910 to examine the site and begin the designs, after Lady Florence Phillips had secured funding from the city for a purpose-built museum. The building was built with a south-facing entrance, but was not completed according to the architect's designs—no part of the museum was broken down to let in the light. It was opened to the public, without ceremony, in 1915, just after the start of the First World War. The gallery was extended during the 1940s with east–west wings along the south galleries according to the Lutyens' design. The present north facade and galleries, constructed during the 1986–87 extension were designed by Meyer Pienaar and Associates.

In recent years the building has been poorly maintained, with many gallery halls closed and notable artworks removed from display. In 2023, the Oppenheimer family moved their collection from the deteriorating gallery to the Brenthurst Library.

== Citizen engagement ==
The Johannesburg art gallery has been a major focus of urban regeneration programmes, used to provide the base for the Joubert Park Public Art Project (JPP) . The JPP contributed to the artistic, cultural and social development of the Joubert Park precinct, while developing links with community centres based in the surrounding area. The Friends of JAG have also lobbied to support & raise funds for Johannesburg Art Gallery, and assist with running activities and educational programmes, intended "to nourish the roots of culture".

There are growing concerns about City of Johannesburg Metropolitan Municipality's poor maintenance of the Lutyens building, combined with deteriorating gallery conditions, such as water leaks and a lack of temperature control. This has caused concerns about the deterioration of "valuable and culturally significant art". Calls to shift the art collection from the city have been made, and a demand, from the Johannesburg Heritage Foundation and the Friends of JAG, to the City of Johannesburg Metropolitan Municipality, to respect their mandate of care for both the JAG building and the art collection therein, were issued.

== Chief curators ==
- P Anton Hendriks (1937–1964)
- Nel Erasmus (1964–1977)
- Pat Senior (1977–1983)
- Christopher Till (1983–1991)
- Rochelle Keene (1991–2003)
- Clive Kellner (2004–2008)
- Antoinette Murdoch (2009 – January 2017)
- Musha Nehuleni (acting curator, January 2017 – December 2018)
- Khwezi Gule (2019–present)
