= Brenthurst Library =

Africana library in Johannesburg

- 26.171307278804512°S 28.043967605489623°E
- Location: Parktown, Johannesburg, South Africa
- Established: 1984

Other information
- Website: https://www.brenthurst.org.za/

The Brenthurst Library is a private repository of Africana in Parktown, Johannesburg built by Harry Oppenheimer in 1984 as he started to disengage from the family's mining interests. It houses a collection of some 20,000 volumes, including rare manuscripts and documents. Among these were the only complete record of the proceedings of the treason trial of Nelson Mandela, until the papers were handed over to the Mandela estate in November 2008.

The Brenthurst Library collection focuses mainly on the southern African region with most of the materials created from the 16th century until the 21st century. The collection consists of art, books & pamphlets, manuscripts, maps, and photographs. One of the oldest items in the collection was published in approximately 1488. The book, an incunabulum, records exploration routes down the West African coast discovered by Portuguese explorers. The manuscript collection is diverse and contains materials such as: letters, title deeds, press clippings and company records. There is also a wide range of people represented with materials from soldiers, politicians, explorers, to musicians. There are many important letters and correspondents about South African Wars. One of the collection's most famous letters is from Leo Tolstoy to Mohandas Gandhi. The map collection consists of nautical charts, manuscript maps, and decorative engraved maps. Most of the maps in the collection are from the early half of the 17th century. All of the maps are related to Africa, southern Africa, and South Africa. The collection also holds the first known map representing the African continent. The photograph collection houses films, postcards, photographs, stereographs, and lantern slides. The works were taken by amateur and professional photographers that captured important South African places and events. The oldest photograph in the collection is a portrait of Thomas Baines created by using the salted paper method.

A permanent exhibition is a 6-paneled mural entitled, The Bridge. The piece was commissioned by H. F. Oppenheimer from an Australian artist, Leonard French, for the opening of the new building in 1984. The mural does not depict one event, but represents the fractured nature of the human condition and society of the time in South Africa. In 2023, the Oppenheimer family moved their collection from the Johannesburg Art Gallery (JAG) to the Brenthurst Library. The collection had been on permanent loan to the JAG since the mid-1980s. However, the building conditions have deteriorated significantly in recent years.
