= Lionel Phillips =

South African businessman

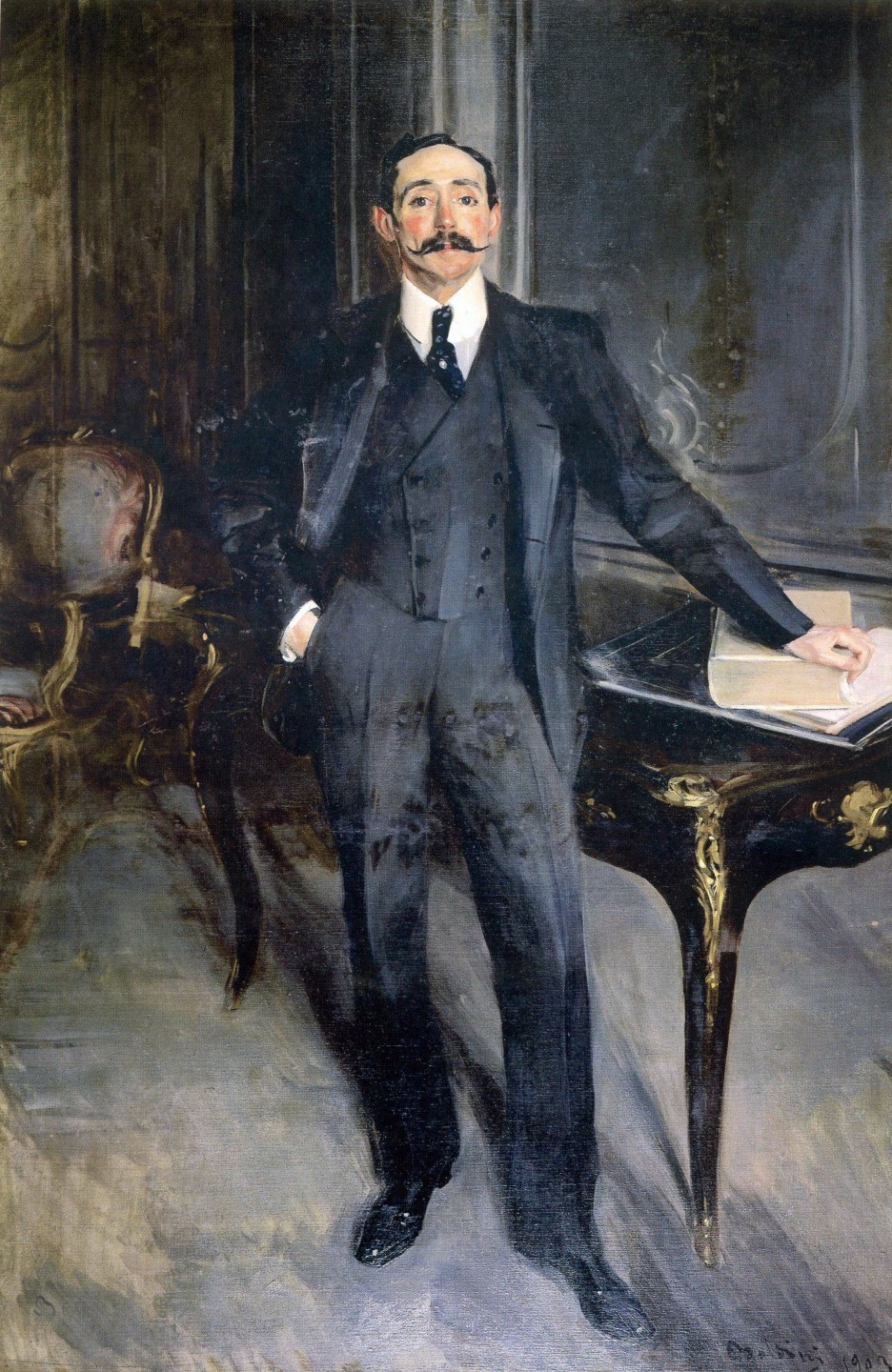
Portrait of Lionel Phillips 1903 Oil on canvas 200 x 130 cm by Giovanni BOLDINI (1845–1931) Courtesy Johannesburg Art Gallery

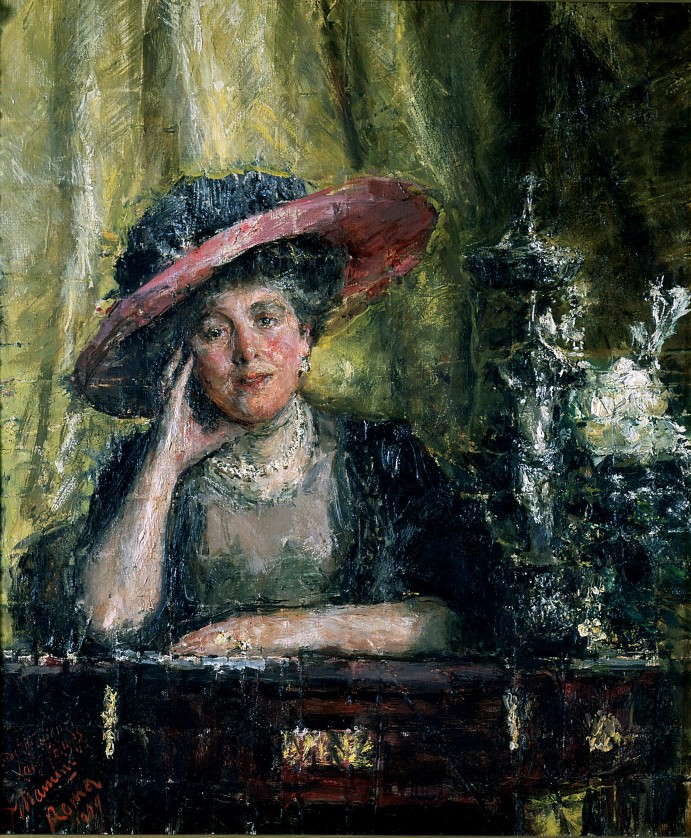
Lady Phillips 1909 Oil on canvas 89 x 75 cm by Antonio Mancini (1852–1930) Courtesy Johannesburg Art Gallery

Sir Lionel Phillips, 1st Baronet (6 August 1855 – 2 July 1936) was a British-born South African financier, mining magnate and politician.

== Early life ==
Phillips was born in London on 6 August 1855 to Phillip Phillips, a trader, and his wife Jane Lazerus. He was one of three sons and the family was lower middle-class, thus his early formal education was very limited. He commenced working for his father as a bookkeeper at the age of 14 but soon left the business and ventured out on his own, joining a firm of London diamond-sorters. Hearing of the discovery of large diamond deposits in Kimberley, he decided to seek his fortune and emigrate to the Cape Colony. He arrived at the Kimberley diamond fields in 1875, having walked most of the way there from Cape Town, and worked for Joseph Benjamin Robinson as a diamond sorter, fleetingly ran a newspaper, The Independent, and later became a mine manager. He soon went into partnership with Alfred Beit and made and lost his first fortune in Kimberley with investments in the diamond industry.

== Gold mining and political career ==
Cecil Rhodes and Alfred Beit befriended him and in 1889, he became a mining consultant at the gold mining concern Corner House to Hermann Eckstein & Co., in which Beit was the majority shareholder. Phillips was described as "wiry" and having "immense energy and tenacity of purpose" – he had hoped once to be the manager of De Beers, but Beit offered £2,500 a year, expenses paid and 10 per cent of the profits from managing the firm's interests in the Nellmapius Syndicate. Phillips arrived in Johannesburg at a chaotic time, with Jules Porgès (ne Yehuda Porges a financier from Vienna) on the verge of retiring and the Johannesburg share market in turmoil after a potential disaster had been discovered in the mines.

Within a short while, Phillips became a leading player in the mining industry, as well as an active supporter of the Uitlander movement against the Transvaal Republic government. In 1885, he married Florence Ortlepp. He succeeded Eckstein as chairman of the Chamber of Mines in 1892. The Phillips' house, Hohenheim, was built where the Johannesburg General Hospital presently stands, after Florence had suggested the laying out of the suburb Parktown, to escape the dust problem created by the ever-growing mine dumps south of the city. Hohenheim was the first mansion built in Parktown, designed by Frank Emley in 1892, and later became the home of Sir Percy FitzPatrick, author and mining financier. In 1909, the family moved to Villa Arcadia.

Vergelegen Estate

Phillips made his political affiliations clear in a speech at the inauguration of the Chamber of Mines' new offices in November 1895. After the abortive Jameson Raid, Phillips' measure of involvement in the Reformers' movement was revealed; the Reform Committee was a 56-member committee representing the grievances of Johannesburgers to the Paul Kruger government.

Phillips had awaited the outcome of the raid in Johannesburg, and was prepared to take part in the expected uprising. On receiving news of the raid's failure, Phillips handed himself over to the authorities on 10 January 1896 and pleaded guilty. He and the other ringleaders, including Colonel Frank Rhodes (brother of Cecil) and John Hays Hammond, were initially sentenced to death, but after six months of imprisonment most were reprieved by President Kruger and each fined £25,000. Phillips was cautioned to refrain from dabbling in politics on pain of exile, a warning which he ignored by publishing an inflammatory article in the Nineteenth Century, resulting in his being banished from the Transvaal by State Attorney Jan Smuts – Jameson and his fellow raiders were sent to London by Kruger, there to be tried by a Crown court, much to the embarrassment of all involved, while Rhodes was forced to resign as chairman of the British South Africa Company and as Cape Prime Minister. Phillips settled at and almost completely rebuilt Tylney Hall in Hampshire, England, importing a sixteenth-century ceiling from the Grimation Palace in Florence. He remained there until the end of the Boer War, when he was persuaded by Alfred Beit and Wernher to return to Johannesburg in the interests of the firm.

He was once again elected chairman of the Chamber of Mines and, in 1910, was elected to the first Union House of Assembly as a member of the Unionist Party. He was regarded as the authority on South African gold mining, and the undisputed leader and spokesman for the mining industry.

In the 1912, New Year's Honours list, Phillips was created a baronet. On 11 December 1913, he was on his way from Corner House to the Rand Club for lunch, when he was shot at five times by a certain Misnun, a trade unionist and storekeeper who had targeted Phillips because of his repeated refusal to discuss a trading issue. Phillips survived the attack and Misnun was imprisoned for 15 years, committing suicide on his release. This was not the first lucky escape that Phillips had had. Years before, during his Kimberley days, he had lost his footing and tumbled about 100 metres down the steep slopes of the diamond diggings – he survived the fall with a few scratches.

In 1914, he moved to London as managing director of the Central Mining Company and advised the British government on the metal industry during the First World War. He returned to South Africa in 1924 and settled with his family on the farm Vergelegen near Somerset West. He and his wife had two sons, Harold and Francis, and a daughter, Edith.

== Art and philanthropy ==
Lionel and Florence Phillips left South Africa a major legacy through their art collections. Florence campaigned for the founding of the Johannesburg Art Gallery and arranged its first collections, including her lace collection, while Lionel donated seven oils and a Rodin sculpture. Besides the gallery, their lasting contribution to Johannesburg was the Rand Regiments Memorial, at the Johannesburg Zoo. The Gallery and memorial were both designed by Sir Edwin Lutyens. Lionel served on the committee which planned it and paid for the "Angel of Peace" sculpture surmounting it. He revived the Witwatersrand Agricultural Society and served as its president from 1906 to 1924. He died at Vergelegen, Somerset West on 2 July 1936. He was succeeded in the baronetcy by his grandson, Sir Lionel Francis Phillips, 2nd Baronet.

== Family ==
1. Captain Harold Lionel Phillips, MBE (4 June 1886 – 22 June 1926); married 1913, Hilda Wildman Hills, of Canada.
  1. Captain Sir Lionel Francis Phillips, 2nd Bt. (9 March 1914 – 6 July 1944 Italy), killed in action in the Second World War; married Camilla Mary Parker (b. 13 February 1916), daughter of Hugh Algernon Parker and Averil Frances Tower, on 2 September 1939.
    1. Sir Robin Francis Phillips, 3rd Bt. (29 Jul 1940 - 10 Feb 2026)
2. Captain Francis Rudolph Phillips, MC (11 April 1883 – 24 June 1942); married Eileen Cecily Mander, OBE.
3. Edith Minnie Phillips, married firstly 1912, Lt-Col. John Stuart Wortley; married secondly 1919, William Nicholson (artist).

== Biographies ==
Fraser, Maryna (1986). SOME REMINISCENCES, LIONEL PHILLIPS. Craighall: AD Donker. ISBN 9780868520940.

== Sources ==
- Standard Encyclopaedia of Southern Africa vol. 8 (NASOU 1973) ISBN 0-625-00324-1

== External links and references ==
- Fraser, Maryna. "Phillips, Sir Lionel". Oxford Dictionary of National Biography (online ed.). Oxford University Press. doi:10.1093/ref:odnb/39343. (Subscription, Wikipedia Library access or UK public library membership required.)
- Parktown Heritage
- Vergelegen/Lady Phillips
- Johannesburg Art Gallery
- Sunday Times article

Baronetage of the United Kingdom
New creation	Baronet (of Tylney Hall); 1912–1936	Succeeded by Lionel Phillips
