= George Albu =

Mining magnate in South Africa's diamond and gold industries

Sir George Albu Bt.
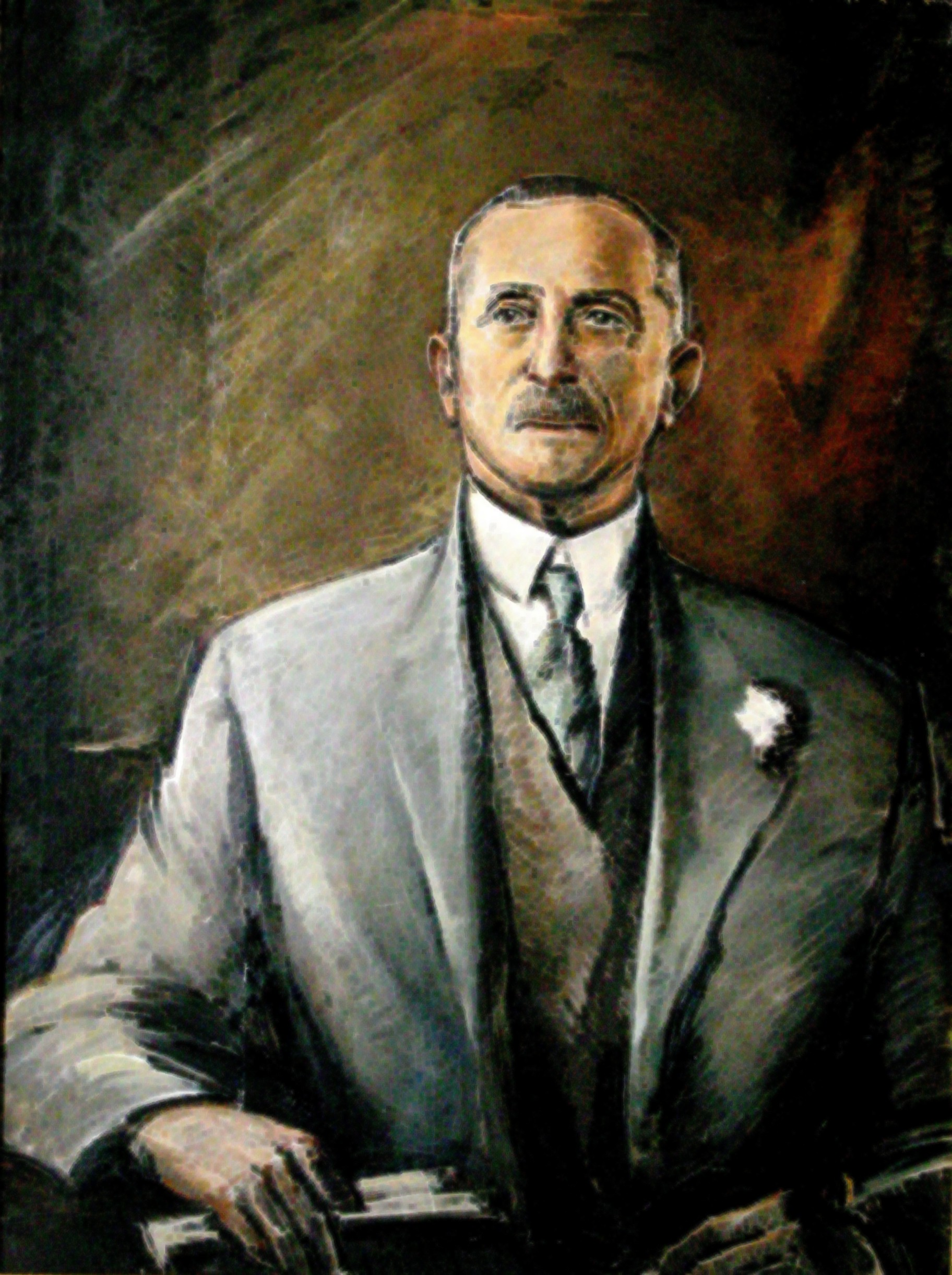
- Born: 26 October 1857; Brandenburg, Germany
- Died: 27 December 1935 (aged 78)

Sir George Albu, 1st Baronet (26 October 1857 – 27 December 1935) was a mining magnate in the diamond and gold industries of South Africa.

== Biography ==
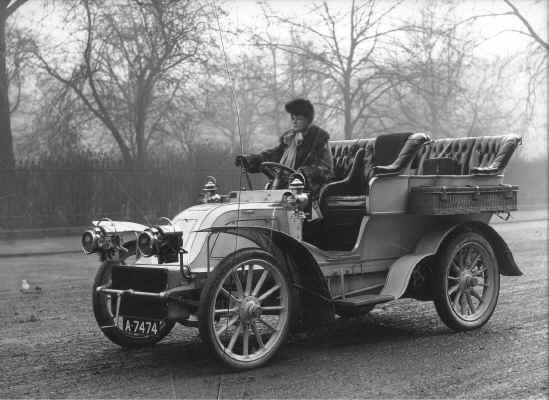
Lady Albu at wheel of CGV, London April 1905

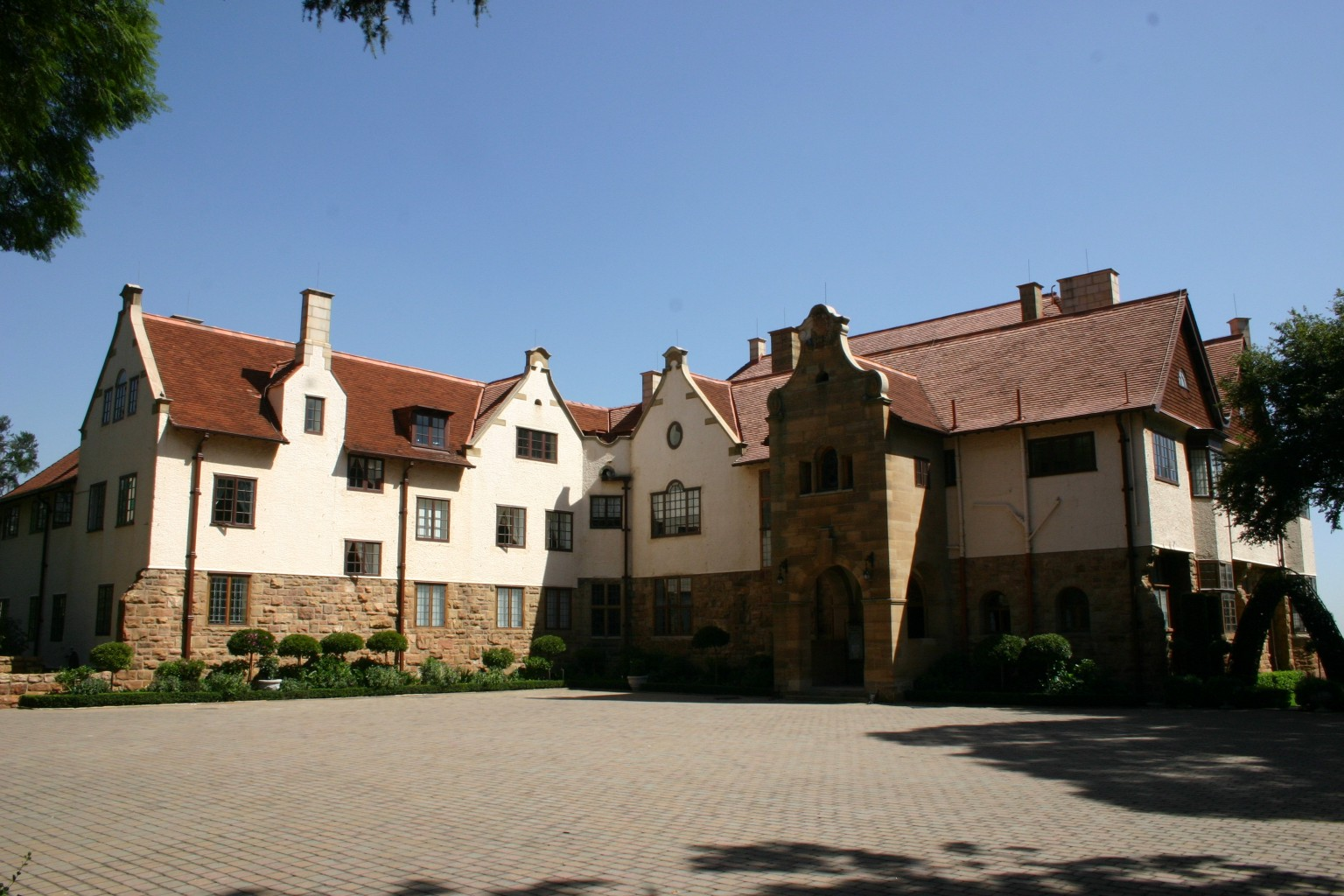
Northwards, Johannesburg 26.17720S, 28.03650E

George Albu was born in Berlin, Kingdom of Prussia in 1857. The son of Simon Albu (26 February 1830 – 26 February 1911) and Fanny Sternberg (d. 24 October 1912), George and his brother Leopold were German Jews who emigrated to Cape Colony in 1876. On arrival in Cape Town, George became an assistant at the haberdashery counter in Stuttafords. After some time in Cape Town, they moved to the diamond-fields of Kimberley, accumulated financial interests, and sold out to De Beers at a substantial profit, before settling on the Witwatersrand and becoming a naturalized Transvaal citizen in 1887. George Albu purchased the ailing Meyer and Charlton Mine, restructured it, and on 30 December 1895 he and his brother established General Mining and Finance Corporation. Naturalized as a UK citizen in 1911, he was created 1st Baronet Albu of Johannesburg on 12 February 1912 — at that time baronetcies were bestowed on a large number of Randlords. In 1911 Sir George Albu bought the Parktown mansion, Northwards, (designed by Herbert Baker in 1904) for £12,000 (Colonel John Dale Lace and wife Josephine, the previous owners, had paid £21 000 for the house). He held the office of Danish General Consul to Johannesburg in 1913 and was decorated with the Order of the Dannebrog.

In the 1960s and 1970s General Mining and Finance Corporation merged with Federale Mynbou and Union Corporation, became Gencor, then Billiton, then BHP Billiton, one of the largest mining houses in the world, with interests in Borneo, China, Australia, South America and South Africa. Together with Cecil John Rhodes, Barney Barnato, Alfred Beit and others, the Albu brothers belonged to the wealthy and influential Randlord set. He died in Johannesburg in 1935.

== Family ==
George Albu (1857–1935) married Gertrude Frederike Alice Rosendorff (d. 18 April 1950), daughter of Max Rosendorff and Emilie, on 9 December 1888. They produced six children:

1. Charlotte Frederike Albu d. 28 Nov 1965 with no issue. On 5 September 1933 married Rt. Rev. Wilfred Parker b. 23 January 1883, d. 22 June 1966.
2. Katherine Victoria Albu. Married in 1913 to Erroll Gordon Hay d. 2 November 1964.
3. Alice Ernestine Albu. On 4 September 1924 married Captain Nigel James Bengough. Flying Corps in the First World War.
  1. Sir Piers Henry George Bengough b. 24 May 1929 d. 18 April 2005. OBE 1973, KCVO 1986. Lieutenant-Colonel in The Royal Hussars. In 1952 married Bridget Adams (International Figure Skating Champion 1949). They had two sons.
4. Captain Walter George Albu b. 23 Jul 1892, d. 29 May 1920. Fought in the First World War. Lieutenant in Royal Irish Fusiliers (Special Reserve). Captain in Royal Air Force. Order of St. Stanislaus of Russia, Croix de Guerre (avec palmes)
5. Irene Elsie Albu b. 9 Jun 1900, d. 24 Jun 1924. On 7 September 1923 married William Dalrymple, son of Sir William Dalrymple.
6. Sir George Werner Albu, 2nd Bt. b. 3 Sep 1905, d. 18 Feb 1963 married Kathleen Betty Dicey d. 19 February 1956
  1. Georgina Albu b. 9 Feb 1930, d. 8 Aug 1981
  2. Susan Nomakepu Albu b. 8 Jun 1932, d. 7 Oct 2011
  3. Julia Mary Albu b. 13 Jun 1937
  4. Caroline Albu b. 10 Jun 1943 married a Lorentz
  5. Sir George Albu, 3rd Bt. b. 5 June 1944 married Joan Valerie Millar, daughter of Malcom Millar, on 23 April 1969. Michaelhouse School, Cedara Agricultural College, London Tutorial College, South African Light Horse Regiment. Residence (2003) Glen Hamish Farm, Richmond, Natal
  6. Camilla Jane Albu b. 22 Aug 1972 Durban. On 4 May 1996 married Gary Neilsen
  7. Victoria Mary Albu b. 14 Jan 1976 Durban. On 15 Jan 2005 married Willie-James Ward

Baronetage of the United Kingdom
New creation	Baronet (of Grosvenor Place and of Johannesburg); 1912–1935	Succeeded by George Werner Albu
