= Florence, Lady Phillips =

South African art patroness

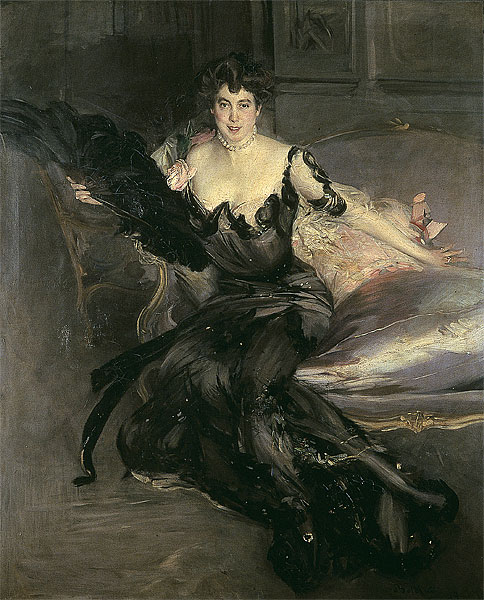
Florence, Lady Phillips by 1903 Oil on canvas 193 x 155 cm by Giovanni Boldini (1842 – 1931) Dublin City Gallery, The Hugh Lane

Dorothea Sarah Florence Alexandra, Lady Phillips (née Ortlepp; 14 June 1863 – 23 August 1940) was a South African art patroness and promoter of indigenous culture. She was married to Sir Lionel Phillips, 1st Baronet, a mining magnate and politician and was known by one of her middle names, Florence.

== Early life ==
Florence Ortlepp was born in Cape Town in 1863, the only daughter of Albert Frederick Ortlepp, a Colesberg land surveyor and naturalist, and Sarah Walker. She received her education at Rondebosch and later in Bloemfontein. Lionel Phillips met her on the diamond-diggings and married her in 1885. They moved to Johannesburg in 1889 during the early days of the city's gold rush. She travelled extensively from 1887, but returned hurriedly to be with her husband during his trial following the Jameson Raid. After his sentence, reprieve and exile, they left for London and established a home in Grosvenor Square while maintaining a country house at Tylney Hall in Hampshire. While the couple lived in London, Florence acquired a keen interest in art and bought numerous works by artists of the time, including William Orpen, William Rothenstein, Walter Sickert, Philip Wilson Steer, Camille Pissarro, Claude Monet and Alfred Sisley. She presented many of these works to the Johannesburg Art Gallery, which she actively helped to establish.

On a visit to South Africa in 1905, she commissioned Rudolf Marloth to undertake his Flora of South Africa, a mammoth work published in six volumes between 1913 and 1932.

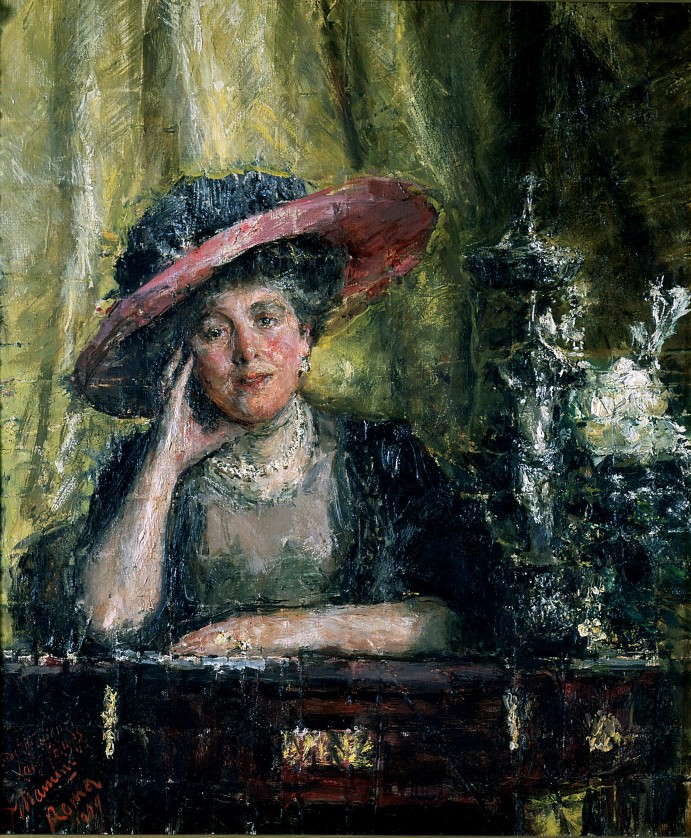
Lady Phillips 1909 Oil on canvas 89 x 75 cm by Antonio Mancini (1852 - 1930) Courtesy Johannesburg Art Gallery

== Art collection ==
After resettling in Johannesburg, she started acquiring paintings with a view to eventually founding an art gallery, which after many difficulties took shape as the Johannesburg Art Gallery. She played a leading role in projects aimed at cultivating and preserving the local artistic heritage. She persuaded Sir Max Michaelis to donate his considerable collection of 17th century Dutch and Flemish paintings to the city of Cape Town. She headed a movement to preserve and restore the Koopmans-De Wet House in Cape Town and was an enthusiastic collector of Africana furniture, both for her own home and public institutions. She was instrumental, with Prof. G.E. Pearse, in establishing a Faculty of Architecture at the University of the Witwatersrand.

== Literary output ==
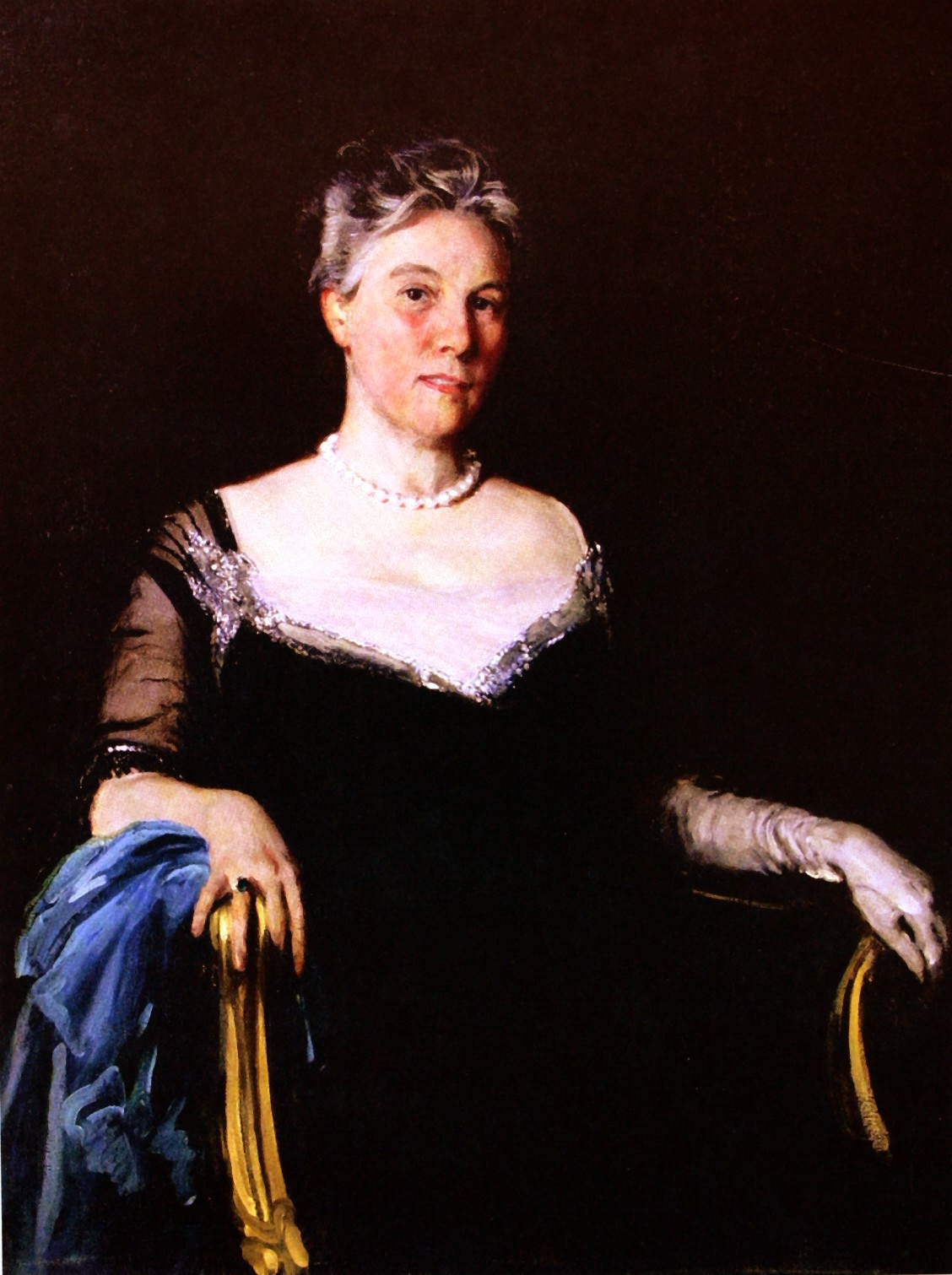
Florence, Lady Phillips c1910 by Sir William Nicholson (1872-1949) Oil on canvas 112 x 92 cm. Johannesburg Art Gallery

In 1913, her book "A Friendly Germany: Why Not?" was published pleading for friendly relations between England and Germany. She was of the opinion that Britain and Germany should unite against the self-determination movement amongst the Asians and Africans, which she referred to as "The Black and the Yellow Perils".

== Later life ==
Florence and Lionel Phillips eventually settled at the farm Vergelegen near Somerset West in 1924. Here they devoted their spare time to encouraging the preservation of national heritage culture and artefacts. They also sponsored immigrants through the 1820 Settlers Memorial Association and a number of other public causes. Many of the Randlords and their wives commissioned portraits of themselves from leading European society portraitists of the time. The living room of the Vergelegen Manor House is adorned by a youthful and opulent portrayal of Florence by the Italian artist Giovanni Boldini, while a more mature and sombre rendering by the British portraitist Sir William Nicholson is to be seen in the Music Room. The Boldini portrait was presented by Lady Phillips to the SA National Gallery in the 1930s.

She died in 1940 at Vergelegen, Somerset West. She and her husband are buried in the Brixton Cemetery in Johannesburg. They had two sons and a daughter.

== Sources ==
- Standard Encyclopaedia of Southern Africa vol. 8 (NASOU 1973) ISBN 0-625-00324-1

== External links and references ==
- Parktown Heritage
- Vergelegen/Lady Phillips
- Johannesburg Art Gallery
- Sunday Times article
- SA National Gallery article
- 13, April 1913 NY Times Review of "A Friendly Germany: Why Not?"
- 25, May 1913 NY Times Review of "A Friendly Germany: Why Not?"
