= John Dale Lace =

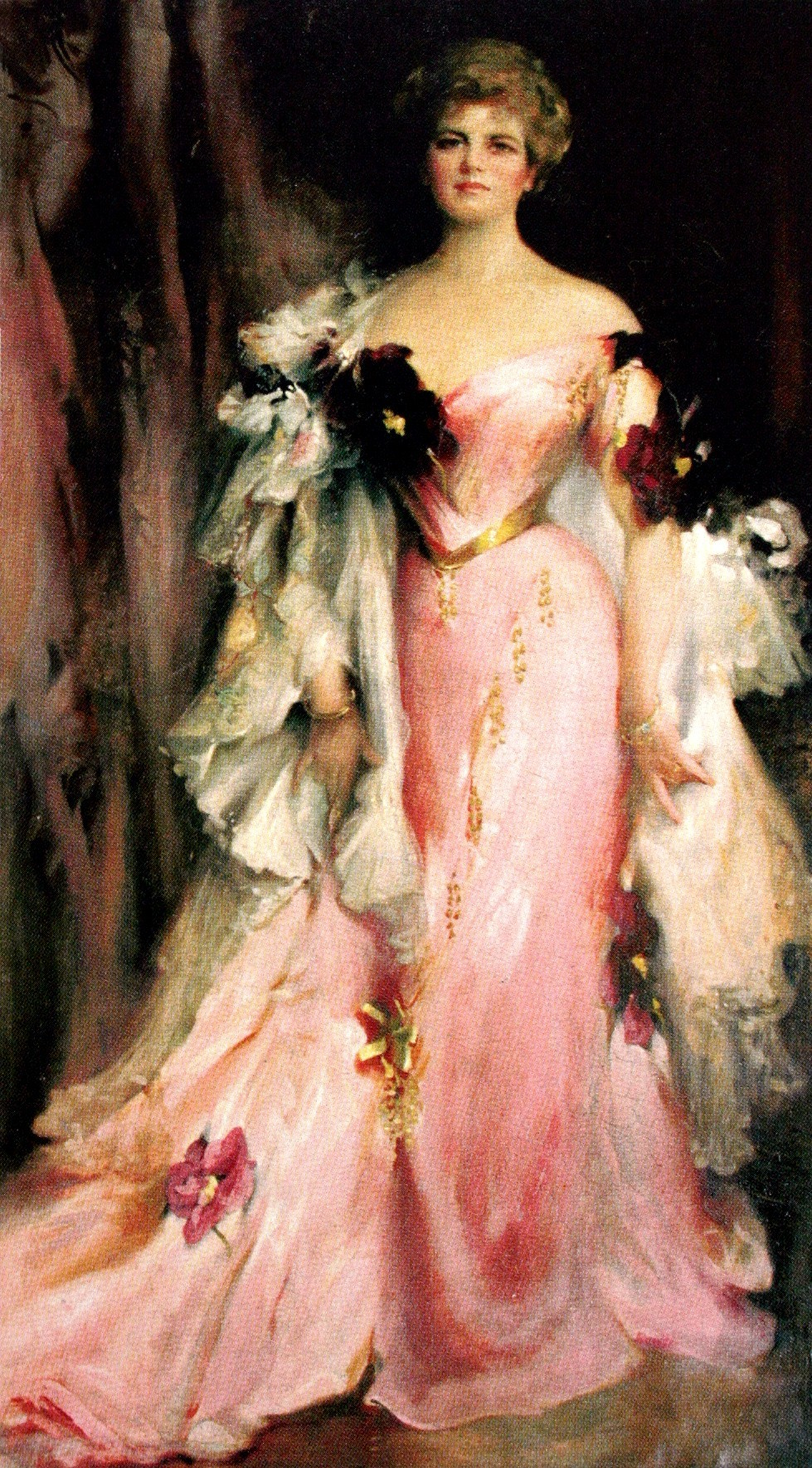
Josephine Dale Lace

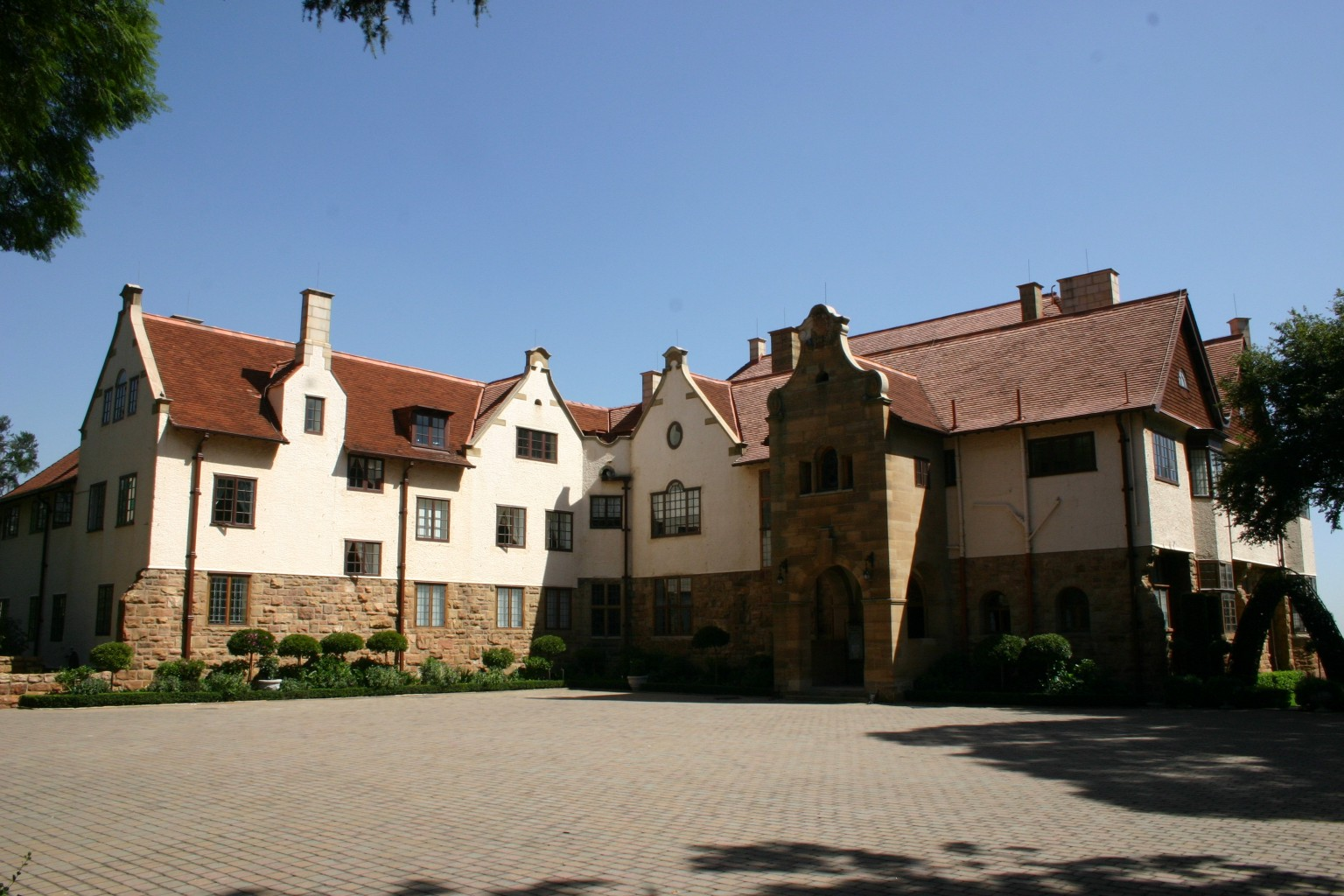
Northwards

Colonel John Dale Lace (27 November 1859 – 5 June 1937) was a South African gold and diamond mining magnate and Randlord. He was born in Port St Mary on the Isle of Man.

== Career ==
Dale Lace came to South Africa as an employee of the Bank of Africa. Dale Lace built a fortune in the diamond industry. He would depart Kimberley for the Witwatersrand Goldfields. During 1895 until 1896, he was a member of the Johannesburg Reform Committee agitating for better rights for Uitlanders in the South African Republic. A consequence of this action resulted in the Jameson Raid and would accompany a British Agent with a message to the raiders expressing the Colonial Secretary's disapproval of the raid. When the raid failed, he was one of many of the Committee arrested, tried and found guilty but escaped jail with the payment of a £2,000 fine. After the British victory in the Second Boer War, he was appointed as a Councillor on the first Johannesburg Town Council and he was among the founders of the Transvaal Political Association in Johannesburg in October 1902. The association later became the Transvaal Responsible Government Association, which worked for Responsible government until it was granted in 1906. He was also a founding member of the Wanderer's Club in Johannesburg.

== Family ==
He was twice married to Josephine Cornelia Brink (Jose) from Richmond in the Karoo, who died 14 May 1937. Jose was a flamboyant Johannesburg socialite who was often seen in a carriage drawn by a team of zebras. John met and married Jose for the first time when she was in London pursuing an acting career. It is believed that she was proposed to by Cecil John Rhodes, prime minister of the Cape at the time, and was mistress to King Edward VII. It is known that she was mistress to another man Ernest Beckett, 2nd Baron Grimthorpe, with whom she had a son, although she claimed it was Edward VII's son.

The second time, after Ernest Beckett declined to marry her, she and John married in Cape Town and John adopted her son. They never had children of their own.

The Dale Laces were owners of one of Johannesburg's most prominent historic landmarks, the Parktown mansion 'Northwards', designed by British architect Herbert Baker in 1904.

Just as the gold-mining industry was booming, the diamond market was being monopolised by De Beers, which went on to become the world’s largest diamond company - the dissipation of the Dale Lace fortune coincided with a devastating fire at 'Northwards', and in 1912, the charred remains of the house were sold to George Albu. John Dale Lace lost his fortune and he and Jose went to live at Boschkop (now Randpark Ridge), northwest of Johannesburg. A gold mine, Lace Propriety Mines Limited, was named after him, as was a road, Dale Lace Avenue, in Randpark Ridge.
