= Charlotte Maxeke Johannesburg Academic Hospital =

Coordinates: 26°10′36.42″S 28°02′33.34″E

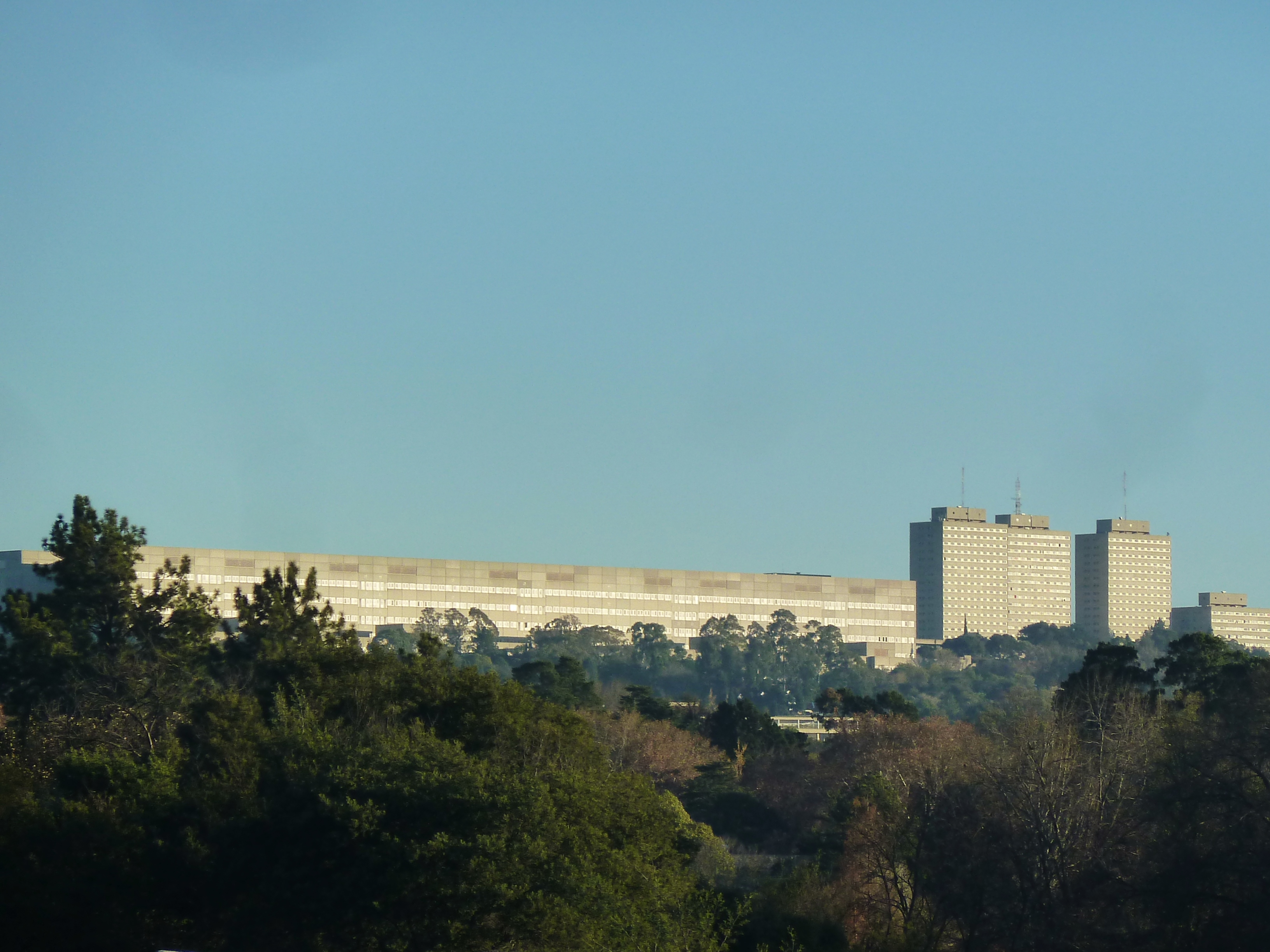
- Charlotte Maxeke Johannesburg Academic Hospital

Geography
- Location: Parktown, Johannesburg, Gauteng, South Africa

Organisation
- Care system: Public
- Type: District General, Teaching
- Affiliated university: University of the Witwatersrand

Services
- Emergency department: Yes
- Beds: 1088

History
- Opened: 1979

Links
- Lists: Hospitals in South Africa

The Charlotte Maxeke Johannesburg Academic Hospital is an accredited general hospital in Parktown, Johannesburg, Gauteng, South Africa.

== History ==
=== Background ===
The land on Parktown ridge where the future hospital was built was at one time owned by Otto Beit. He donated the 22 ha of land and its Hohenheim residence in 1915 to the Johannesburg General Hospital, at that time based in Hillbrow. Apart from the Otto Beit Convalescent Home and Baumann Convalescent Home for Babies, built in 1938, the rest of the land was unused. In October 1968, the Transvaal Provincial Authority and the University of the Witwatersrand announced that the site would be the choice for a new academic teaching hospital for Johannesburg. The proposal was for a 2,000-bed hospital with residential housing for 1,500 nurses and training facilities for 200 final year medical students and academic staff.

=== Design ===
==== Hospital ====
The plan consisted of twin North and South complexes, 370 metres long and 90 metres wide, divided into five hospital blocks. The two complexes were divided by a wide enclosed walkway named Hospital Street that contained the lifts, public and staff facilities, cafes, post office, bank, chapel, library, and childcare centre. Parking areas were to be located below the hospital. Levels 0 to 4 consisted of access and service tunnels and parking areas. Levels 5, 7, 9, 11, and 13 were to be service levels while level 16 was to be a technical area. Levels 6 and 8 were to be medical treatment areas and 10, 12 and 14 were nursing wards.

==== Medical school ====
This area was to consist of three buildings. A two-storey teaching area with contact with patients, a four-storey science teaching block, and a four-storey university administration and library block.

==== Nurses residence ====
Plan called for five eight to eighteen storey buildings for accommodating 1500 nurses, with gardens, dining and assembly halls, and recreation areas.

=== Construction ===
The project went out to tender during November 1971 and two tenders were received. Neither were accepted but negotiations took place with the two tenderers. The contract was awarded on 21 August 1972 to a consortium of contractors consisting of German, Italian and South African firms of Hochtief, Impresa Ing. F Federici, Impress Italiane All’Esterc Impresit, Concor, Combrink, and Prodilog Construction. The contract was worth R72,463,000 with a completion date in 81 months. Initially the construction was to be a steel frame building but the main consortium member convinced the client of a concrete frame, precast, prestressed and post-tensioned structure, built a Chloorkop and an onsite factory in Parktown resulting in a faster and cheaper construction. The initial cost was reduced by 25%. 167 cubic metres of the Parktown ridge was blasted and 250,000 cubic metres of earth moved.

=== Opening ===
The main structure was opened in 1979.

=== Size and capability ===
Currently the facility has 1,088 usable beds. The hospital's professional and support staff exceeds 4,000 people.

=== Issues ===
In 2012 the Sunday Times of South Africa reported on a critical shortage of equipment and manpower that compromised medical care. In 2022 the hospital was over R200 million in arrears with its bills for municipal services.

=== 2021 fire ===
The hospital's parking structure caught on fire on the morning of 17 April 2021. The fire started in a storeroom for dry surgical supplies, according to officials. Flames were thought to have been extinguished but reignited later that same day, collapsing the third level of the parking garage. This necessitated the evacuation and closure of the hospital for seven days. The fire destroyed an estimated R40 million worth of medical stock and personal protective equipment.

The following month, it was revealed that although the hospital did not comply with fire safety standards, it had passed a fitness audit earlier in the year. Johannesburg's Emergency Management Services claimed that the firefighting equipment inside the hospital had no water although the Gauteng health department claimed that the provincial Department of Infrastructure had audited the building in late 2020. Smoke doors, used to prevent the spread of smoke in a building in the event of a fire, had been recommissioned because their magnets had stopped working; fire hydrant couplings had been stolen and so were not compatible with the fire hoses on fire engines; fire suppression systems were not working; and fire exits had been locked due to security concerns. It was later discovered that the hospital had not been evaluated for fire safety since 2017, four years prior to the fire.

While the building underwent assessments and awaited compliance certificates in May, R30 million worth of copper piping that made up its water systems was stolen, and televisions in the paediatric oncology unit were also taken.

The oncology unit was the first to reopen on 28 June 2021.

== Training ==
It is also the main teaching hospital for the University of the Witwatersrand, faculty of Health Sciences. The institution provides the service base for undergraduate and post-graduate training in all areas of health professions.

The joint staff produces research and collaborates with several universities on the continent and abroad. The hospital offers tertiary, secondary and highly specialized services.

The costs of providing these services to the population of Gauteng Province, in addition to the neighbouring provinces, are funded by a National Tertiary Services Grant, as well as Provincial allocation.

The hospital also serves as a referral hospital for a number of hospitals in its referral chain.

== Clinical departments ==
- Nursing
- Department Medicine
  - Cardiology
  - Neurology
  - Pulmonology
  - Haemotology and Oncology
  - Dermatology
  - Gastroenterology
  - Geriatrics
  - Family Health
  - Nephrology
  - Hepatology
  - Endocrinology
- Department of Surgery
  - Otorhinolaryngology
  - Paediatric surgery
  - Urology
  - Trauma Unit
  - Plastic and Reconstructive surgery
  - Cardiothoracic surgery
  - Maxillo-facial and Oral surgery
  - Neurosurgery
  - Vascular Surgery
- Department of Nuclear Medicine
- Department of Orthopaedics
- Department of Ophthalmology
- Department of Anaesthesia
- Department of Radiation Therapy
- Department of Paediatrics and Child Health
- Department of Radiology – Diagnostics
- Department of Obstetrics and Gynaecology
- Department of Psychiatry and Mental Health

== Allied medical departments ==
- Dietary Services
- Occupational Therapy
- Pharmacy
- Podiatry
- Physiotherapy
- Speech Therapy & Audiology
- Social Work
- Clinical Psychology
- Clinical Technology

== Coat of arms ==
The hospital registered a coat of arms at the Bureau of Heraldry in 1980 : Azure, on a Latin cross nowy, the arms potent and the foot throughout, Argent, a pomme charged with a gold stamp Or, between on the arms three potents and on the foot a rod of Aesculapius, Vert, the rod entwined of a serpent Or.

== Remedial works ==
Following a major fire in April 2021 that damaged parts of the facility, remedial works are underway at the Charlotte Maxeke Johannesburg Academic Hospital. The initiative is a collaboration between the Development Bank of Southern Africa (DBSA) and the Gauteng Department of Health (GDoH).

The project focuses on restoring Blocks 4/5 North, the section most affected by the fire, to full operational capacity. The scope of work includes structural repairs, reinstatement of building services, demolition and reconstruction of damaged areas, and compliance with national building regulations (SANS 10400) and procurement guidelines (FIDPM).

The DBSA appointed the Henry Fagan Health Consortium in November 2023 to lead the implementation, with Gwendie Drury serving as the project manager. The programme is structured in seven stages, from initiation through design, construction, and final handover.

The estimated project value is R240 million, and work is being coordinated with the broader hospital-wide fire compliance upgrades planned for subsequent phases.
