= Herbert Baker =

English architect (1862–1946)

Sir Herbert Baker
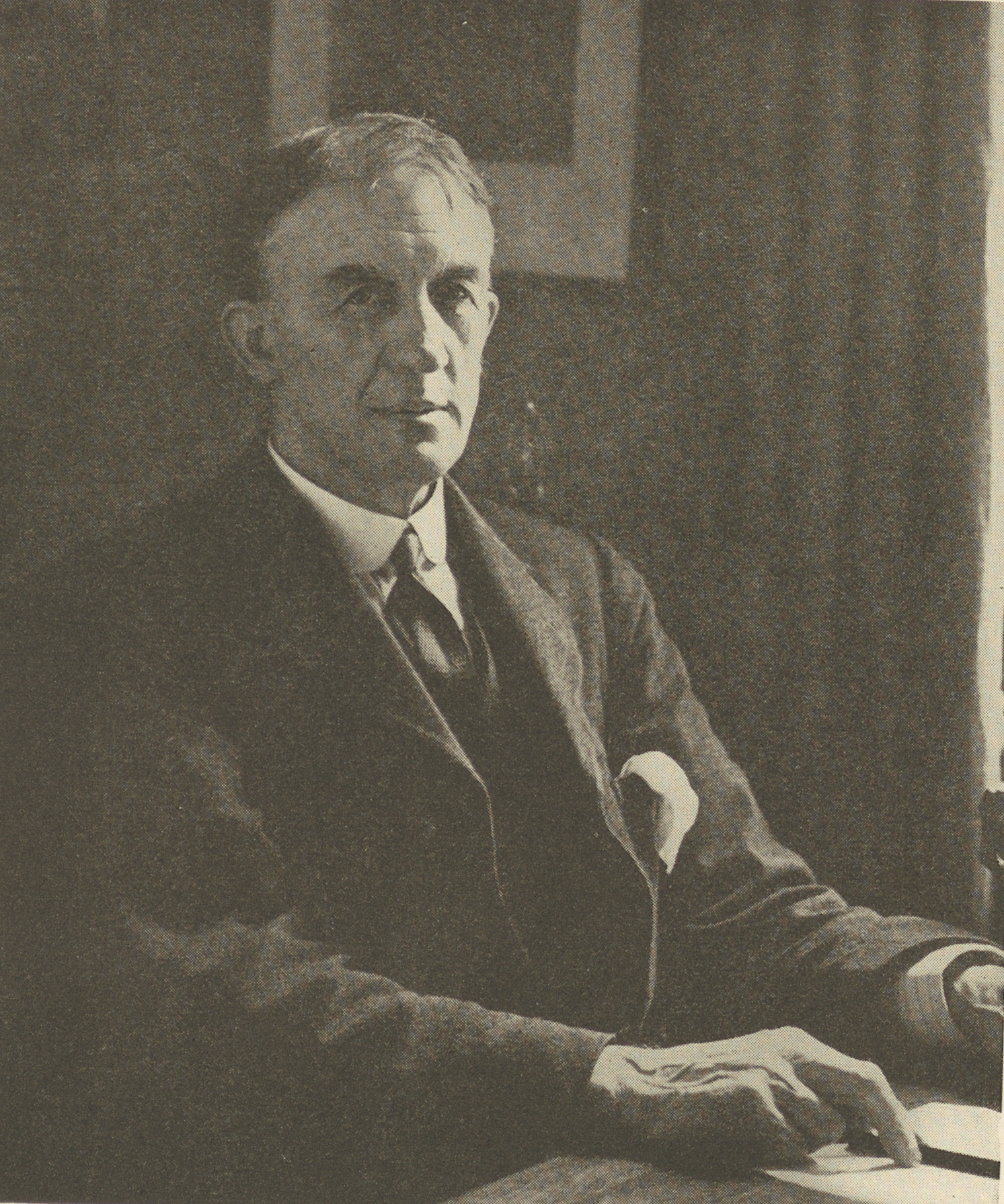
- Born: 9 June 1862; Cobham, Kent, England
- Died: 4 February 1946 (aged 83); Cobham, Kent, England
- Resting place: Westminster Abbey
- Education: Royal Academy Schools; Architectural Association School
- Occupation: Architect
- Awards: Doctor of Architecture honoris causa Doctor of Civil Law honoris causa
- Buildings: Bank of England; India House, London; South Africa House; Union Buildings Pretoria, Secretariat Building, New Delhi

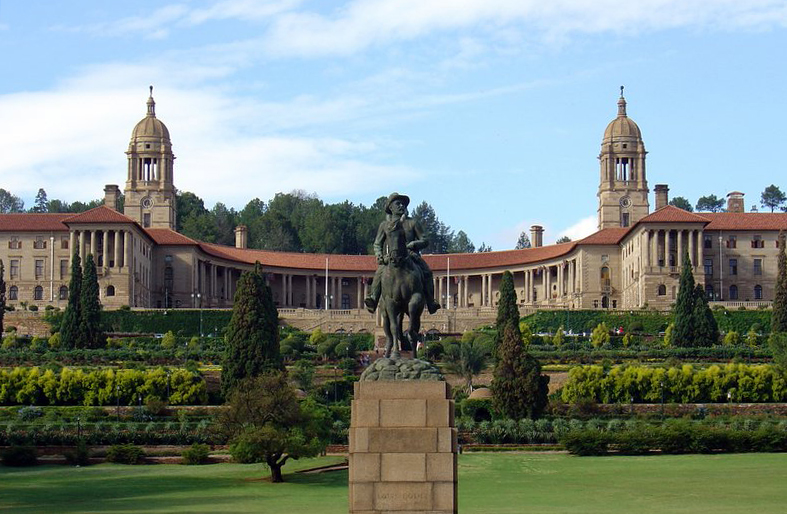
The Union Buildings, Pretoria

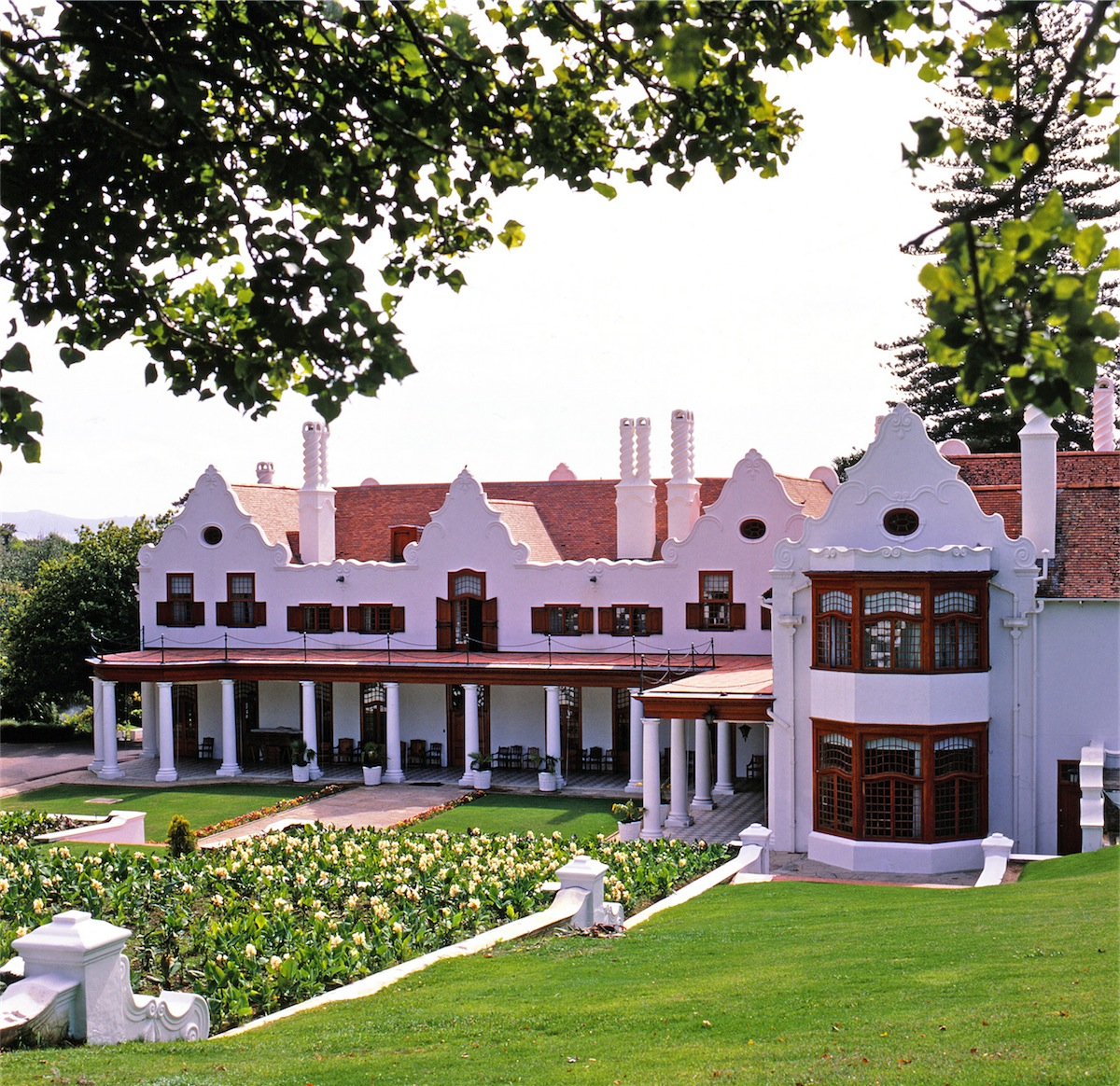
Groote Schuur

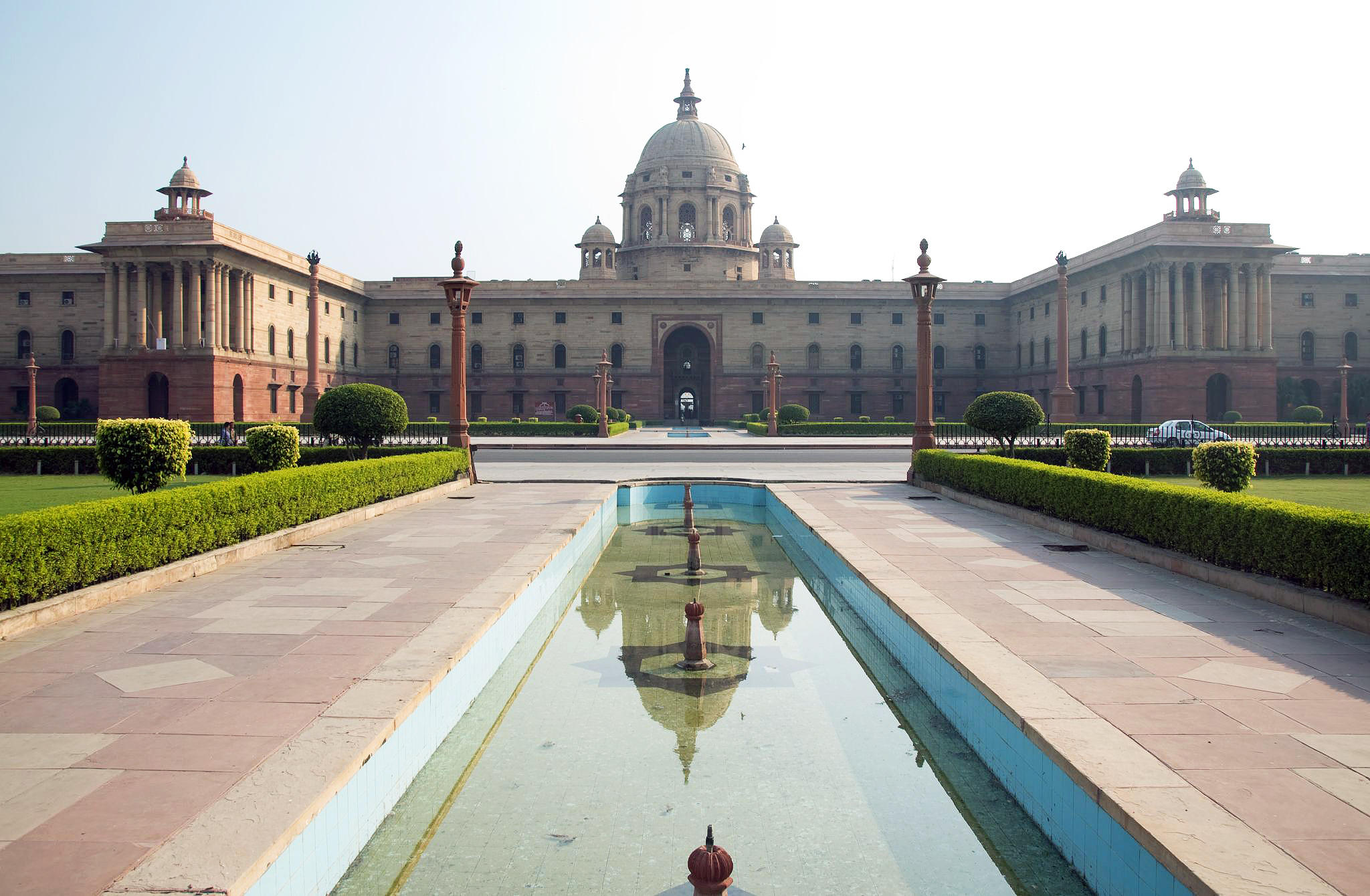
The Secretariat North Block, New Delhi

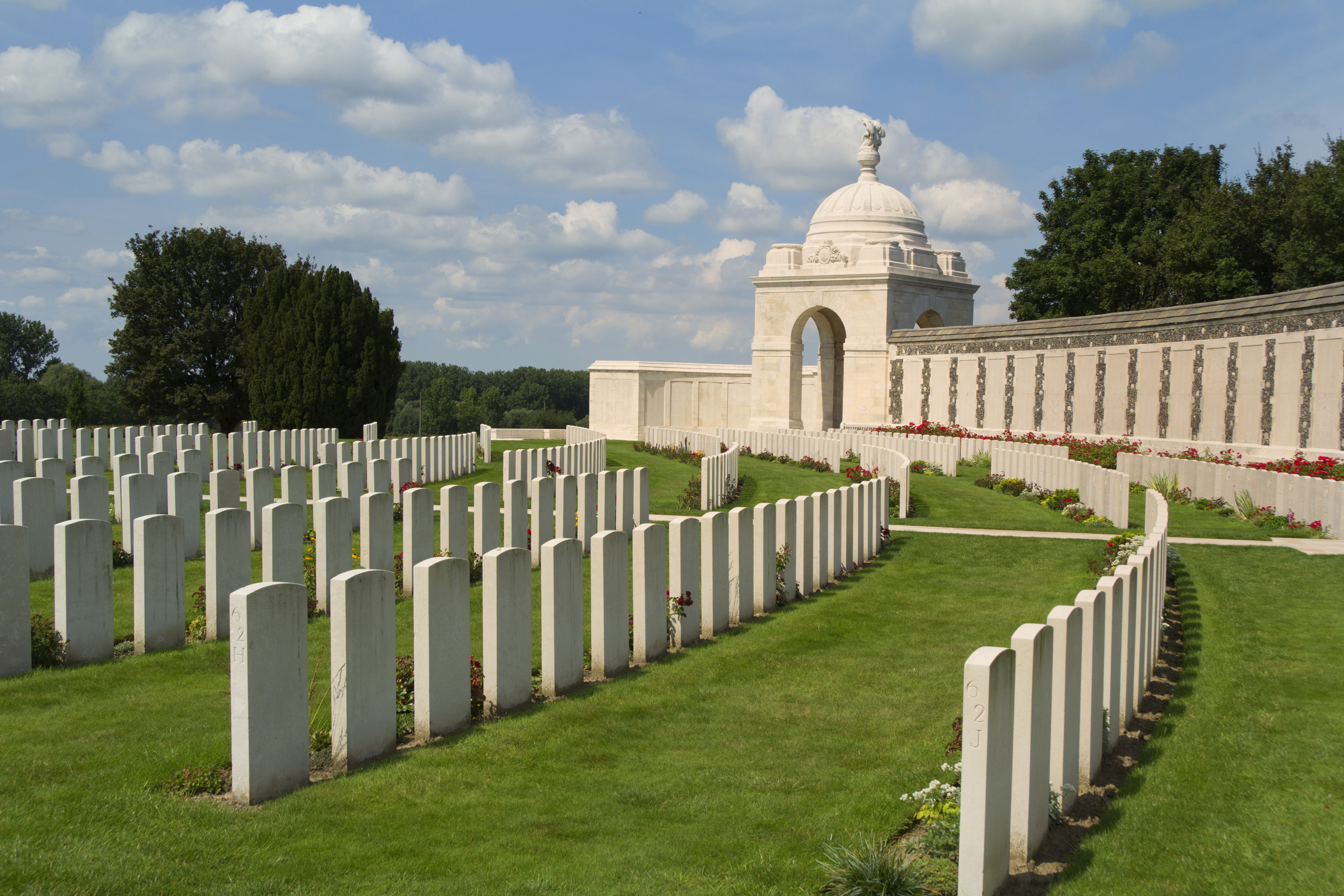
Tyne Cot Cemetery

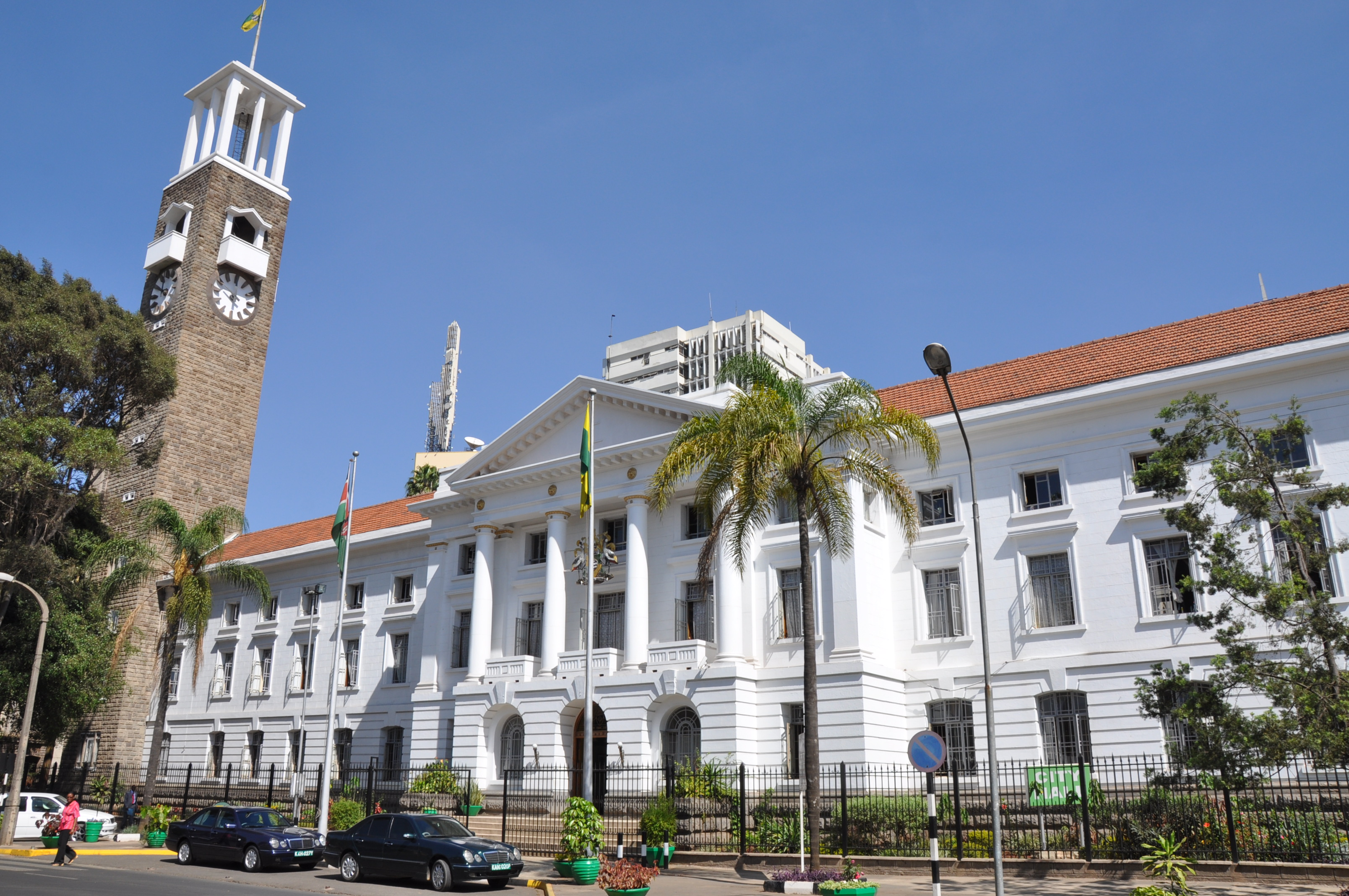
Nairobi City Hall

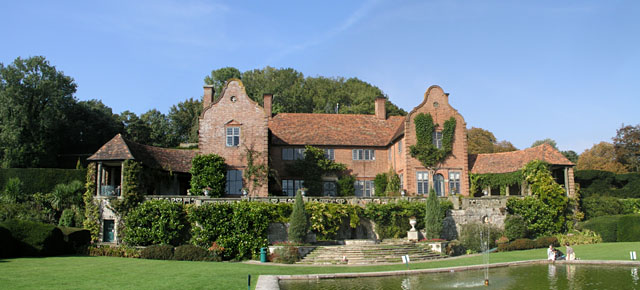
Port Lympne Mansion

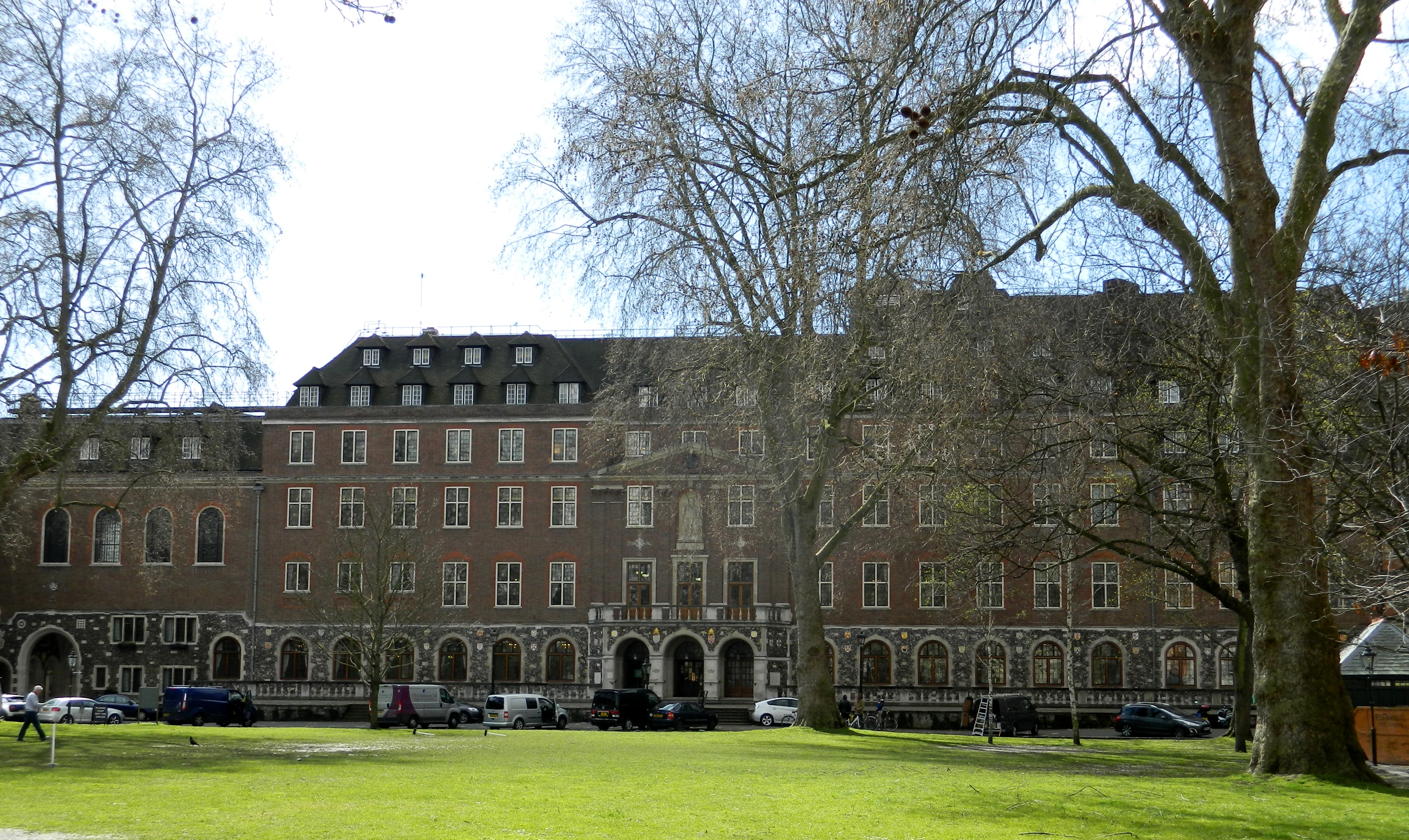
Church House, Westminster

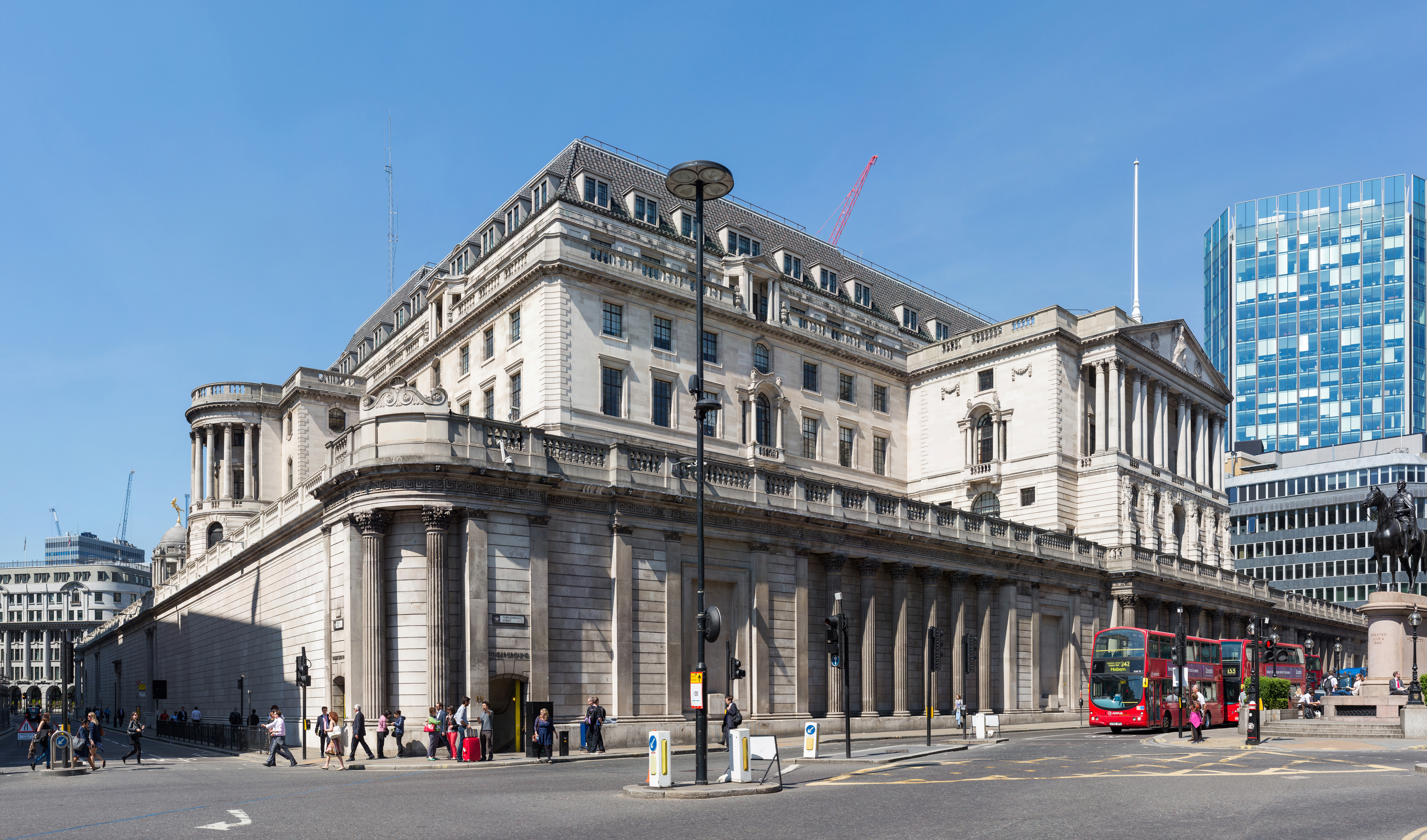
The Bank of England

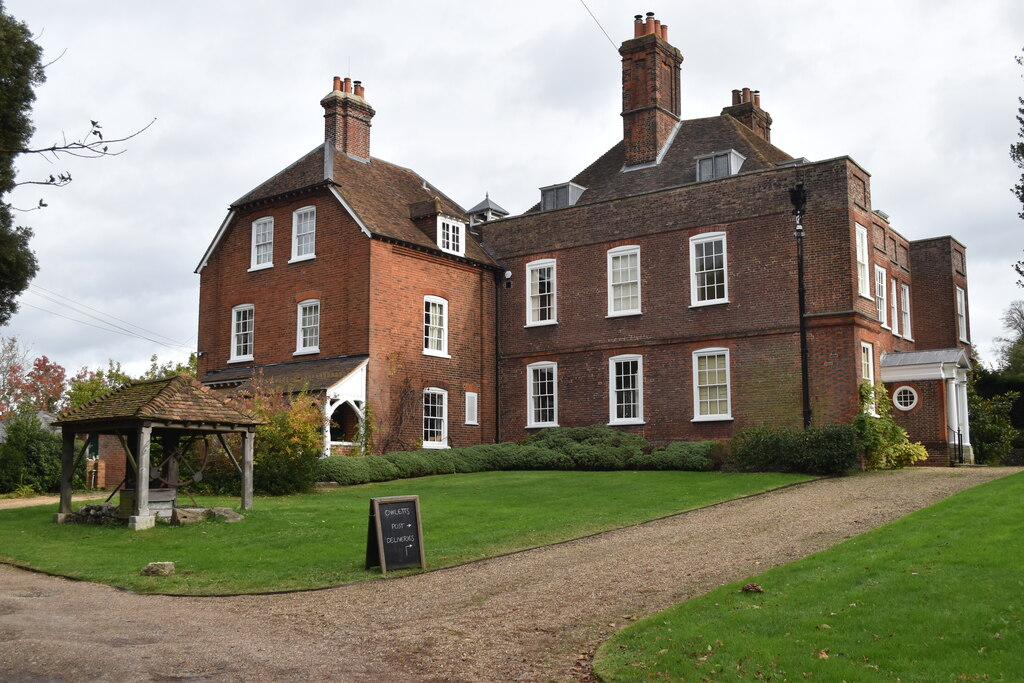
Owletts

Sir Herbert Baker FRIBA, Hon. DArch. Hon DCL (9 June 1862 – 4 February 1946) was an English architect remembered as the dominant force in South African architecture, developing a Neo-Classical style which interacted theatrically with the landscape, and which projected Imperial strength and permanence. He was the most prominent and prolific architect of his generation.

== Early life and education ==
Baker was born at the country house Owletts, one of nine children of Thomas Henry Baker (1824–1904), J.P., a gentleman farmer and director of the Kent Fire and Life Insurance Company, and his wife Frances Davis. He was profoundly influenced by the stone construction used in Norman cathedrals and Anglo-Saxon churches in Kent, as is apparent in the churches, schools and houses he later designed.

He was educated at Tonbridge School. In 1879 he was articled to his cousin, architect Arthur Baker, while attending classes at the Architectural Association School and the Royal Academy Schools, where Edwin Lutyens was a classmate. He worked with Arthur Baker on St Padarn's Church, Llanberis in Wales, then went to work in the offices of Ernest George and Harold Peto. In 1890, Baker passed his examination for Associateship of the Royal Institute of British Architects and was awarded the Ashpitel Prize for being top of his class in 1889.

In 1891, Baker's father invested in a fruit farm in South Africa and his brother Lionel moved there to manage it. Herbert went with him, to help establish the place. The fruit farm was part of a parcel owned by Cecil Rhodes, whose new home Groote Schuur, had been destroyed by fire. Rhodes and Baker immediately became friends and Rhodes asked Baker to rebuild the house. Baker fully embraced the Cape vernacular, but Rhodes had Baker in mind for other projects and wanted him to establish a formal architectural language for public buildings. To that end, in 1900, he sent Baker on a tour of archaeological sites in Italy, Egypt and Greece; this tour forever changed Baker's approach to design. It also led to the establishment of the Baker Traveling Scholarship, which Baker created in 1911 to send promising South African architects to study in Greece and Italy. Rhodes' patronage also cemented Baker's reputation, and career. Over the next two decades, he would build some of the grandest houses, and public buildings, in the country.

== Career ==
=== South Africa ===
In 1893, Baker was named Diocesan architect for Cape Town and built several churches; he also acted as the project architect for the English firm Dunn & Watson, overseeing their Cape Town projects. In 1899, he formed a partnership with his former Royal Academy classmate, Francis Edward Masey. The firm, Baker & Masey, designed numerous buildings; many Cape Town-area buildings attributed to Baker before 1910 were actually by Masey. Also during this time, Baker and Masey designed several buildings in Rhodesia, although complete records are unavailable.

After Rhodes died in 1902, and as the Boer War was ending, High Commissioner Alfred Milner asked Baker to move to Johannesburg to help with post-war construction. This made Baker a member of 'Milner's Kindergarten', a group of British civil servants that Milner established to build and manage the colony. From Johannesburg, Baker co-managed Baker & Masey; in Johannesburg, he formed Baker, Masey & Sloper with the architect E.W. Sloper, who had been his assistant in Cape Town. In 1906, Sloper left South Africa and Baker partnered with Francis Fleming to form Baker & Fleming; in Cape Town, Franklin Kaye Kendall was added as a partner to form Baker & Kendall. In 1915, James Morris was added to form Baker, Kendall & Morris. Baker formally withdrew from this firm in 1918, but by then he was no longer in South Africa. Pretoria was to become the administrative centre for the new government of the Union of South Africa and, in 1909, Baker was commissioned to design the Government Building. He created the grand Union Buildings. In 1912, once they were complete, he left South Africa, designing buildings, and/or approving designs, from afar.

=== India ===
In 1911, King George V announced that the capital of India would be moved from Calcutta to the more central city of Delhi. The Viceroy struck a committee to organize the move and new construction. Baker's old friend, Edwin Lutyens, won the contract to design the government buildings and residences, but the committee felt he needed a collaborator. Baker was now famous throughout the British Empire and the Union Buildings were what the committee had in mind. Hearing this, Baker quickly wrote an article for The Times, saying that the project should embody the ideal of British rule in India, and that the buildings should blend Grecian and Roman architecture with Indian architecture and symbols. Baker was invited to be Lutyens' collaborator.

It was agreed that Lutyens would handle the design for the city's lay-out, the Viceroy's House and the war memorial, India Gate. Baker would design the Secretariat Building and the MPs bungalows; together, they would build the Parliament Building. Their fee was 5% of the total cost of the project. Lutyens arrived in Calcutta in 1912; Baker went on an architectural tour of Italy and arrived in Calcutta in 1913.

While the two men were old friends, they would have a bitter falling-out over the fact that Baker's positioning of the Secretariat Building interfered with the view of the Viceroy's House; Lutyen's had misjudged the effect of Baker's gradient and, despite his appeals to the committee, was unable to have it changed. When they returned to England in 1915, the feud continued and became very public. Writing of the New Delhi project, The Architectural Review, among others, heaped praise on Lutyens' work and dismissed Baker's in insulting and demeaning terms. Baker not only maintained a dignified silence but, when Lutyens died in 1944, wrote that his talents were equal to those of Christopher Wren. The incident appeared to destroy Baker's confidence; none of his post-Delhi buildings met the standard of his previous work.

=== World War I Cemeteries & Memorials ===
While the friendship between the two men would not recover, Baker and Lutyens worked together again when, in 1918, and along with Reginald Blomfield, they were appointed as the Principal Architects to the Imperial War Graves Commission, the organization responsible for properly laying to rest the thousands of fallen soldiers of the British Commonwealth after World War I. The three men were given the enormous task of designing hundreds of cemeteries, mainly in France and Belgium. There were no budgetary restrictions but the job had to be done quickly. A team of 17 architects was assembled; when needed, Baker chose as his assistants William Harrison Cowlishaw, Arthur Hutton, Noel Rew and his former student Gordon Leith. Baker completed 112 cemeteries, extensions to existing cemeteries, and memorial structures in France, one cemetery in Belgium and 24 memorials in England. The best-known of these are the Loos Memorial to the Missing, the Neuve-Chapelle Indian Memorial, the Delville Wood South African National Memorial and the Tyne Cot Commonwealth War Graves Cemetery and Memorial to the Missing which, with 12,000 graves, remains the largest Commonwealth cemetery in the world.

=== Kenya ===
In 1920, Kenya became a Colony of the British Empire, with Nairobi as its capital. At the end of World War I, it was merely the supply depot for the Uganda Railway and was nothing more than some wood and iron buildings—banks, churches, a theatre, a school, a hospital and some administrative buildings. To create a master plan for the new city, the Nairobi Municipal Council commissioned the South African engineer Frank Walton Jameson but, in 1925, the new Governor of Kenya, Edward Grigg, brought in Herbert Baker and would later refer to the city's plan as the "Baker-Jameson proposals". The planning of Nairobi was controversial as it clearly laid out racial segregation. Indian immigration and land ownership were restricted and there were mounting tensions between Africans, Indians and Europeans. Baker's solution for what he called the "Green City in the Sun" was the design of imposing, dominant Imperial structures placed on hilltops. He spent five years in Kenya. Assisted by the South African architect Jan Hoogterp, Baker undoubtedly designed numerous buildings, and it is known that he built many schools, however records indicate only his best-known structures such as the Prince of Wales School, Government House, the Supreme Court Building and Nairobi City Hall.

=== The Bank of England ===
Through the 1920s and into the 1930s, Baker built numerous significant structures in England, mostly in London. His final building would be the Bank of England building, a project that would permanently cast a pall on his reputation.

In 1833, Sir John Soane completed the bank’s head office, a three-acre structure, built bit-by-bit, of interior halls, courtyards, domes and shadowy courts behind windowless, fortress-like walls. By 1920, this design was no longer fit for purpose; the bank’s staff had grown from 1,200 to 4,000. It needed offices, more light, a more organized, businesslike structure, and more public access. Baker was chosen (over Luytens) to build the new structure; he was told it needed to convey “strength, permanence and reliability”. The only way to achieve this was by demolishing the entire building.

Baker was an admirer of Soane. He also knew that Soane’s building, nicknamed the 'Old Lady of Threadneedle Street', was much loved. He went to great lengths to respect his predecessor, recreating Soane’s original classic symbolism and creative flourishes, even copying and repositioning entire spaces. He undertook the largest creative commission of that time, hiring Charles Wheeler to create numerous statues and the Russian artist Boris Anrep to create murals and mosaics. He kept the outer walls and re-used Soane’s columns and friezes. Soane’s foundation had been built over Roman ruins; Baker excavated these and used several found pieces. He used the new technology of steel framing for stability, created new tube staircases for the public, opened domes and expanded the entrance. He topped the structure with a golden statue of Shakespeare’s Ariel, representing the spirit of the bank.

Despite Baker’s efforts, the Bank of England building, completed in 1938, was savaged by critics, who called it “pompous”. Summing up the opinion of many members of the public, and Baker’s professional peers, the architectural historian Nikolaus Pevsner called the demolition of Soane’s building “the greatest architectural crime, in the City of London, of the 20th century”. With another world war approaching and few major projects expected, and having reached age 76, Baker retired.

== Personal life and death ==
In 1904, Baker married his cousin, Florence Edmeades (1878-1965). They had four children. In 1914, Florence's father-in-law, Major-General Henry Edmeades, was killed in battle; in 1916, Baker commissioned the artist Christopher Whall to create a five-light window dedicated to Edmeades in St Mildred's Church, Nurstead, Kent.

Baker's love of symbolism in his designs has been attributed to the fact that he was a Freemason; he was also deeply religious.

Baker had inherited his father's estate and retired to Owletts, where he wrote his autobiography, Architecture & Personalities, which was published in 1944. He bequeathed Owletts to the National Trust, and lived there until his death. Despite opposition from the Royal Academy of Arts, the Dean of Westminster considered Baker the "Architect of the Commonwealth" and offered burial in Westminster Abbey. Charles Wheeler gathered signatures of support and, on February 13, 1946, Baker was buried in the abbey's nave, in an ashes casket made from a cherry tree in his garden.

== Honours ==
Baker received a knighthood (in the 1926 King's Birthday Honours List), was elected to the Royal Academy, received the Royal Institute of British Architects' Royal Gold Medal in 1927, and received an honorary doctorate from the University of the Witwatersrand and an honorary Doctor of Civil Law degree from Oxford University.

In 2026, members of Baker's family established the Herbert Baker Heritage Trust, to promote and protect "excellence in traditional building techniques and heritage craft skills" and support "future generations of artists, makers, and heritage professionals."

== Works ==
=== South Africa ===
- Wynberg Boys' High School, Cape Town, 1892
- Groote Schuur, Cape Town, 1893
- House James Rose-Innes: 'Kolara', Cape Town, 1893
- Church of the Good Shepherd, Robben Island, 1895
- Church of St Barnabas, Cape Town, 1896
- Kelvin Grove Club, Cape Town, 1896
- Royal Observatory, Cape Town, 1897
- St Philip's Church, Cape Town, 1898 (with Masey)
- St. John's College, Johannesburg, 1898
- House Herbert Baker: 'Sandhills', Muizenberg, 1899
- Wilson and Miller Building, Cape Town, 1899
- House Harry Struben: 'Tafelberg Hall', Graaff-Reinet, 1900
- Holy Trinity Anglican Church Rectory, Kalk Bay, 1900
- Vredenburgh Cottages inc. Rhodes Cottage, Stellenbosch, 1900
- House John Charles Molteno: 'Sandown', Cape Town, 1900
- St Michael and All Angels Church & School, Cape Town, 1900
- House Rudyard Kipling: 'The Woolsack', Cape Town, 1900
- House Currey: 'Welgelegen', Cape Town, 1900 (with Masey)
- Cottage 1685, Champagne Homestead, Boschendal, 1901
- St Matthew's Anglican Church, Riversdale, Extensions, 1901
- House Searle: 'Highlands', Cape Town, 1901
- Groot Constantia, Constantia, Cape Town, Restoration 1902
- House Herbert Baker: 'Stone House', Johannesburg, 1902
- Isaacs and Company Building, Cape Town, 1902
- House H.E.S. Fremantle, Cape Town, 1902
- De Beers Building, Cape Town, 1902
- House Wilfred John Wybergh: 'Inanda', Johannesburg, 1902
- Guardian Assurance Company Building, Cape Town, 1902 (with Masey)
- House Karri-Davies: 'The Outspan', Johannesburg, 1902
- Languedoc Village, Boschendal, 1902
- House Balfour: 'Pilrig', Johannesburg, 1903
- De Beers Dynamite Co./Cape Explosives Works, Somerset West, 1903
- The Stables of Pallinghurst, Johannesburg, 1903
- House Barry: 'Hurstcliff', Johannesburg, 1903 (with Masey)
- House FitzPatrick: 'Buckland Downs', Verkykerskop, 1903
- St Thomas' Church, Cape Town, Mission Chapel 1903
- St Paul's Church, Cape Town, Rectory, 1903
- Roedean School, Johannesburg, 1903
- House Kuhlmann, Johannesburg, 1903
- Rondebosch Girls' High School, Cape Town, 1903
- Van der Byl & Co Building, Cape Town, 1904
- House Dale Lace: 'Northwards', Johannesburg, 1904 (with Masey & Sloper)
- ERPM Recreation Hall, Boksburg, 1904
- St. George's Grammar School, Cape Town, 1904, Expansion
- Rust en Vrede, Cape Town, 1904
- Duke of Westminster Estate: 'The Big House', Tweespruit, 1904
- St Andrew's Church, Cape Town, 1904
- Honoured Dead Memorial, Kimberley, 1904
- St Saviour's Church, Cape Town, 1904 (with Masey)
- Grey College, Bloemfontein, Additions, 1904 (with Masey)
- House Drummond Chaplin: 'Marienhof', Johannesburg, 1904
- Bishops Diocesan College, Cape Town, 1905 (with Masey)
- Standard Bank, Malmesbury, 1905
- Bedford Farm (St Andrew's School), Johannesburg, c 1905
- Houses of Parliament, Cape Town, Extensions, 1906
- Cathedral of St Andrew and St Michael, Bloemfontein, 1906
- Government House, Pretoria, 1906
- South African College, Cape Town, 1907 (with Masey)
- St Augustine's School, Cape Town, 1907
- Lightfoot Memorial Fountain, Capetown, 1907
- Pretoria Railway Station, 1908
- St. Anne's Diocesan College Chapel, Hilton, 1908
- House Pickstone, Lekkerwijn, Franschhoek, 1908
- Michaelhouse School Chapel, Balgowan, 1908
- St. Andrew's College, Grahamstown, House & Chapel, 1909
- St Mary's Church, Richmond, 1909
- St Dunstan's Anglican Church, Benoni, 1909
- St Alban's Cathedral, Pretoria, 1909 (w Masey)
- House Dalrymple: 'Glenshiel', Johannesburg, 1910 (with Fleming)
- House Lionel Phillips: 'Villa Arcadia', Johannesburg, 1910
- St Boniface Church, Germiston, 1910
- House Mrs G B Given-Wilson, Johannesburg, 1910
- Rhodes University, Grahamstown, 1910
- St. George's Cathedral, Cape Town, 1911
- St. Martin's School (Rosettenville), 1911
- St Michael and All Angels Anglican Church, Boksburg, 1911
- House Rockcorry, Kalk Bay, 1912
- Rhodes Memorial, Cape Town, 1912
- South African Institute for Medical Research, Johannesburg, 1912
- Potchefstroom College of Agriculture, Selborne Hall, Potchefstroom, 1913
- Bishop's Lea, George, 1913
- Union Buildings, Pretoria, 1913
- St John the Baptist Church, Vaalwater, 1913 (with Fleming)
- Union Club, Johannesburg, 1914 (with Fleming)
- Templeton High School, Bedford, 1914
- St Margaret's School, Johannesburg, 1914
- House Alpheus Williams: 'Vergenoegd', Muizenberg, 1915
- Holiday Houses: 'Crawford Lea', 'Coel an Mar', 'Swanbourne' & 'Rokeby', Muizenberg, 1915 (with Kendall)
- Bishop Bavin School, St. George's, Johannesburg, 1915
- House Pickstone: 'La Gratitude', Hermanus, 1917
- St John's The Divine Anglican Church, Durban, 1922
- House Drummond Chaplin: 'Noordhoek Manor', Cape Town, 1925
- Old Mill House, De la Bat School for the Deaf, Worcester, 1929
- Groote Schuur Zoo Lions' Den, Capetown, 1931
- Barclays Bank, Cape Town, 1936

=== Rhodesia ===
- Salisbury Stock Exchange, Salisbury, 1896
- House Julius Weil, Salisbury, c 1910
- Brontë Hotel, Salisbury, 1911
- Cathedral of Saint Mary and All Saints, Salisbury, 1912
- Rhodesia Museum, Bulawayo, 1922

=== France ===
- Adanac Military Cemetery, Courcelette
- AIF Burial Ground, Flers
- Aire Communal Cemetery, Aire-sur-la-Lys
- Arnèke British Cemetery, Arnèke
- ANZAC Cemetery, Sailly-sur-la-Lys
- Australian Memorial Park, Fromelles
- Aval Wood Military Cemetery, Vieux-Berquin
- Bailleul Communal Cemetery, Bailleul
- Beaurevoir British Cemetery, Beaurevoir
- Bernafay Wood British Cemetery, Montauban
- Blighty Valley Cemetery, Authuille
- Borre British Cemetery, Borre
- Bouchoir New British Cemetery, Bouchoir
- Brewery Orchard Cemetery, Bois-Grenier
- Brie British Cemetery, Brie
- Bulls Road Cemetery, Flers
- Caix British Cemetery, Caix
- Calais Southern Cemetery, Pas De Calais
- Caterpillar Valley Cemetery & New Zealand Memorial, Longueval
- Cite Bonjean Military Cemetery & New Zealand Memorial, Armentières
- Combles Communal Cemetery Extension, Combles
- Contalmaison Chateau Cemetery, Contalmaison
- Courcelette British Cemetery, Courcelette
- Courcelette Canadian Memorial, Courcelette
- Croix-du-Bac British Cemetery, Steenwerck
- Dantzig Alley British Cemetery, Mametz
- Delville Wood Cemetery, Longueval
- Delville Wood South African National Memorial, Longueval
- Doingt Communal Cemetery Extension, Picardy
- Ebblinghem Military Cemetery, Ebblinghem
- Épehy Wood Farm Cemetery, Épehy
- Erquinghem-Lys Churchyard Extension, Erquinghem-Lys
- Estaires Communal Cemetery & Extension, Estaires
- Fifteen Ravine British Cemetery, Villers-Plouich
- Fins New British Cemetery, Sorel-le-Grand
- Flatiron Copse Cemetery, Mametz
- Flesquières Hill British Cemetery, Flesquières
- Fouquescourt British Cemetery, Fouquescourt
- Godewaersvelde British Cemetery, Godewaersvelde
- Gommecourt Wood New Cemetery, Foncquevillers
- Gordon Dump Cemetery, Ovillers-la-Boisselle
- Gouzeaucourt New British Cemetery, Gouzeaucourt
- Grandcourt Road Cemetery, Grandcourt
- Guards' Cemetery, Lesboeufs
- Guards' Grave, Villers-Cotterêts
- Guillemont Road Cemetery, Guillemont
- Hargicourt British Cemetery, Hargicourt
- Hazebrouck Communal Cemetery, Hazebrouck
- Hermies Hill British Cemetery, Hermies
- Houplines Communal Cemetery Extension, Houplines
- Jeancourt Communal Cemetery Extension, Jeancourt
- La Chaudiere Military Cemetery, Vimy
- La Kreule Military Cemetery, Hazebrouk
- Laventie Military Cemetery, La Gorgue
- Le Grand Beaumart British Cemetery, Steenwerck
- Le Grand Hasard Military Cemetery, Morbecque
- Le Trou Aid Post Cemetery, Fleurbaix
- Lebucquière Communal Cemetery Extension, Lebucquière
- Les Baraques Military Cemetery, Sangatte
- London Cemetery and Extension, Longueval
- Longuenese Souvenir Cemetery, Saint-Omer
- Lonsdale Cemetery, Authuille
- Loos British Cemetery & Memorial, Loos-en-Gohelle
- Maroc British Cemetery, Grenay
- Meerut Military Cemetery, Saint-Martin-Boulogne
- Merville Communal Cemetery & Extension, Merville
- Méteren Military Cemetery, Méteren
- Mill Road Cemetery, Thiepval
- Neuve-Chapelle Indian Memorial, Neuve-Chapelle
- Norfolk Cemetery, Bécordel-Bécourt
- Outtersteene Communal Cemetery Extension, Bailleul
- Ovillers Military Cemetery, Ovillers-la-Boisselle
- Peronne Road Cemetery, Maricourt
- Philosophe British Cemetery, Mazingarbe
- Pont-D'achelles Military Cemetery, Nieppe
- Pont-Du-Hem Military Cemetery, La Gorgue
- Prospect Hill Cemetery, Gouy
- Quarry Cemetery, Montauban
- Ration Farm Military Cemetery, La Chapelle-d'Armentières
- Regina Trench Cemetery, Grandcourt
- Royal Irish Rifles Graveyard, Laventie
- Roye New British Cemetery, Carrépuis
- Rue-David Military Cemetery, Fleurbaix
- Rue-du-Bacquerot No.1 Military Cemetery, Laventie
- Rue-du-Bois Military Cemetery, Fleurbaix
- Rue-Petillon Military Cemetery, Fleurbaix
- Sailly-Sur-La-Lys Canadian Cemetery, Sailly-sur-la-Lys
- St. Mary's Advance Dressing Station Cemetery, Haisnes
- St. Venant-Robecq Road British Cemetery, Robecq
- Stump Road Cemetery, Grandcourt
- Sunken Road Cemetery, Contalmaison
- Tannay British Cemetery, Thiennes
- Templeux-Le- Guérard British Cemetery, Templeux-le-Guérard
- Terlincthun British Cemetery, Wimille
- Tincourt New British Cemetery, Tincourt-Boucly
- Trois Arbres Cemetery, Steenwerck
- V.C. Corner Australian Cemetery and Memorial, Fromelles
- Vadencourt British Cemetery, Maissemy
- Vermelles British Cemetery, Vermelles
- Vieille-Chapelle New Military Cemetery, La Couture
- Villers-Faucon Communal Cemetery & Extension, Villers-Faucon
- White City Cemetery, Bois-Grenier
- Y Farm Military Cemetery, Bois-Grenier
- Tyne Cot, Passchendaele, Belgium

=== England ===
- Port Lympne Mansion, Lympne, Kent, (with Philip Tilden), 1914
- Blackmoor War Memorial, Blackmoor, Hampshire, 1920
- Chicheley War Memorial, Chicheley, Buckinghamshire, 1920
- Etchingham War Memorial, Etchingham, East Sussex, 1920
- Thorney Hill War Memorial, New Forest, Hampshire, 1920
- Ascot War Memorial, Ascot, Berkshire, 1921
- Cobham War Memorial, Cobham, Kent, 1921
- County of Kent War Memorial Cross, Canterbury, Kent, 1921
- Hampshire & The Isle of Wight War Memorial, Winchester, 1921
- Hatfield War Memorial, Hatfield, Hertfordshire, 1921
- Kemerton War Memorial, Kemerton, Worcestershire, 1921
- King's School War Memorial, Canterbury, Kent, 1921
- Lych-Gate War Memorial, Overbury, Worcestershire, 1921
- Potterne War Memorial, Devizes, Wiltshire, 1921
- Richmond Borough War Memorial, Richmond, North Yorkshire, 1921
- Chilham Castle, Canterbury, Kent: Alterations & Additions, 1922
- Rochester War Memorial, Rochester, Kent, 1922
- Tewin Memorial Hall, Tewin, Hertfordshire, 1922
- Winchester College War Cloister, Winchester, 1922
- Wadhurst War Memorial, Wadhurst, East Sussex, 1923
- Lord's Cricket Ground, London: Grace Gates, Grandstands & Father Time Weather Vane, 1926
- Harrow School War Memorial Building & Shrine, London, 1926
- Rhodes House, Oxford University, 1928
- India House, London, 1930
- Downing College, Cambridge: Residential Blocks, 1931
- Millicent Fawcett Memorial, Westminster Abbey, London, 1932
- Glyn, Mills & Co., London, 1933
- South Africa House, London, 1933
- Westminster School, London: Busby's House, 1933
- Scott Polar Research Institute, Cambridge University: Main Building, 1934
- Church of St. Paul, Woldingham, Surrey, 1934
- Goodenough College, London: Great Hall, Charles Parsons Library, Common Rooms, Guilford Street Entrance, 1935
- Church House, Westminster, London, 1937
- Bank of England, London, 1939

=== Kenya ===
- All Saints Cathedral, Nairobi
- European School, Kitale
- Francis Scott High School, Nakuru
- Government House, Nairobi
- Government Indian School, Nairobi
- Highlands School, Eldoret
- Kenya High School, Nairobi
- Kenya Railways Headquarters, Nairobi
- McMillan Memorial Library, Nairobi
- Nairobi City Hall
- Prince of Wales School, Nairobi
- Supreme Court of Kenya, Nairobi

=== Australia ===
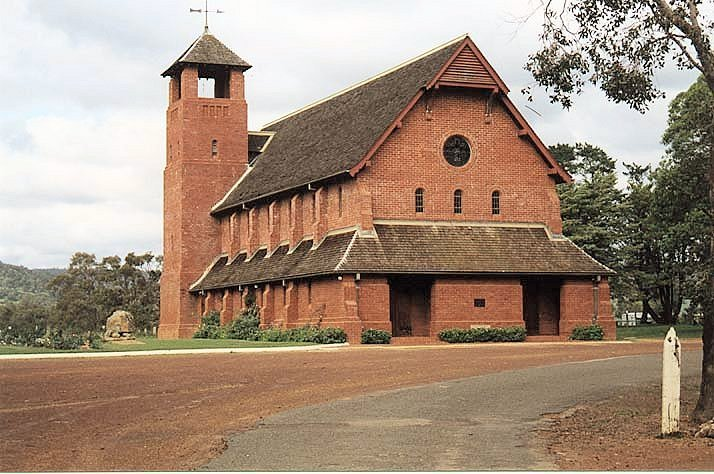
Fairbridge Church, Pinjarra, Western Australia

In 1924, Baker donated the design of Fairbridge Chapel to a children's charity founded by Kingsley Fairbridge.

== Gallery ==
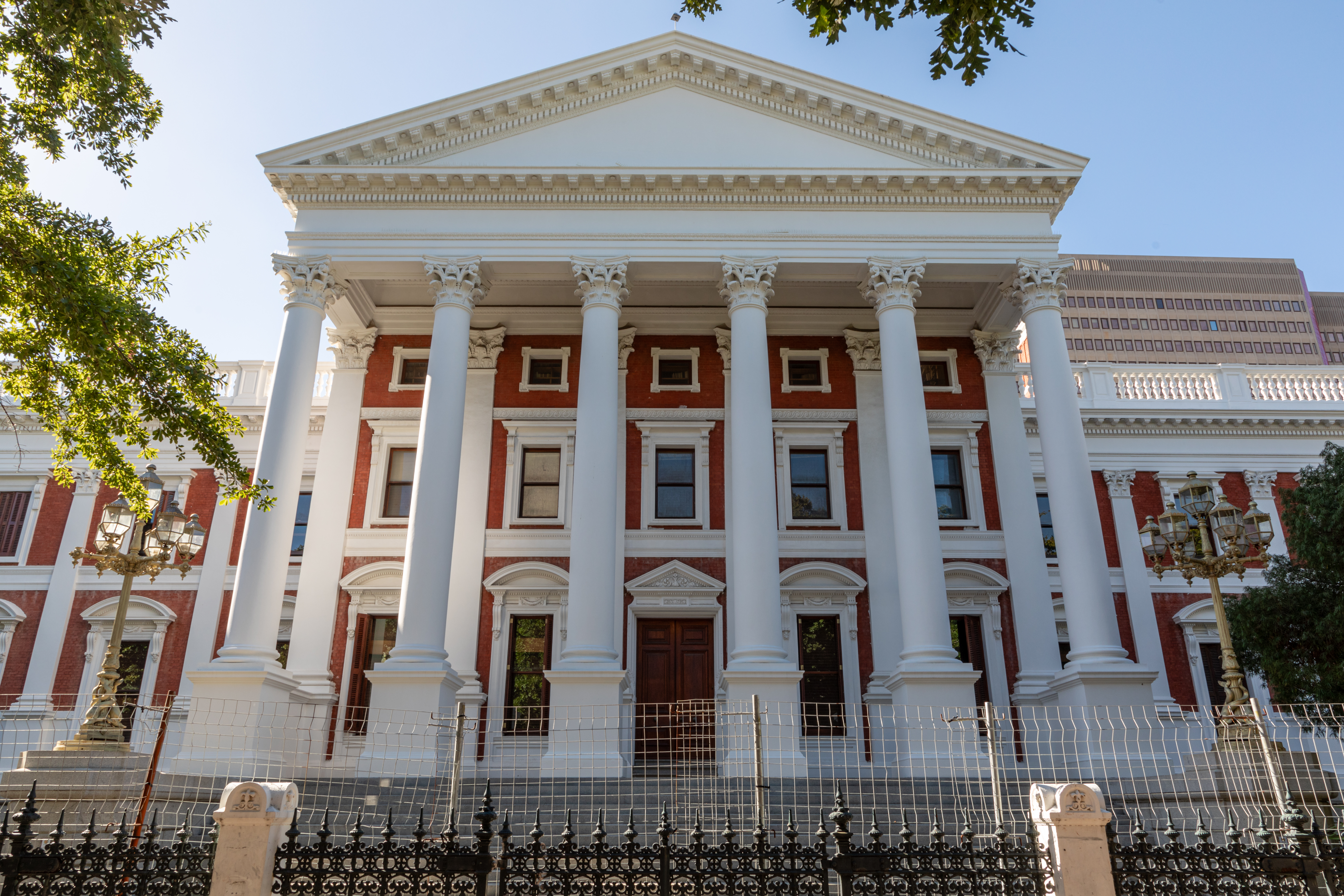
Parliament of South Africa, Cape Town

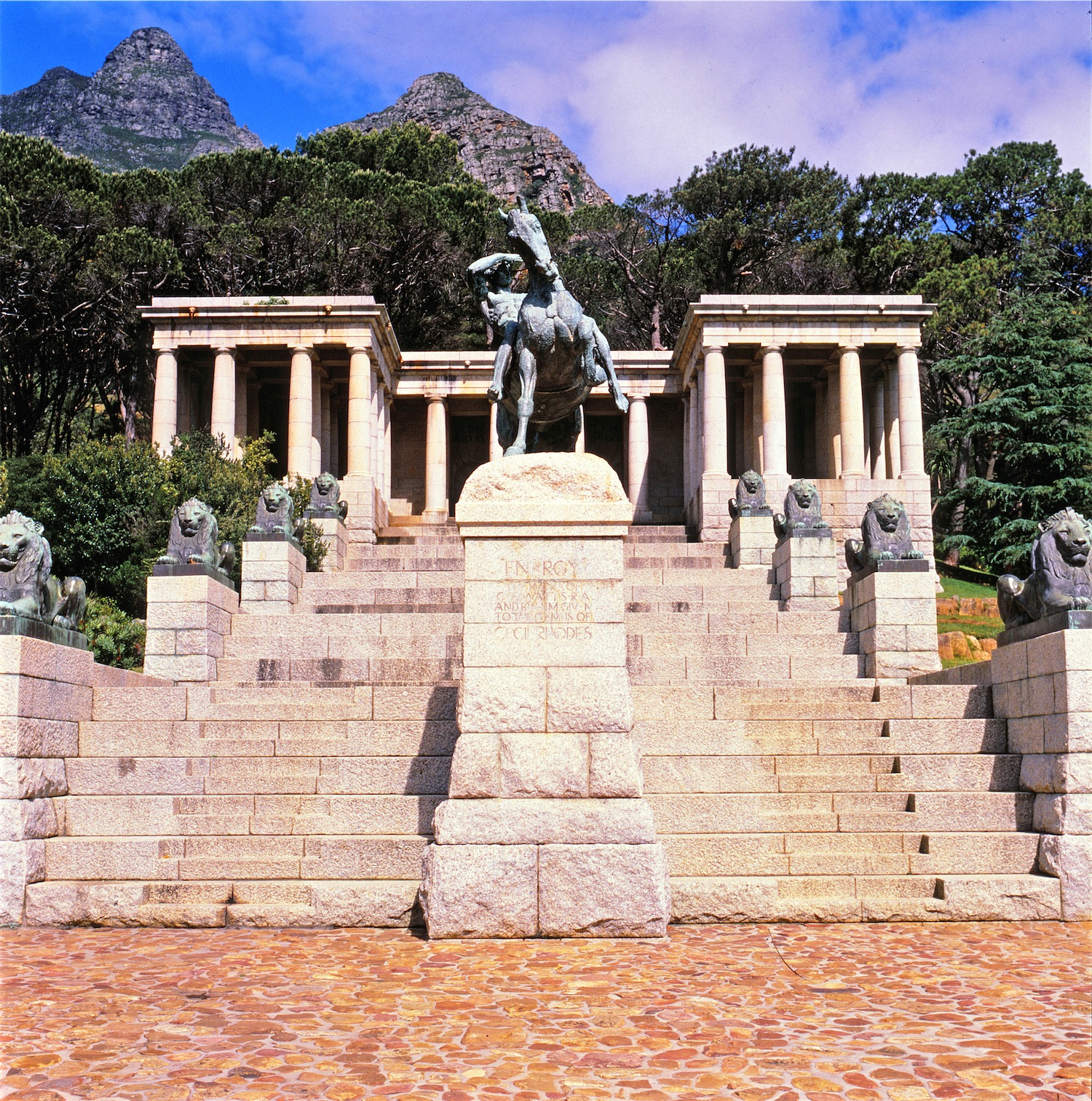
Rhodes Memorial

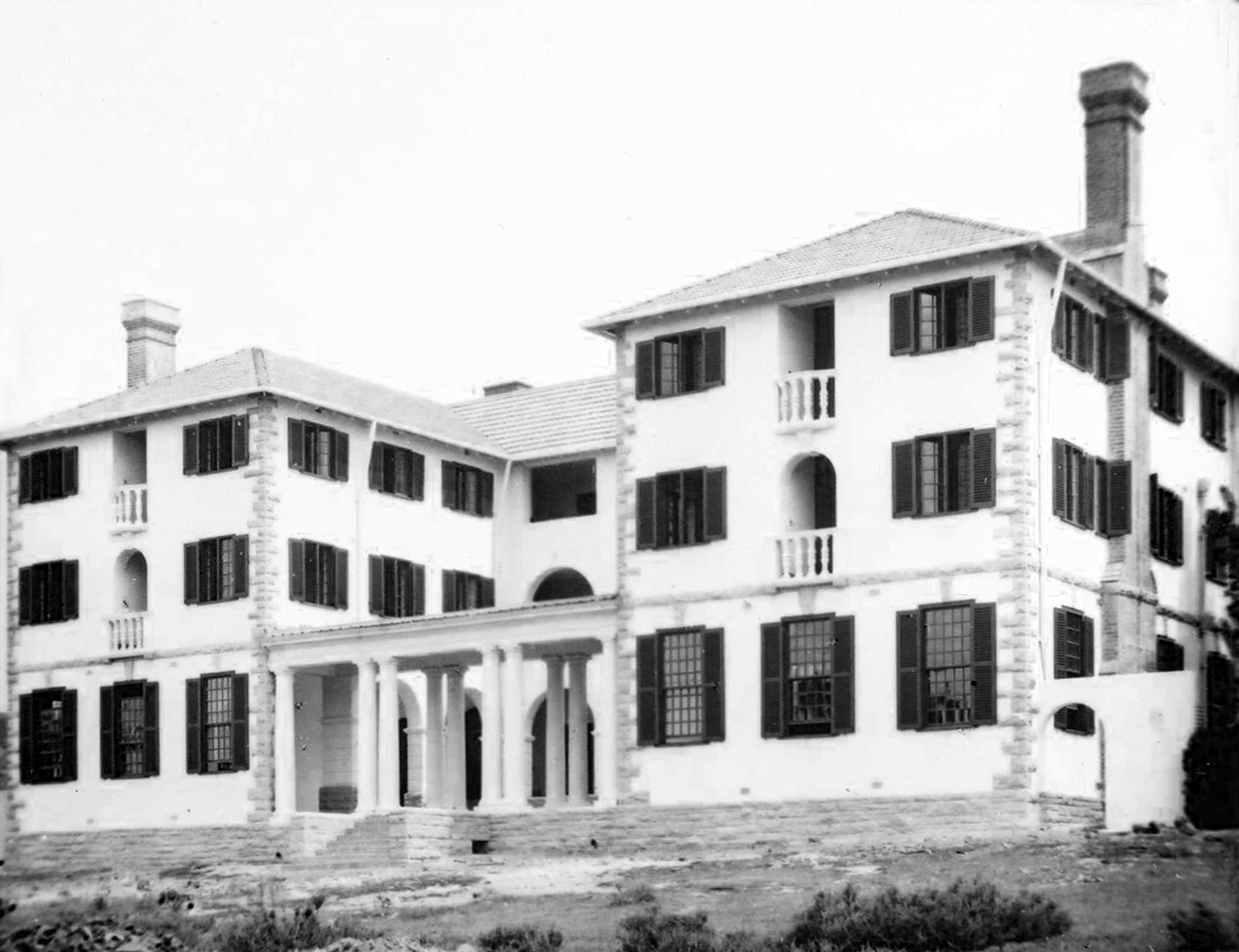
College House, Rhodes University

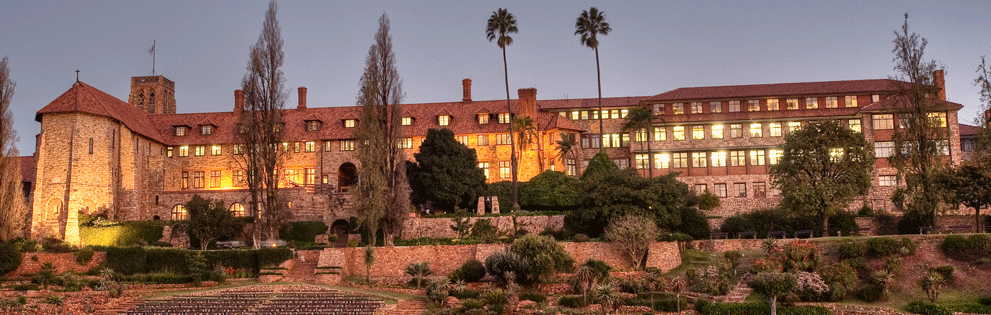
St. John's College, Johannesburg

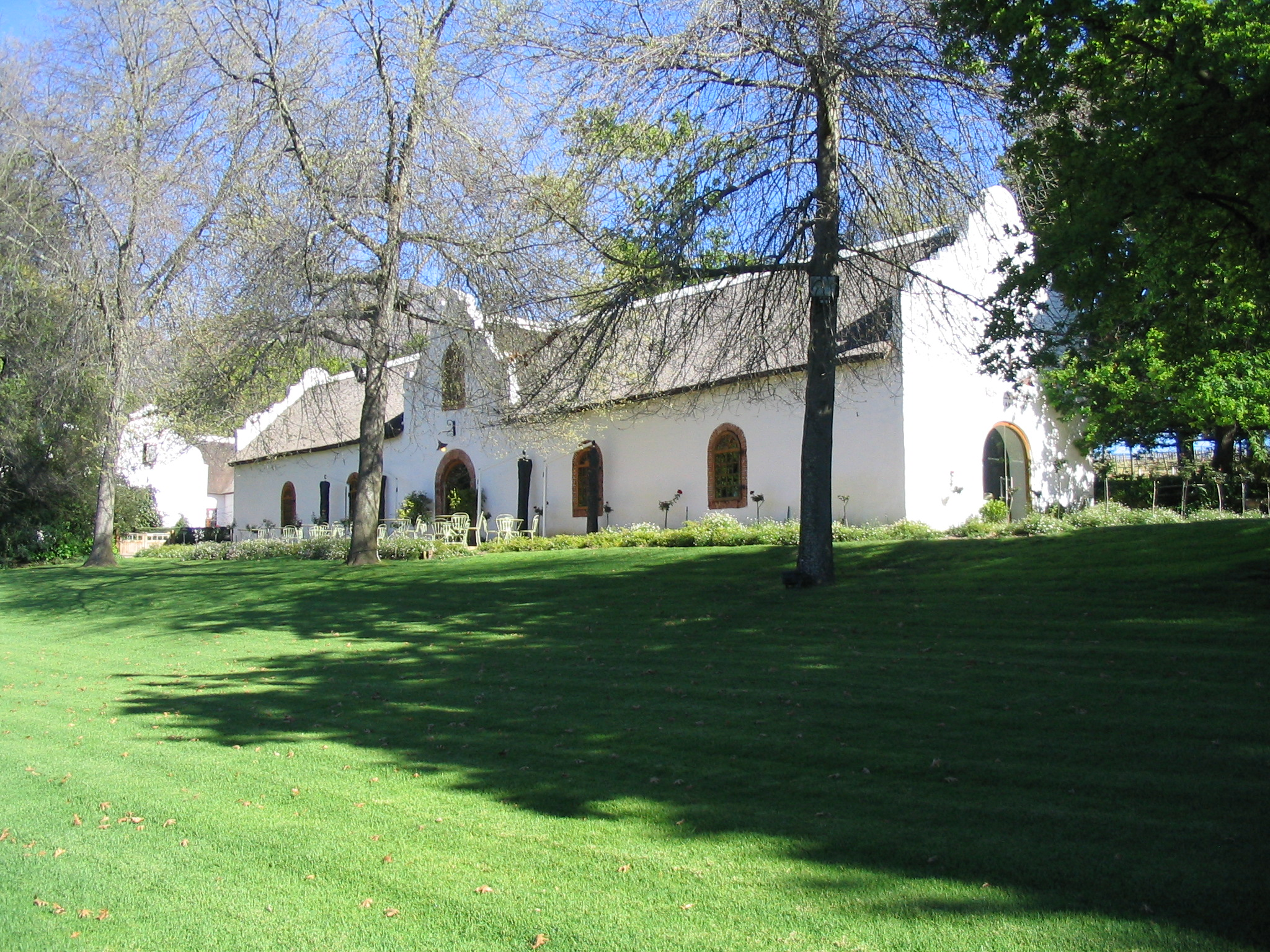
Rust en Vrede

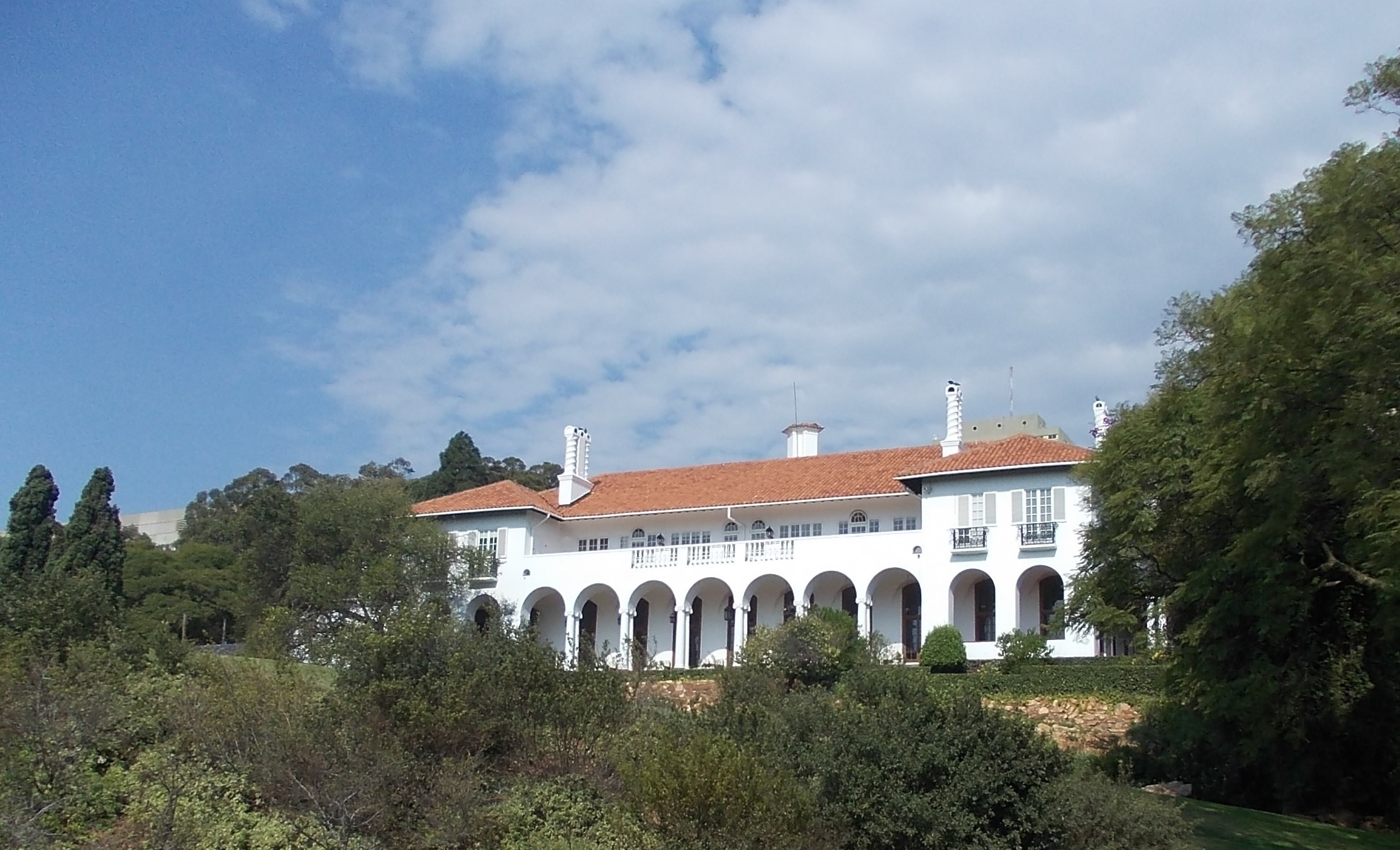
Villa Arcadia, Johannesburg

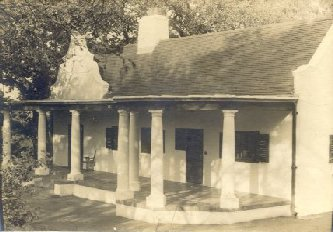
House Rudyard Kipling: 'The Woolsack', Cape Town

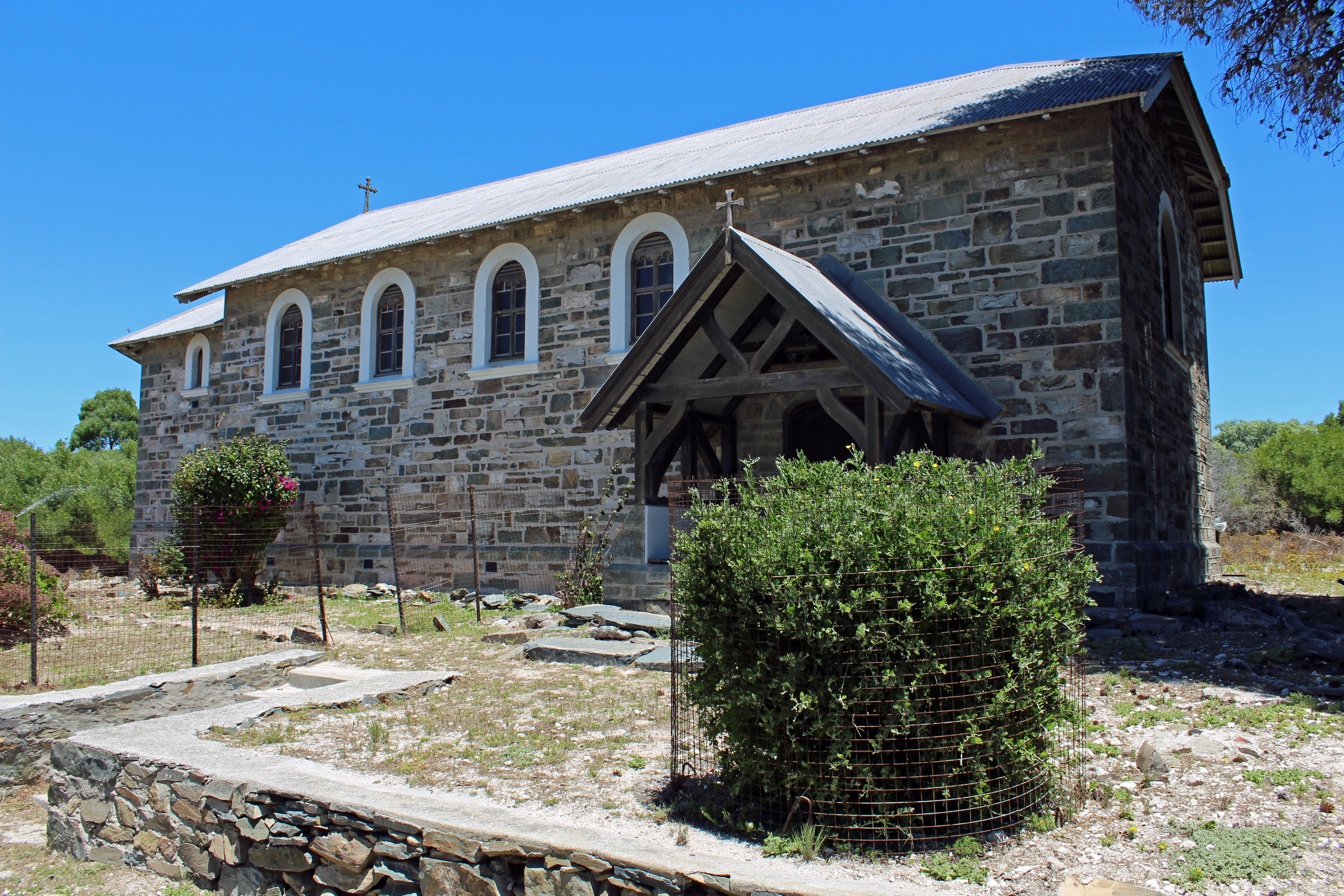
Church of the Good Shepherd, Robben Island

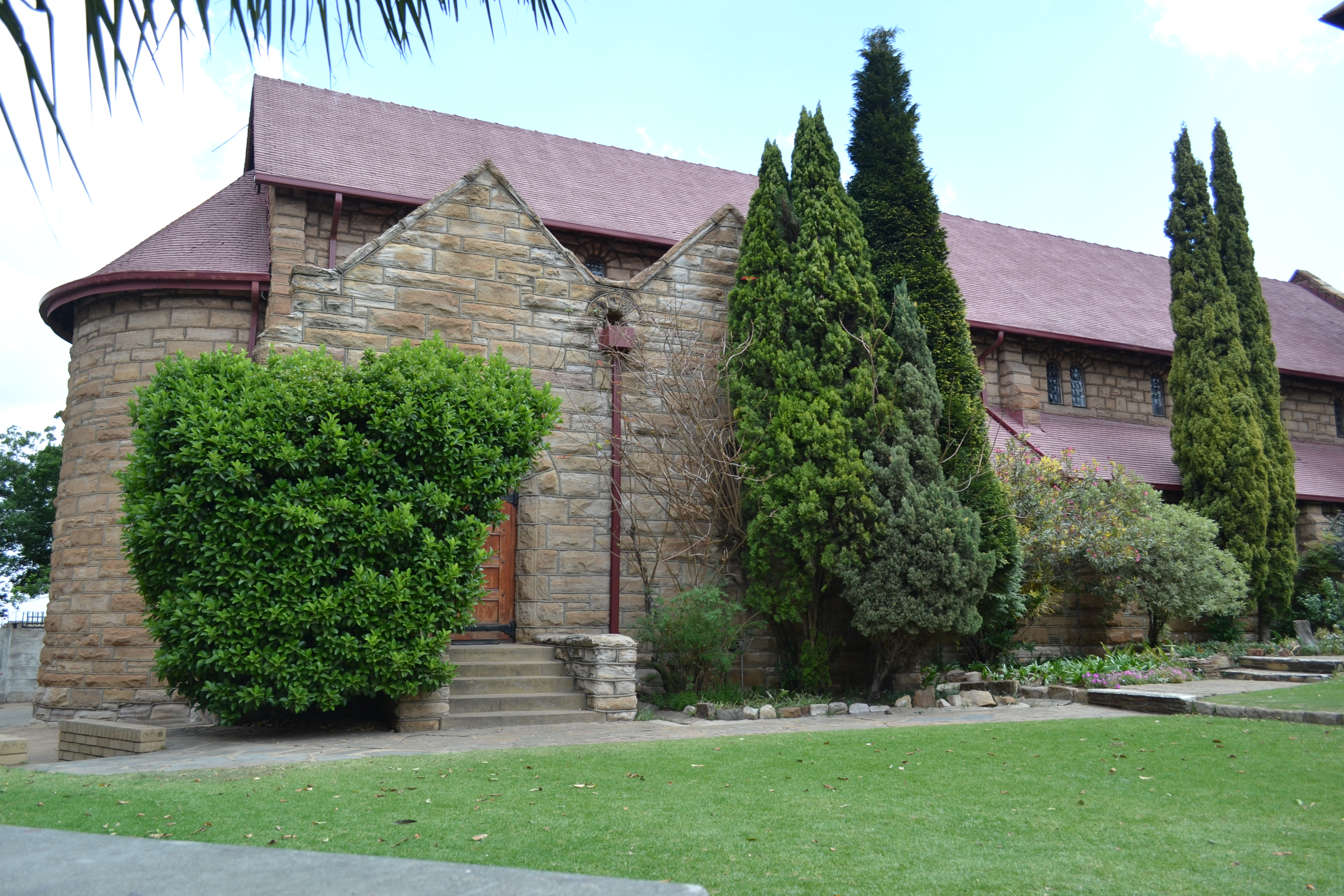
St Michael and All Angels Church, Plein Street, Boksburg

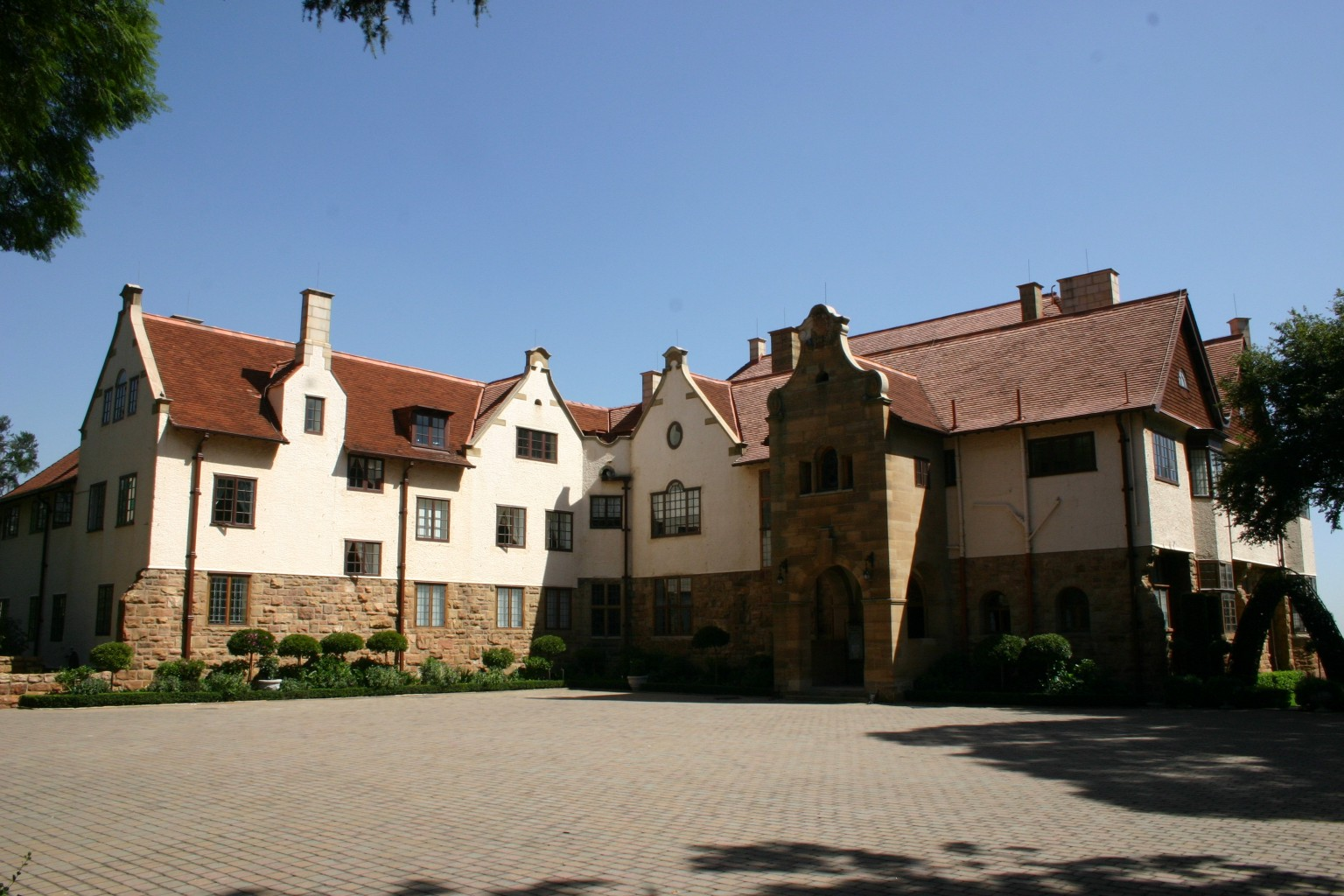
'Northwards', Johannesburg

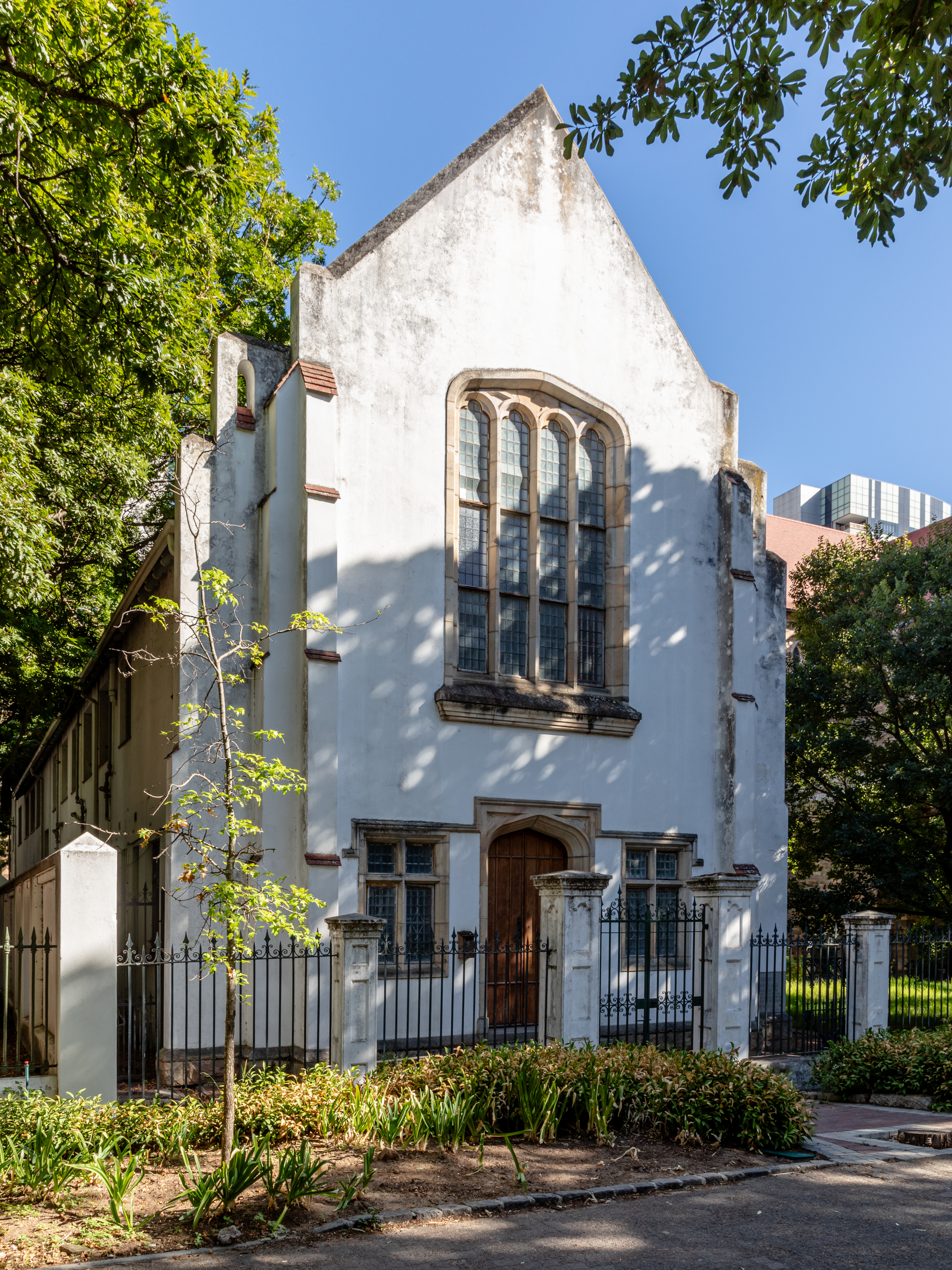
St George's Cathedral School, Cape Town

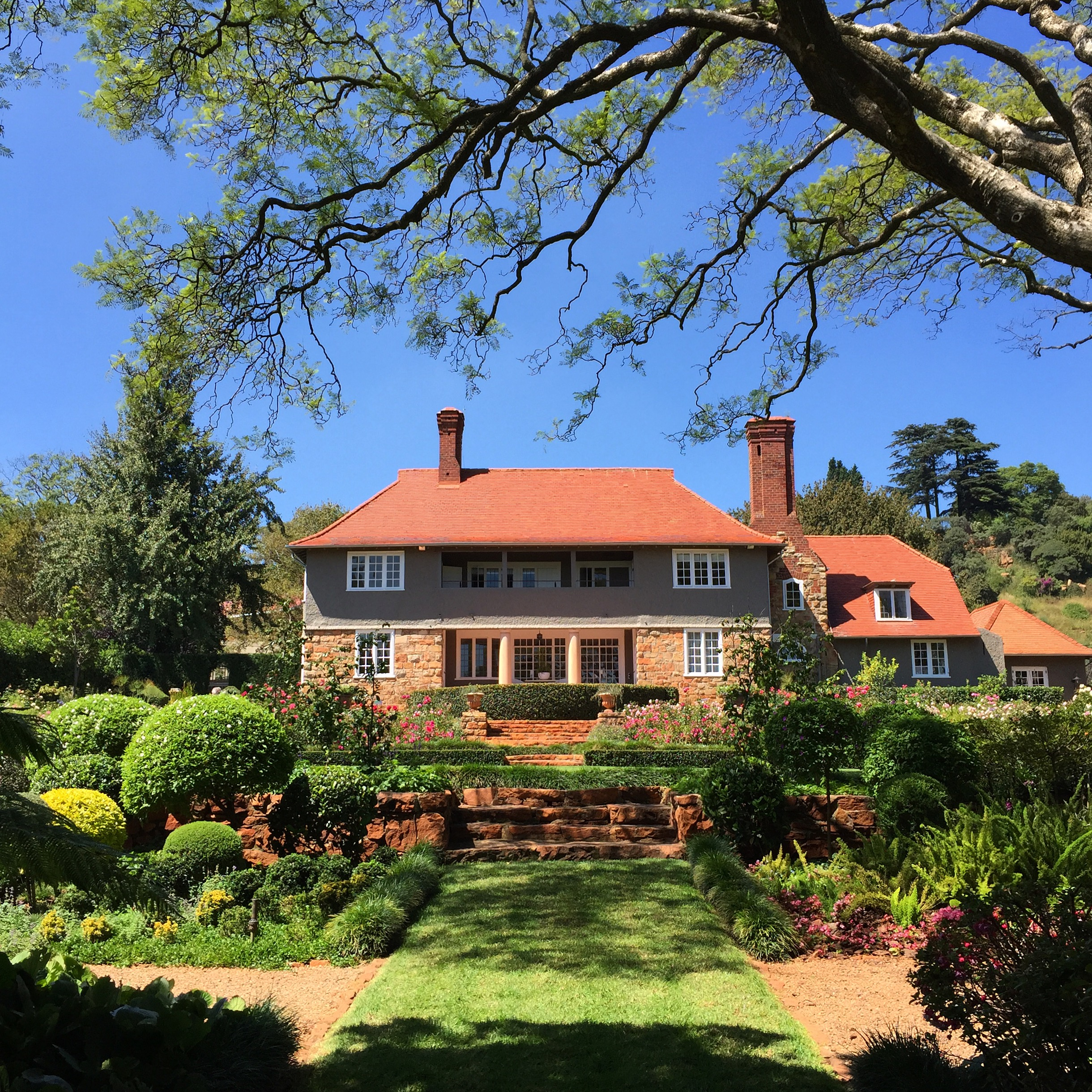
The Moot House, Johannesburg

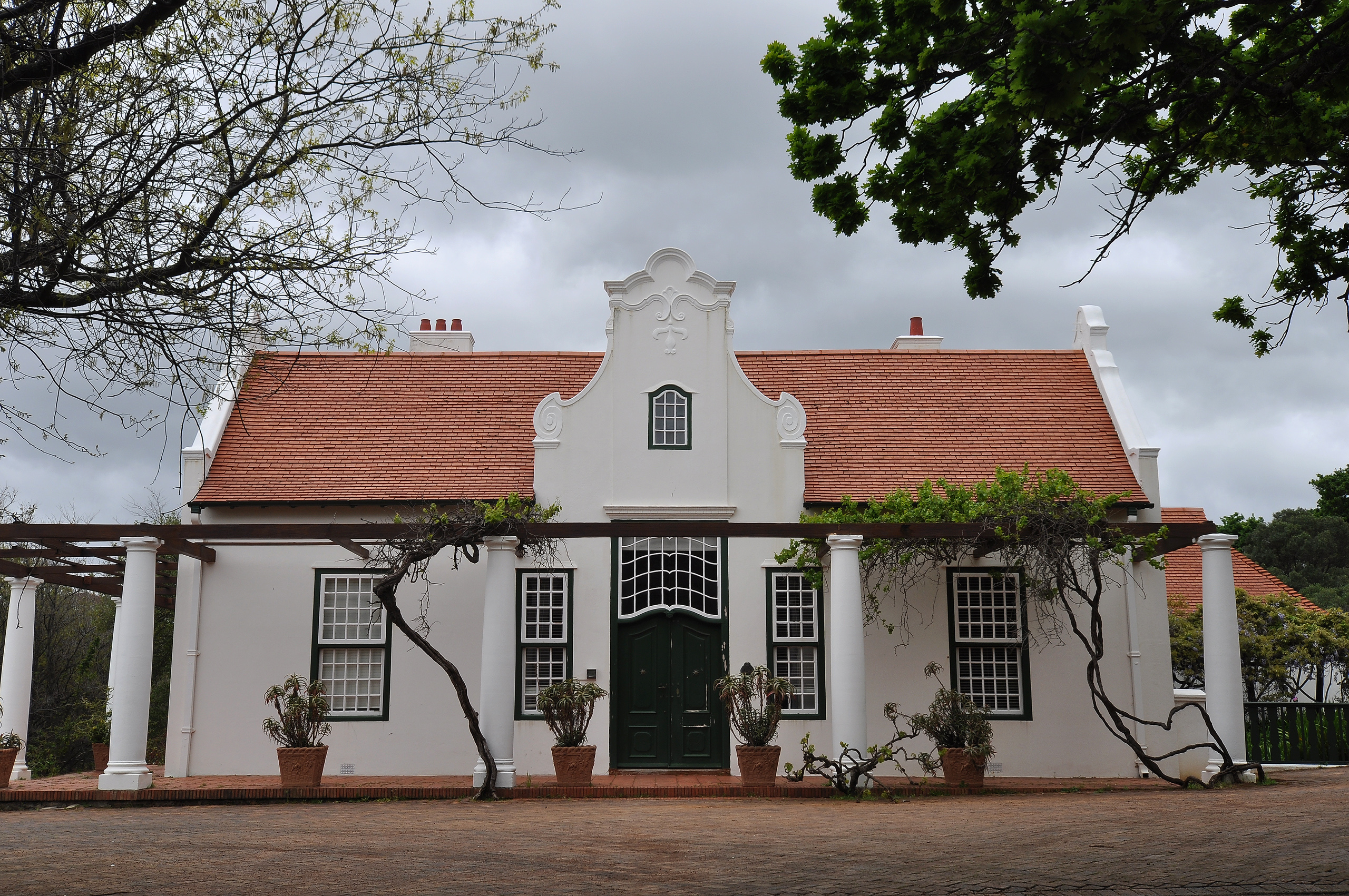
'Welgelegen', Cape Town

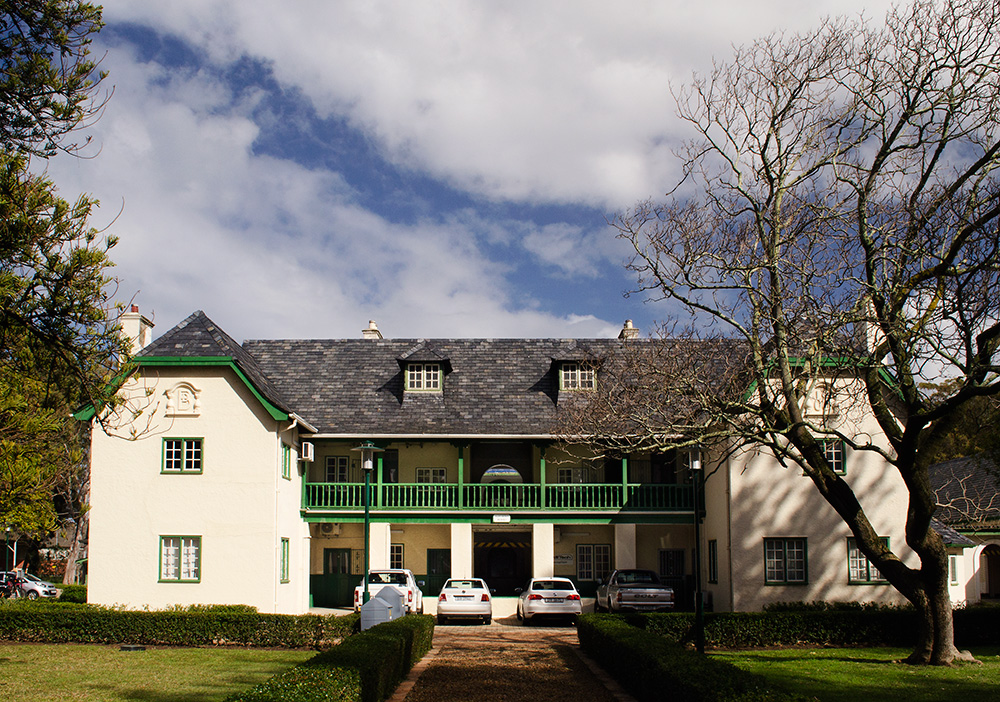
De Beers Explosive Works

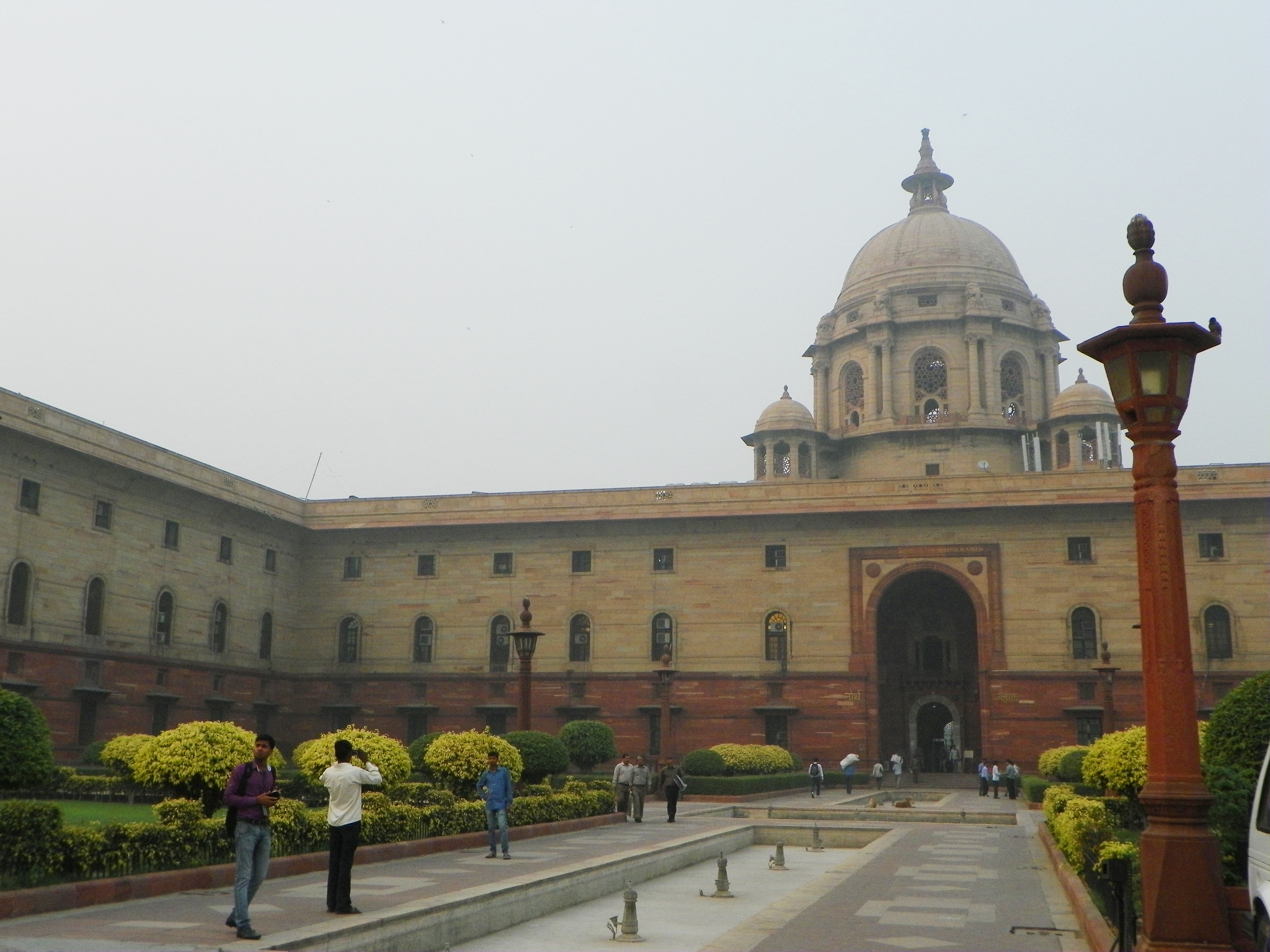
Secretariat North Block, Delhi

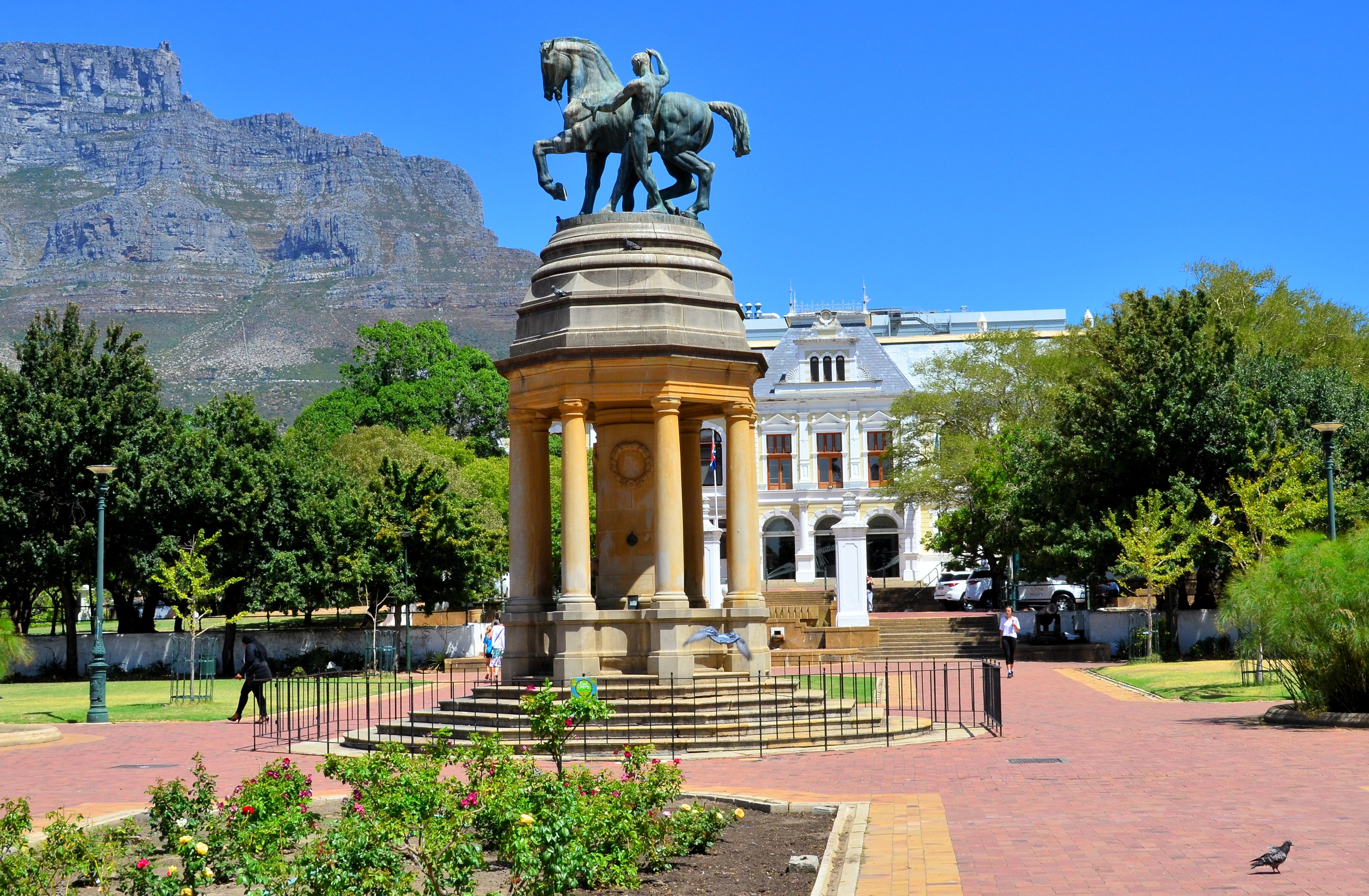
Delville Wood Memorial, Company's Garden

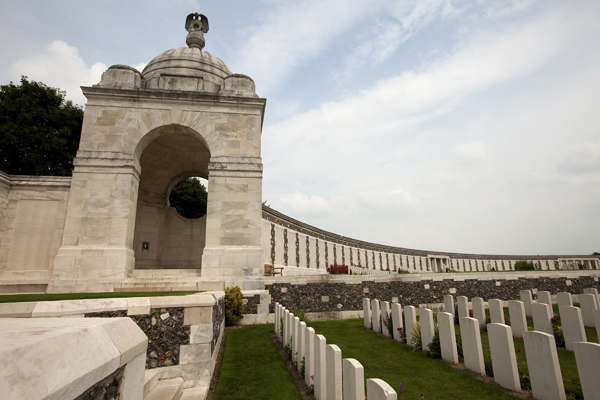
Tyne Cot

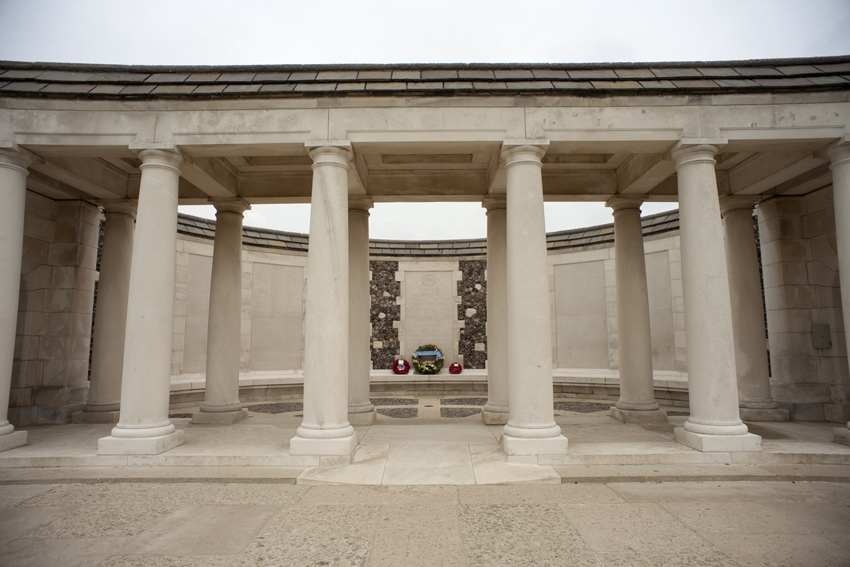
Tyne Cot

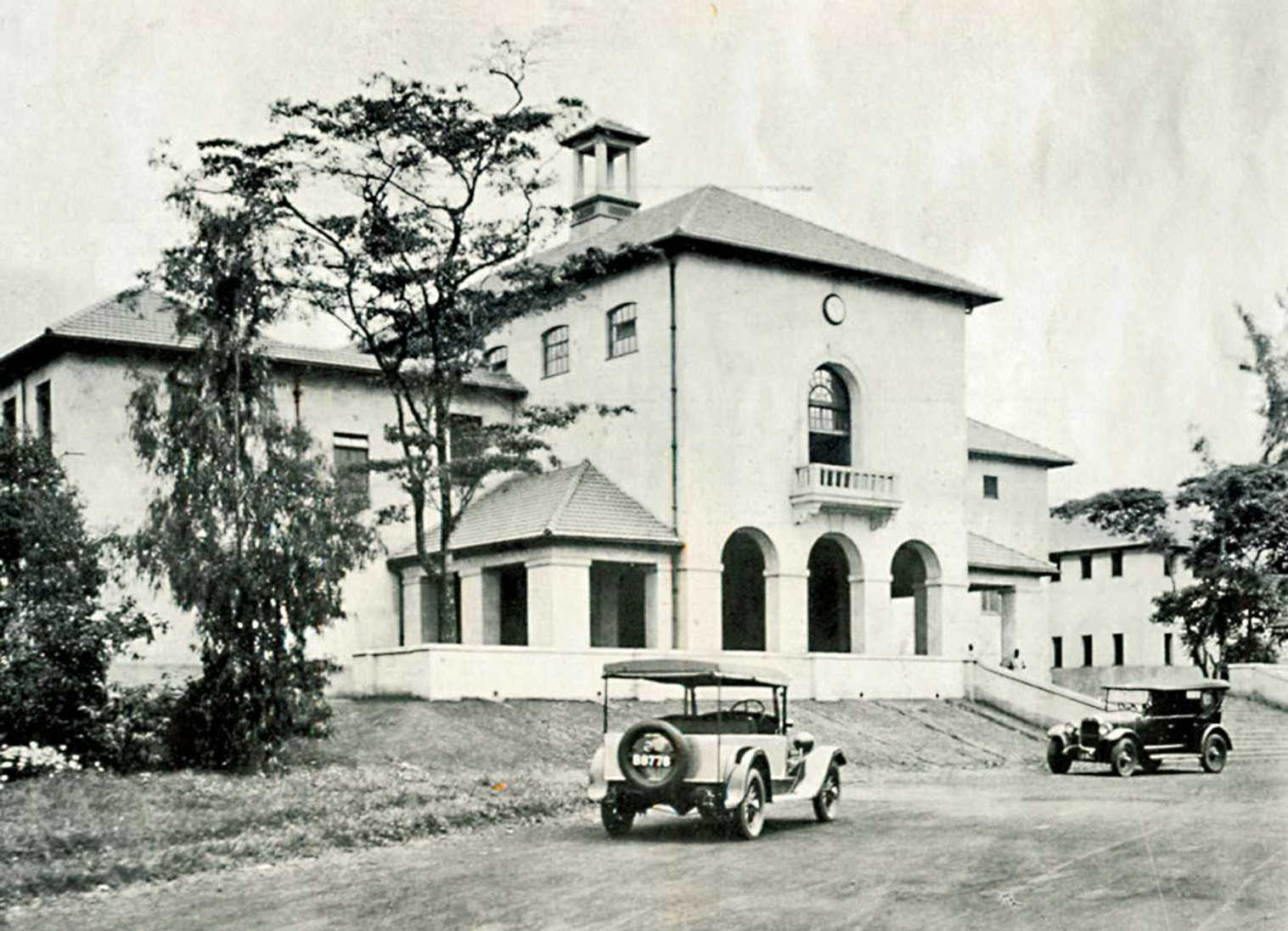
Nairobi School

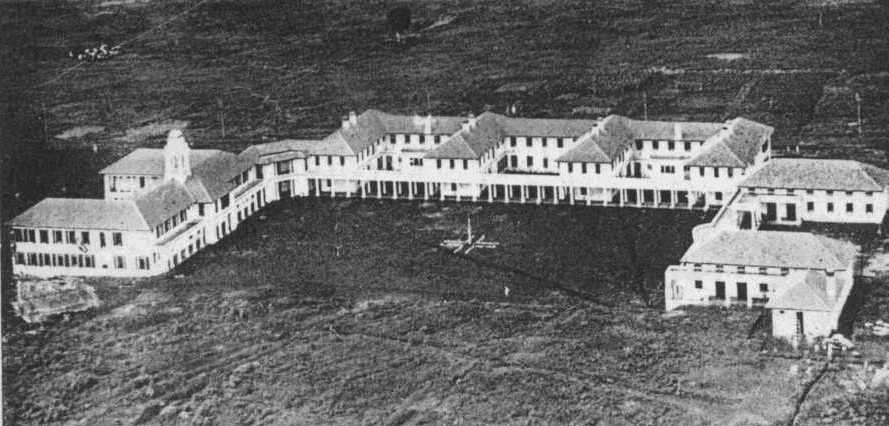
Kabete High School

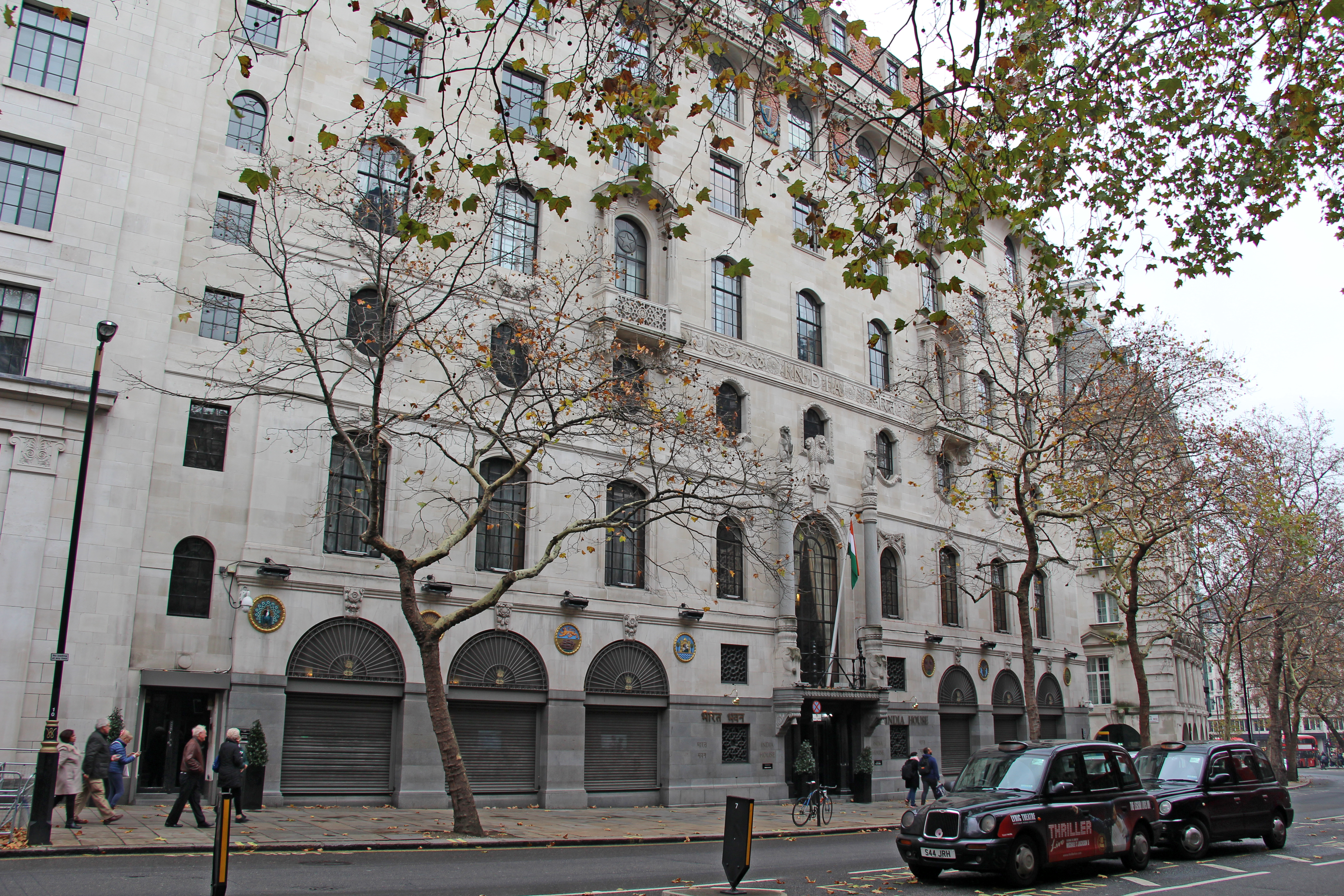
India House, London

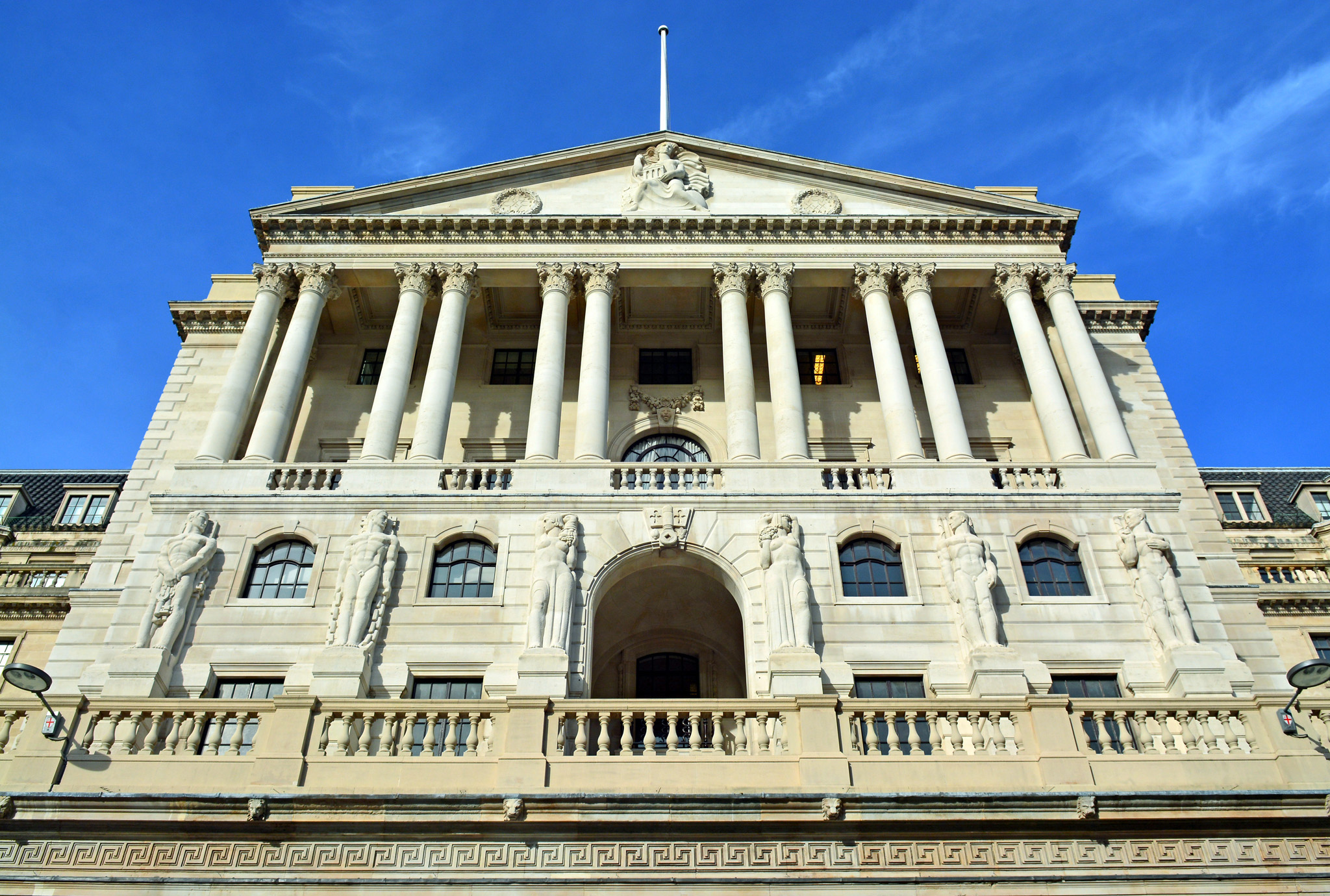
Bank of England Entrance

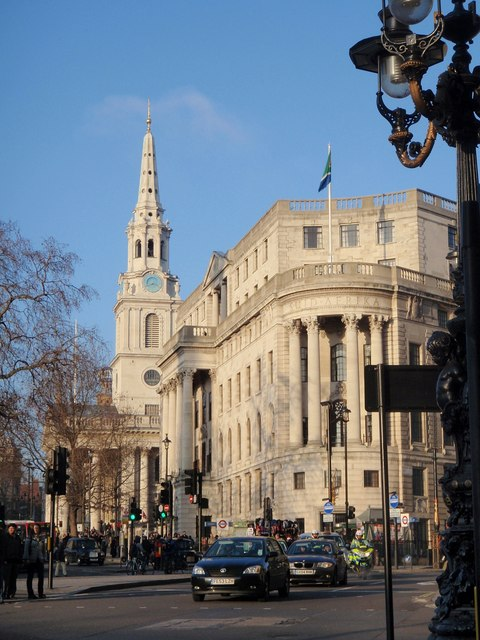
South Africa House, London

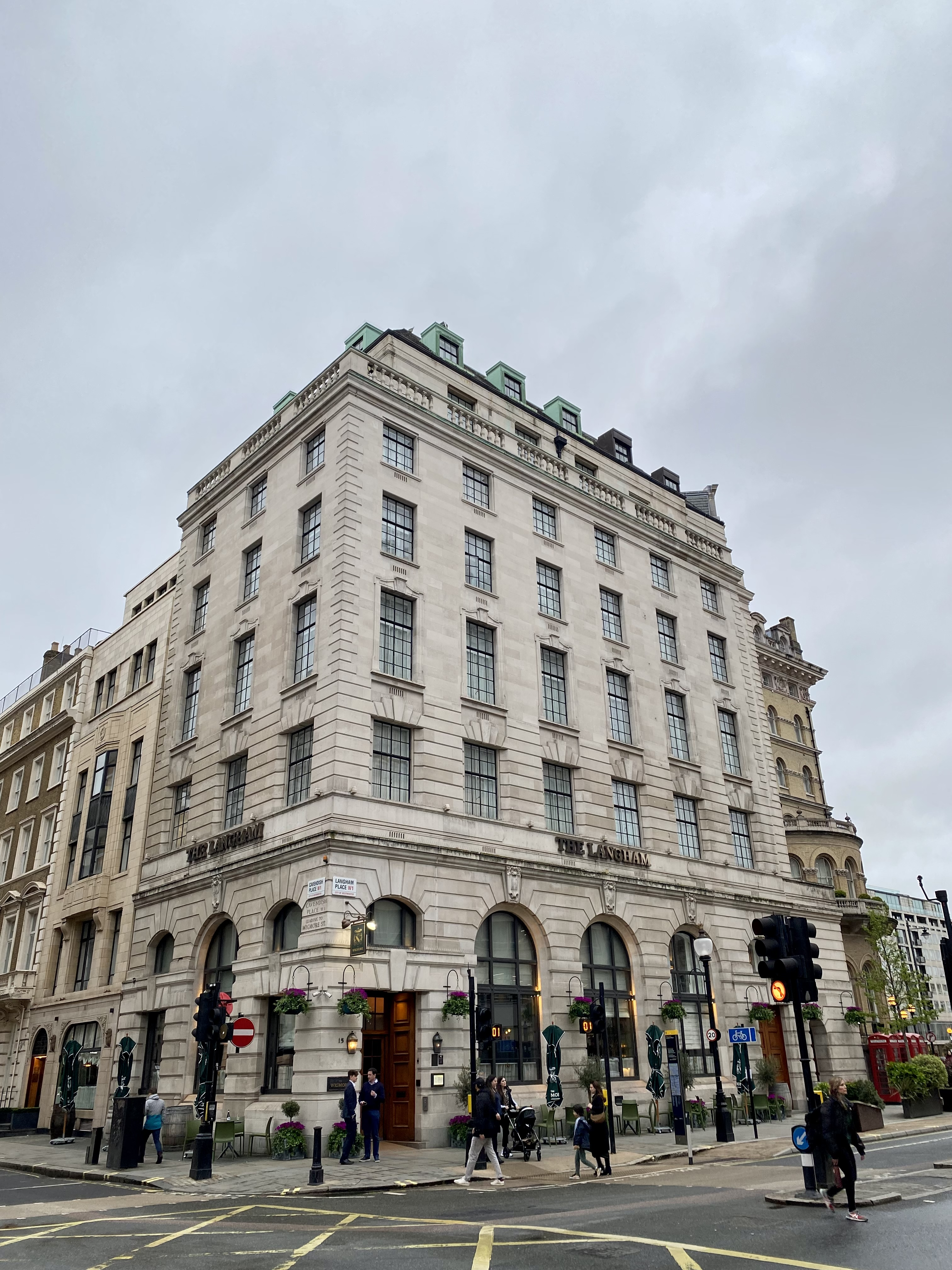
14 and 15 Langham Place, Marylebone, London

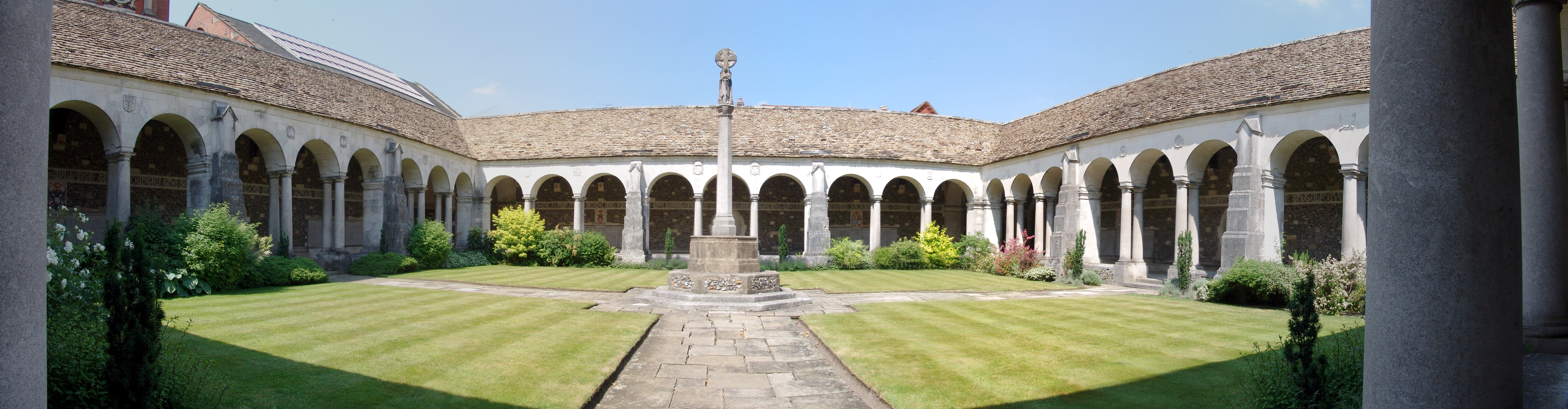
Winchester College War Cloister

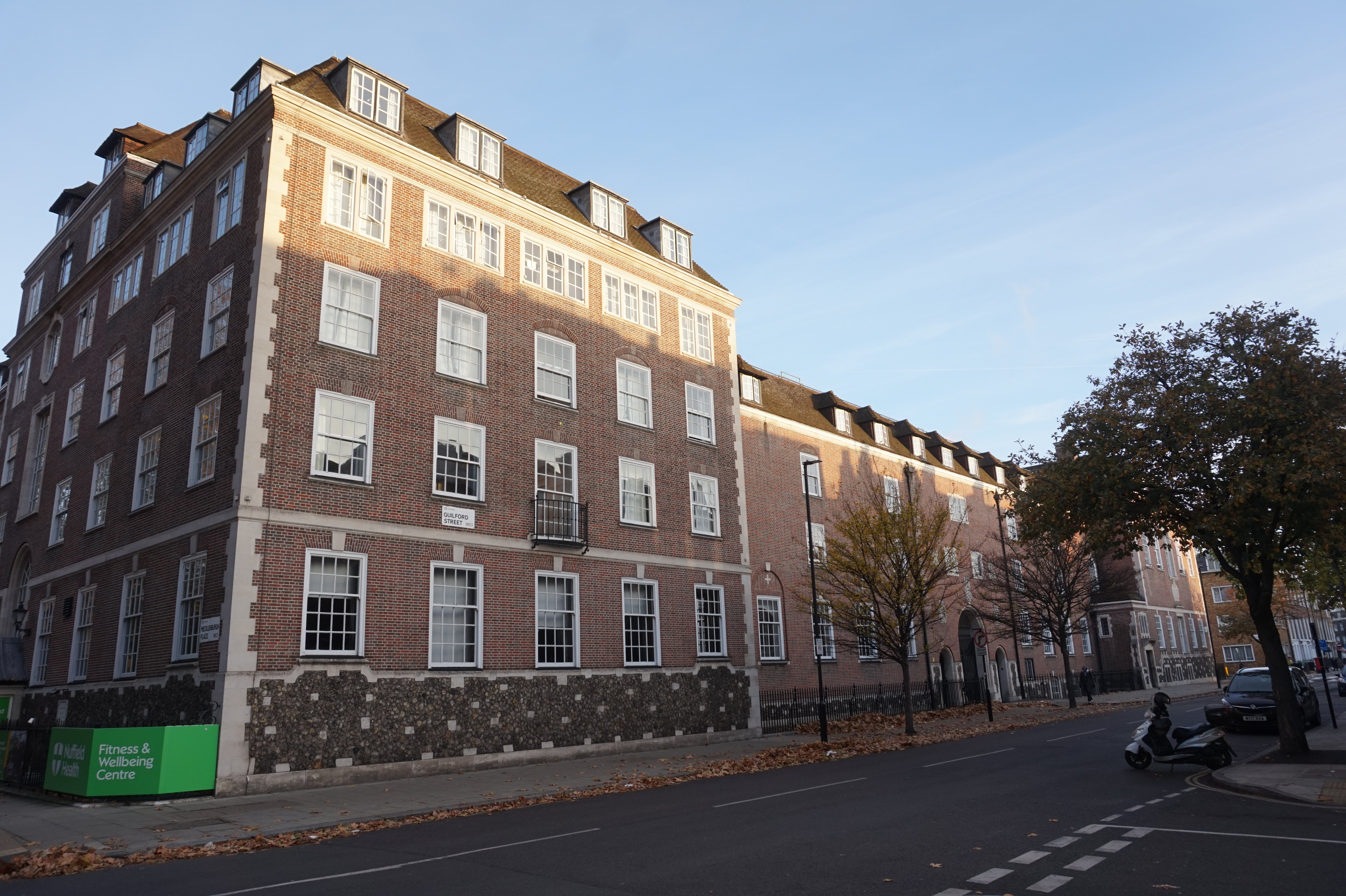
Goodenough College, London
