= Blighty Valley Cemetery =

World War I CWGC cemetery in France

Blighty Valley Cemetery, Authuille Wood
- Commonwealth War Graves Commission
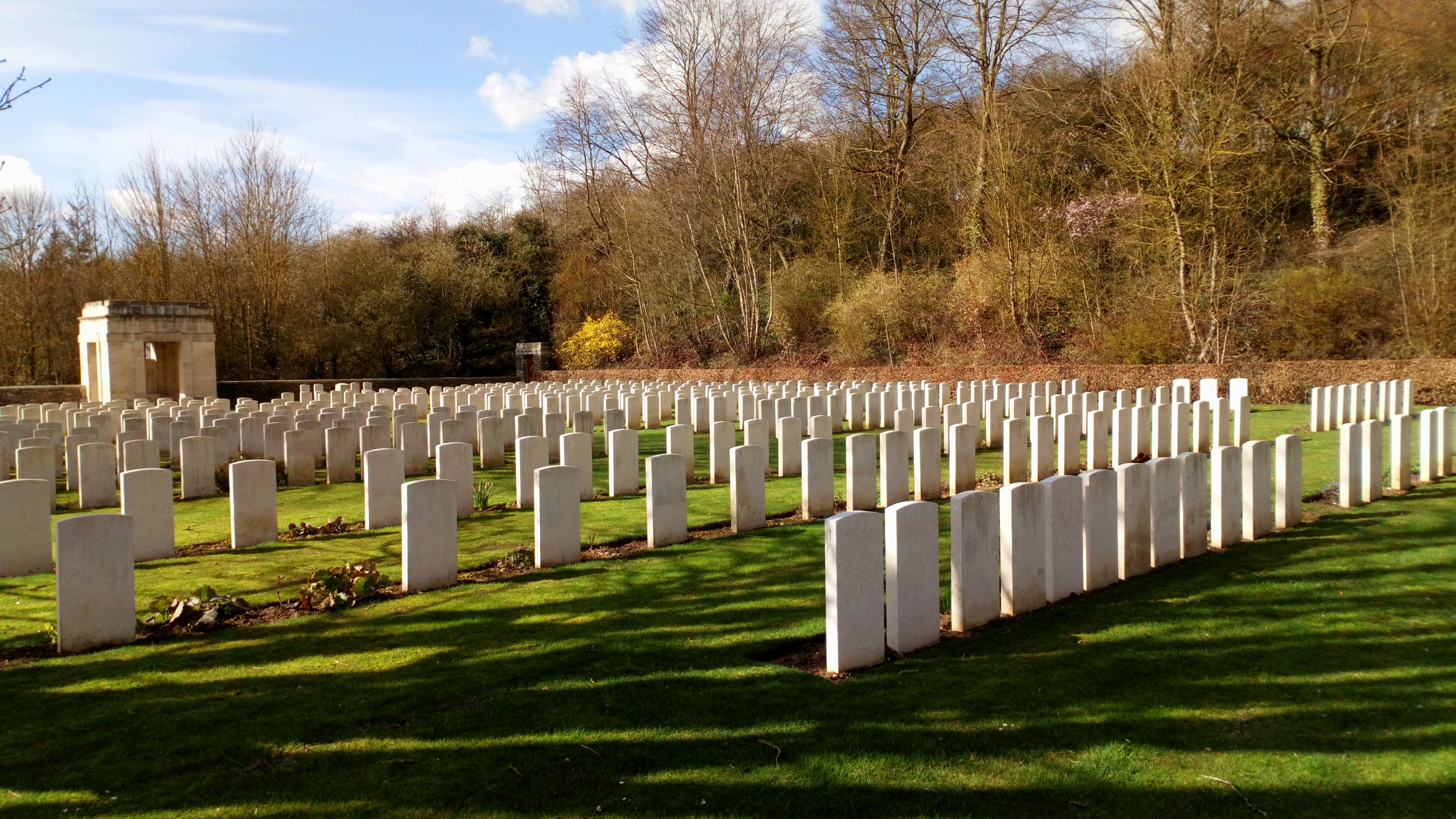
- For the dead of the Battles of the Somme of World War I
- Established: Early July 1916
- Location: 50°2′0″N 2°40′9″E near Authuille, Northern France
- Designed by: Sir Herbert Baker
- Total burials: 1,027
- Unknowns: 536

Blighty Valley Cemetery is a World War I cemetery located about 4 kilometres north-east of the town of Albert, Somme in northern France. It contains 1,027 burials and commemorations of Commonwealth soldiers who died in 1916 during the Battle of the Somme. Most of the burials are of soldiers who died on 1 July 1916, which was the first day of the Battle of Albert.

== Location ==
The Cemetery is situated in a valley between the villages of Authuille and Aveluy on the D151. The Cemetery is located about 250 metres to the east of the road, with access by way of a grass pathway.

== Historical Information ==
Blighty Valley was the name given by the Army to the lower part of the deep valley running down south-westwards through Authuille Wood to join the river between Authuille and Aveluy; a railway was carried along it soon after July, 1916, and it was for some time an important (though inevitably a dangerous) route. The upper part of the valley was called Nab Valley. Blighty Valley Cemetery is almost at the mouth of the valley, a little way up its northern bank. It is partly in either commune.

Blighty Valley Cemetery was begun early in July 1916, at the beginning of the Battle of the Somme, and used until the following November. At the Armistice it contained 212 graves but was then greatly enlarged when 784 graves were brought in from the battlefields and small cemeteries to the east. Most of these concentrated graves were of men who died on 1 July 1916.

The cemetery now contains 1,027 burials and commemorations of the First World War. 536 of the burials are unidentified but there are special memorials to 24 casualties known or believed to be buried among them, and to five others buried by the Germans in Becourt German Cemetery in the spring of 1918, whose graves could not be found on concentration.
