= Chicheley War Memorial =

Memorial in Buckinghamshire, England

Coordinates: 52.102942°N 0.680396°W

Chicheley War Memorial is located in Hall Lane, Chicheley, Buckinghamshire, England. It is a grade II listed building with Historic England. It was designed by Sir Herbert Baker and unveiled on 22 October 1920 by Lady Farrar of Chicheley Hall.
