= London Cemetery and Extension =

WWI CWGC cemetery in Somme, France

- Commonwealth War Graves Commission
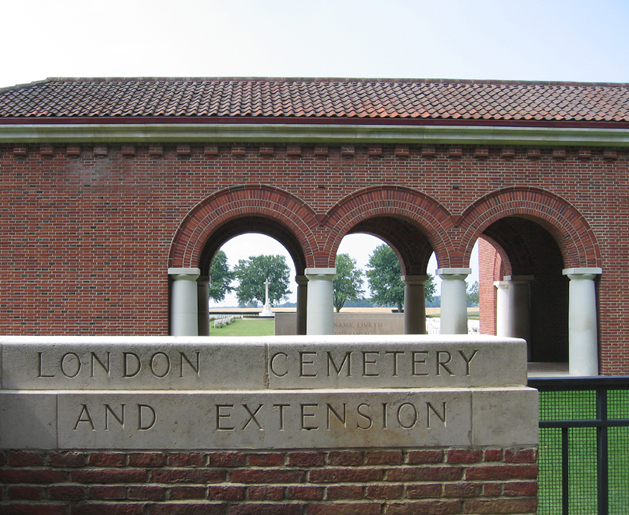
- The entrance to the London Cemetery
- For World War I and World War II deceased
- Established: 1916
- Location: 50°2′18″N 2°46′53″E near Longueval, Somme, France
- Designed by: Sir Herbert Baker
- Total burials: 4037
- Unknowns: 3113

Burials by war
- World War I – 3872 World War II – 165

The London Cemetery and Extension is a Commonwealth War Graves Commission cemetery at High Wood near Longueval, France. It is the third largest of the Somme battlefield cemeteries, containing 3,872 World War I burials.

The cemetery stands directly opposite High Wood as it exists today. This area was the centre of fierce fighting in 1916 and the first interments at what would become the London Cemetery were 47 soldiers of the 47th (London) Division killed in the Battle of Flers-Courcelette on 15 September. These soldiers, barely a handful of those who had lost their lives in the attack, were buried in a large shell hole in the days following the battle. By the time of the Armistice, further burials had taken place, bringing the number of graves to 101.

The Extension of the cemetery came in the years following the war when graves from the surrounding battlefields were transferred to the land around the London Cemetery, greatly increasing its size. Like a number of other cemeteries and memorials in the area, the London Cemetery and Extension was designed by architect Sir Herbert Baker. The original battlefield cemetery was left intact within The London Cemetery and Extension following its redesign.

Although the cemetery primarily contains World War I graves, 165 soldiers were reburied there after World War II. These graves are together in one section at the far end of the cemetery.
