= Bulls Road Cemetery =

WW1 CWGC cemetery in Somme, France

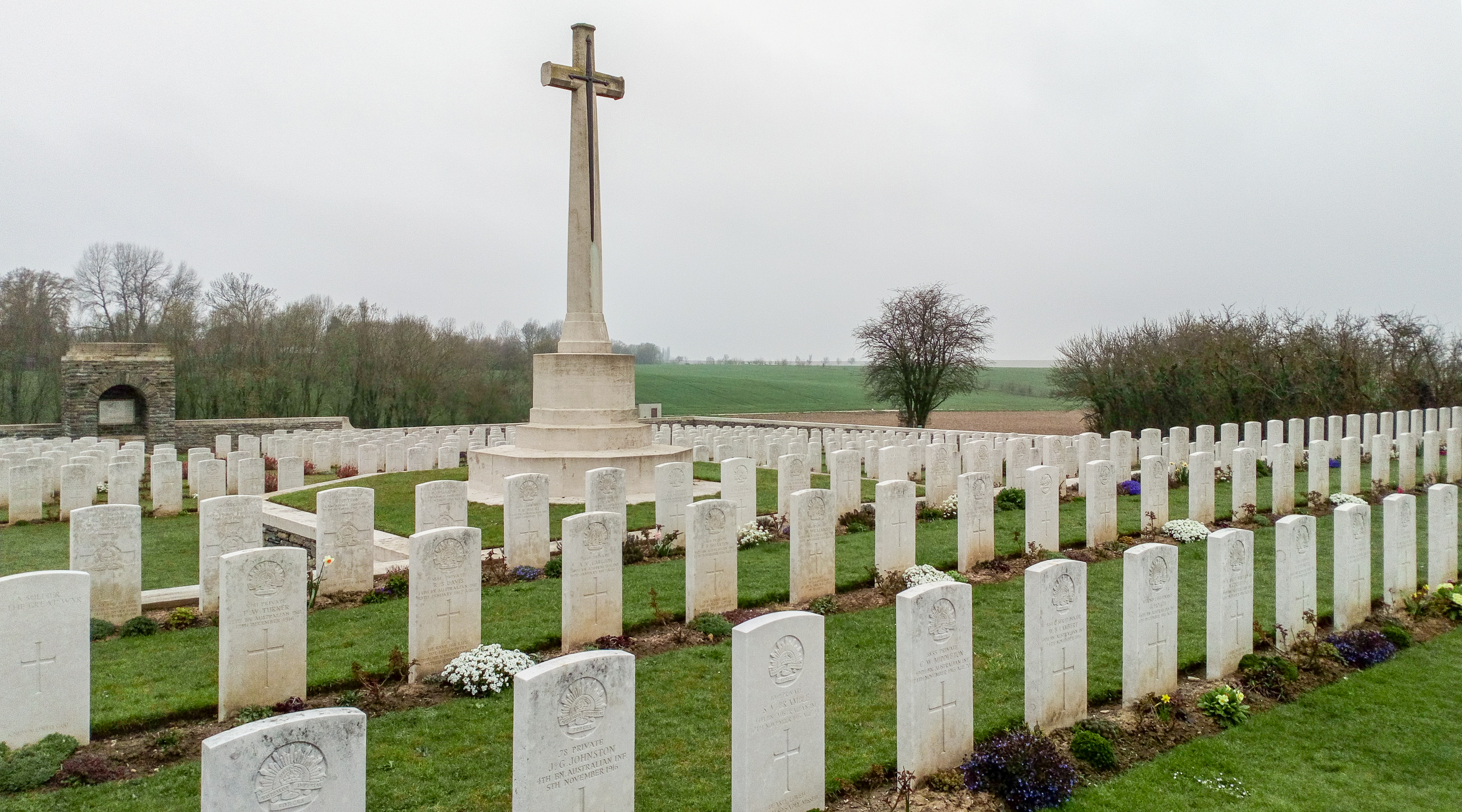
- Interactive map of Bulls Road Cemetery

Details
- Established: September 1916
- Location: Flers, Somme, France
- Country: British and Commonwealth
- Coordinates: 50°02′57″N 2°49′41″E
- Type: Military
- Owned by: Commonwealth War Graves Commission (CWGC)
- No. of graves: 776 total, 296 unidentified
- Website: Official website

The Bulls Road Cemetery is a military cemetery located in the Somme region of France commemorating British and Commonwealth soldiers who fought in the Battle of the Somme in World War I. The cemetery contains mostly those who died manning the front line near the village of Flers between September 1916 and March 1917 and between March 1918 and September 1918. The cemetery is managed by the Commonwealth War Graves Commission.

== Location ==
The cemetery is located approximately half a kilometer outside of Flers, which is approximately 8 kilometers northeast of Albert, France.

== Fighting near Bulls Road and Flers ==
Flers was captured on 15 September 1916 by the British 41st Division and New Zealand Division in the Battle of Flers-Courcelette, which was incidentally the world's first significant combat action that featured tank warfare. The village was taken by the Germans in their 1918 spring offensive, but had been retaken by the 10th West Yorks and the 6th Dorsets of the British 17th Division by the end of August 1918.

== Establishment of the Cemetery ==
The cemetery was begun on 19 September 1916 and was used by Commonwealth units, especially the Australians, until March 1917. In September 1918, the 17th division reburied soldiers killed in the previous 6 months in the cemetery. After the war, graves from fields between Flers and the village of Longueval were reburied in the cemetery. The cemetery was designed by Sir Herbert Baker.

=== Statistics ===
The cemetery contains a total of 776 burials, of which 475 are identified and 296 are unidentified. Special memorials are dedicated to 15 soldiers (8 from Australia, 5 from the UK, and 2 from New Zealand) believed to be buried among the unknown.

Known Burials by Nationality
Nationality	Number of Burials
United Kingdom	493
Australia	155
New Zealand	122

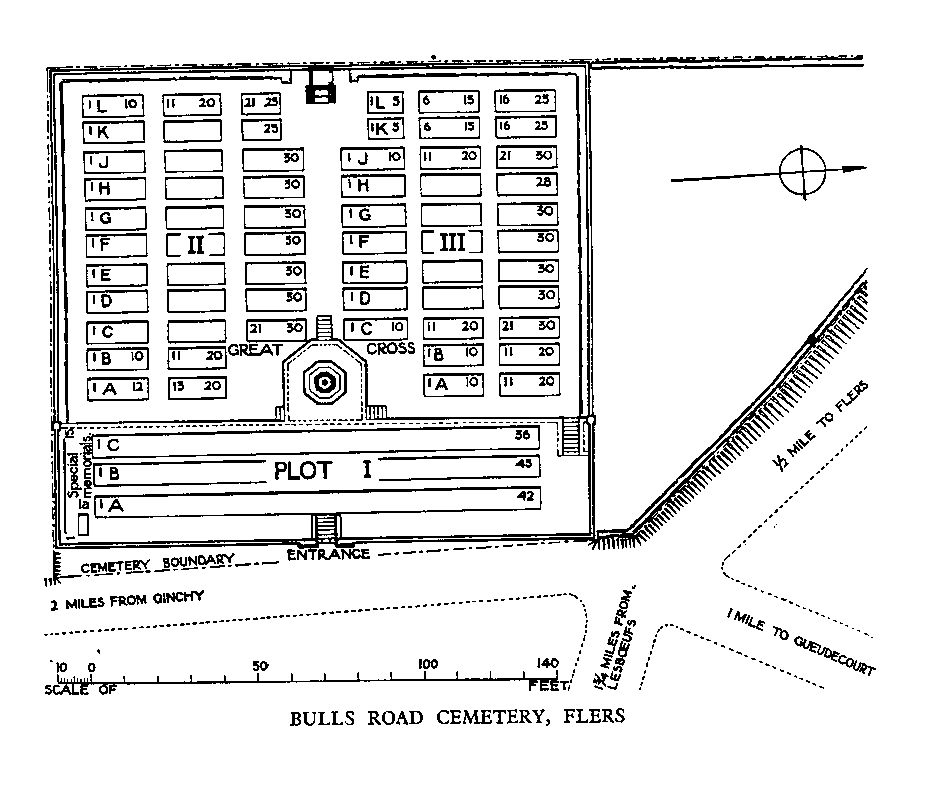
Bulls Road Cemetery Plan

Known Burials by Unit
Unit	#	Unit	#
Australian burials	155	New Zealand burials	85
King's Royal Rifle Corps	39	East Yorkshire Regiment	36
Royal West Kent Regiment	27	Hampshire Regiment	25
Dorsetshire Regiment	18	Durham Light Infantry	13
King's Liverpool Regiment	10	Royal Field Artillery	9
Lancashire Fusiliers	6	Royal Berkshire Regiment	6
Welsh Regiment	6	Manchester Regiment	4
Bedfordshire Regiment	3	Middlesex Regiment	3
Royal Sussex Regiment	3	Green Howards - Yorkshire Regiment	2
Royal Dublin Fusiliers	2	Royal Engineers	2
Royal Fusiliers – City of London Regiment	2	Royal Garrison Artillery	2
West Yorkshire Regiment	2	Worcestershire Regiment	2
London Regiment – 3rd Bn. Royal Fusiliers	1	London Regiment – 6th Bn. London Rifles	1
London Regiment – 19th Bn. St. Pancras	1	Loyal North Lancashire Regiment	1
Machine Gun Corps	1	Oxfordshire & Buckinghamshire Light Infantry	1
Queen's – Royal West Surrey Regiment	1	Royal Army Medical Corps	1
South Wales Borderers	1	Suffolk Regiment	1
Tank Corps	1	Wiltshire Regiment	1
