= Thomas Lightfoot =

South African Catholic Bishop

The Ven. Thomas Fothergill Lightfoot, B.D. (4 March 1831 – 12 November 1904) was Archdeacon of The Cape from 1895 to 1904.

Lightfoot was educated at Nottingham High School and St Augustine's College, Canterbury. Following several years as a journalist he was ordained Deacon by the Bishop of London in 1857. He went to South Africa the following year and was ordained Priest by the Bishop of Cape Town in 1859. After a curacy at St George, Cape Town he was Priest in charge of St Paul, Cape Town then Vicar general of the Anglican Diocese of Cape Town and Missionary Canon until his appointment as Archdeacon.
