= Zoo Lake =

Lake in Gauteng, South Africa

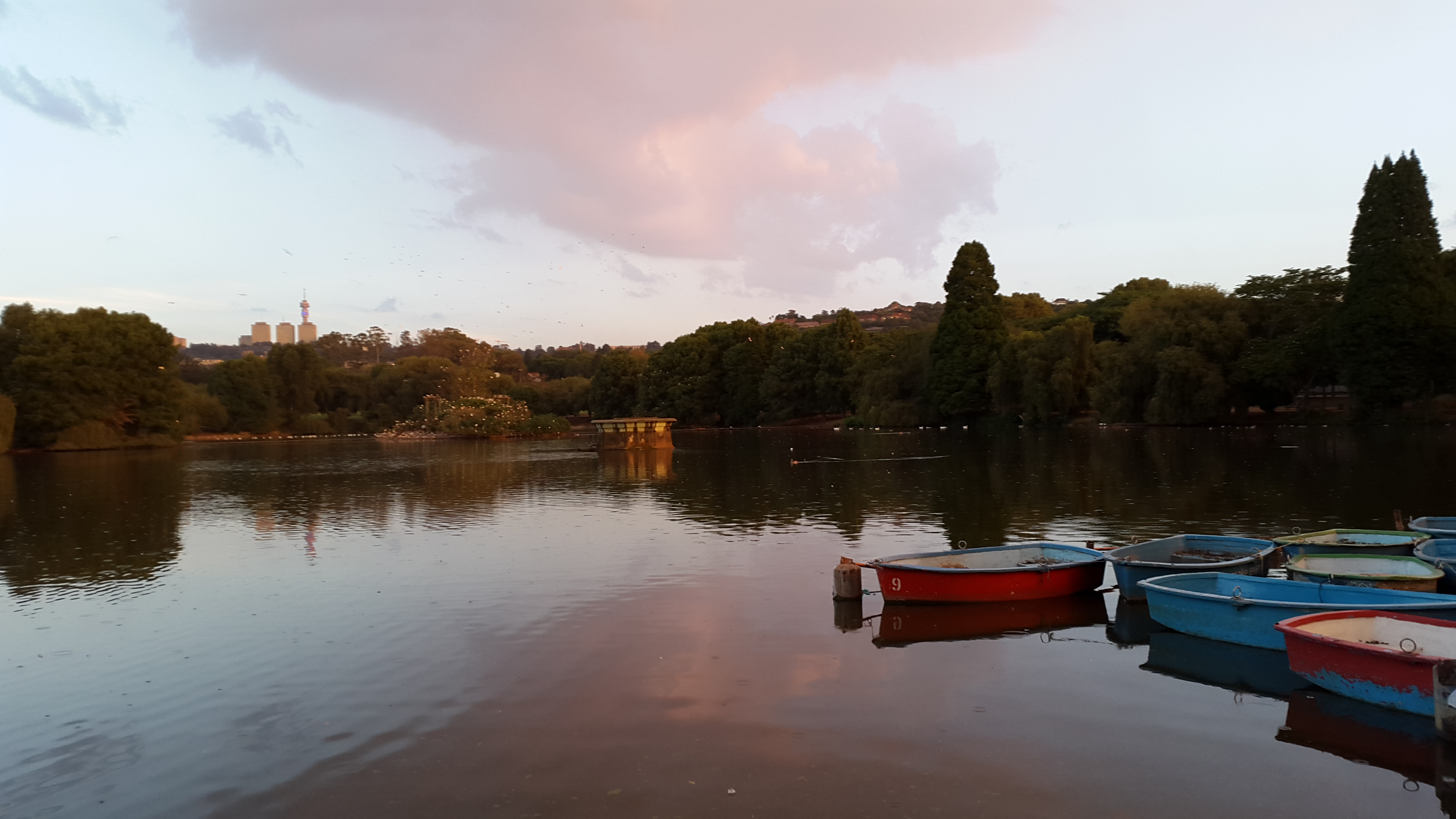

- Location within South Africa Location within Gauteng
- Location: Johannesburg, South Africa
- Coordinates: 26°09′31″S 28°01′43″E
- Primary inflows: Parktown Spruit
- Primary outflows: Parktown Spruit
- First flooded: 1908
- Surface area: 9 hectares (0.090 km^{2})

Zoo Lake is a popular lake and public park in Johannesburg, South Africa. It is part of the Hermann Eckstein Park and is opposite the Johannesburg Zoo. The Zoo Lake consists of two dams, an upper feeder dam, and a larger lower dam, both constructed in natural marshland watered by the Parktown Spruit.

== History ==
The land was originally part of the Braamfontein farm, and was bought by banker and mining magnate Hermann Eckstein for potential exploitation of minerals. When this objective failed, Eckstein laid it out as a timber plantation and named it Sachsenwald, after Otto von Bismarck’s estate in Germany. The plantation was started in 1891, and about three million trees were planted in the area. The forest became a favourite recreational spot for the wealthy Randlords and their families. About 10 years after Eckstein died, in August 1903, the Mayor of Johannesburg, W. St. John Carr, received a letter from his business partners (the firm Messrs. Wernher Beit & Co and Max Michaelis) with an offer of 200 acres of freehold ground for the Johannesburg Town Council to build the Johannesburg Zoo and the Herman Eckstein Park. The gift of land included a small Zoological Collection. 20 acres of the gifted land was to be used by the Imperial Light Horse Regiment, and is now the site of the War Museum and the Rand Regiments Memorial. The rest of the Sachsenwald land was developed into the present-day Johannesburg suburbs of Saxonwold and Forest Town.

An artificial lake was added to the Park in 1908. It also boasts the Coronation Fountain, a "musical fountain" and a Johannesburg heritage symbol, which was built in 1937 to commemorate the coronation of King George VI and Queen Elizabeth. When Johannesburg celebrated its 70 birthday in 1956, as part of the city's celebration Margot Fonteyn danced Swan Lake with the Lake as a backdrop.

The gift of land was made under the condition that the facilities were to remain open to people of all races, which was unusual in Colonial South Africa. The multi-racial nature of the Park endured throughout the Apartheid era. Later Wernher, Beit and Company would donate further land for a carriage way around the park, for carriage drives or walks and they streets would become known as Upper and Lower Park Drives.

== Amenities ==
Zoo Lake is a popular spot for picnicking, walking dogs, jogging and canoeing. There are also small boats available for hire. Zoo Lake has ducks and other waterfowl, which roost in an island at the centre of the lake, and feeding these birds (although officially discouraged) is a common family activity. However the water enters the Lake after passing through the grounds of the Zoo next door, and it is currently too polluted to permit angling or swimming. Efforts are underway to implement a sustainable eco-friendly filtration system.

The Park has restaurants, and is the venue for the annual Jazz on the Lake festival, Carols by Candlelight events and the Artists under the Sun open air art exhibition.

The precinct includes the Zoo Lake Bowling Club, the Zoo Lake Swimming Pool and the Zoo Lake Sports Club, and it is close to the South African National Museum of Military History.

== See also ==
- List of reservoirs and dams in South Africa
