= Max (gorilla) =

Western lowland gorilla

- Species: Western lowland gorilla
- Sex: Male
- Born: March 6, 1971; Frankfurt Zoo
- Died: 5 May 2004 (aged 33); Johannesburg Zoo

Max (6 March 1971 – 5 May 2004) was a western lowland gorilla held at the Johannesburg Zoo who in 1997 was shot and wounded by Isaac Mofokeng, a criminal who entered his enclosure at the zoo while attempting to evade police.

Max was born on 6 March 1971, in Germany's Frankfurt Zoo and died 5 May 2004, at the Johannesburg Zoo.

A bronze statue of Max has been erected near the gorilla enclosure in the zoo.

Makoko, a gorilla from the Münster Zoo in Germany, replaced Max as Lisa's partner.

== Shooting incident ==
On 18 July 1997, police surprised Isaac Mofokeng while committing a crime in Saxonwold next to the zoo. Trying to evade police, Mofokeng entered the zoo grounds and the enclosure where Max and his mate Lisa were held. During the confrontation between Max and Mofokeng, Mofokeng was seriously injured and Max was shot twice with a .38 revolver, one shot in the chest and the other in the neck. Three pursuing police officers were also injured during the incident, Constable Robert Tshabalala was bitten by Max on his arm and buttocks, Max broke the arm of Sergeant Rassie Rassenelebroke and Constable Amos Simelane broke his ankle. Mofokeng was eventually shot and wounded by the pursuing police.

After zoo veterinarians failed to locate and extract the bullets at the zoo hospital, Max was sent for X-rays and surgery to nearby Milpark Hospital.

Mofokeng was later convicted of rape, robbery and wounding a gorilla. He received a 40-year sentence, but died in early November 2005 while a patient at the Weskoppies Psychiatric Hospital.

== See also ==
- List of individual apes
