= Parkview, Gauteng =

Parkview
- Location within Gauteng Location within South Africa
- Coordinates: 26°10′S 28°2′E
- Country: South Africa
- Province: Gauteng
- Municipality: City of Johannesburg
- Main Place: Johannesburg

Area
  - Total: 1.68 km^{2} (0.65 sq mi)

Population (2011)
  - Total: 3,869
  - Density: 2,300/km^{2} (5,960/sq mi)

Racial makeup (2011)
  - Black African: 24.4%
  - Coloured: 2.0%
  - Indian/Asian: 5.8%
  - White: 63.9%
  - Other: 3.9%

First languages (2011)
  - English: 68.7%
  - Afrikaans: 11.1%
  - Zulu: 4.6%
  - Tswana: 3.2%
  - Other: 12.4%
- Time zone: UTC+2 (SAST)
- Postal code (street): 2193
- PO box: 2122

Parkview is a suburb of Johannesburg, South Africa. It borders the suburb of Greenside and overlooks Zoo Lake, a park which lies on the opposite side of Jan Smuts Avenue from the Johannesburg Zoo. All of its streets are named after Irish counties. Parkview is one of the oldest suburbs in Johannesburg, and much of its historic architecture remains intact. The Alliance Française in Johannesburg is situated in Parkview.

== History ==
The suburb lies on land on one of the original farms that make up Johannesburg, called Braamfontein. Its name comes from the view of the park that is now called Zoo Lake. All of the streets in Parkview are named after Irish counties. At the time of the establishment of Parkview the Mayor of Johannesburg was Irish.

== Demographics ==
As of the 2011 census, Parkview had a population of 3,869 people with a population density of 2,300 people per square kilometer. The majority of people spoke English as a first language (68.7%), with others speaking Afrikaans (11.1%), IsiZulu (4.6%), SeTswana (3.2%), or another language (12.4%) as their first language. Most people identified as white (63.9%), with others identifying as Black African (24.4%), Indian/Asian (5.8%), Coloured (2.0%), or other (3.9%).

== Facilities ==
=== Education ===
Schools in the area include Parkview Junior School, Parkview Senior Primary School, Parktown High School for Girls, Jan Celliers Laerskool and Kairos School of Inquiry. The suburb is also known for many of its pre-primaries, Parkview Pre-Primary being the oldest, established in 1958.

=== Library ===
The Parkview Library, established in 1962, is a public library serving primarily the Parkview community, and the greater Johannesburg metro as a whole. The library is situated on the corner of Tyrone avenue and Athlone road. In addition to an outdoor playground, the library has a range of fiction and non fiction books, a children’s section, reference resources, regular programming, computers, and access to free Wi-Fi. More than 2,500 people actively borrow from this Region B library. The library receives funding through the Friends of the Library organization, which holds book sales and other fundraisers to support the library.

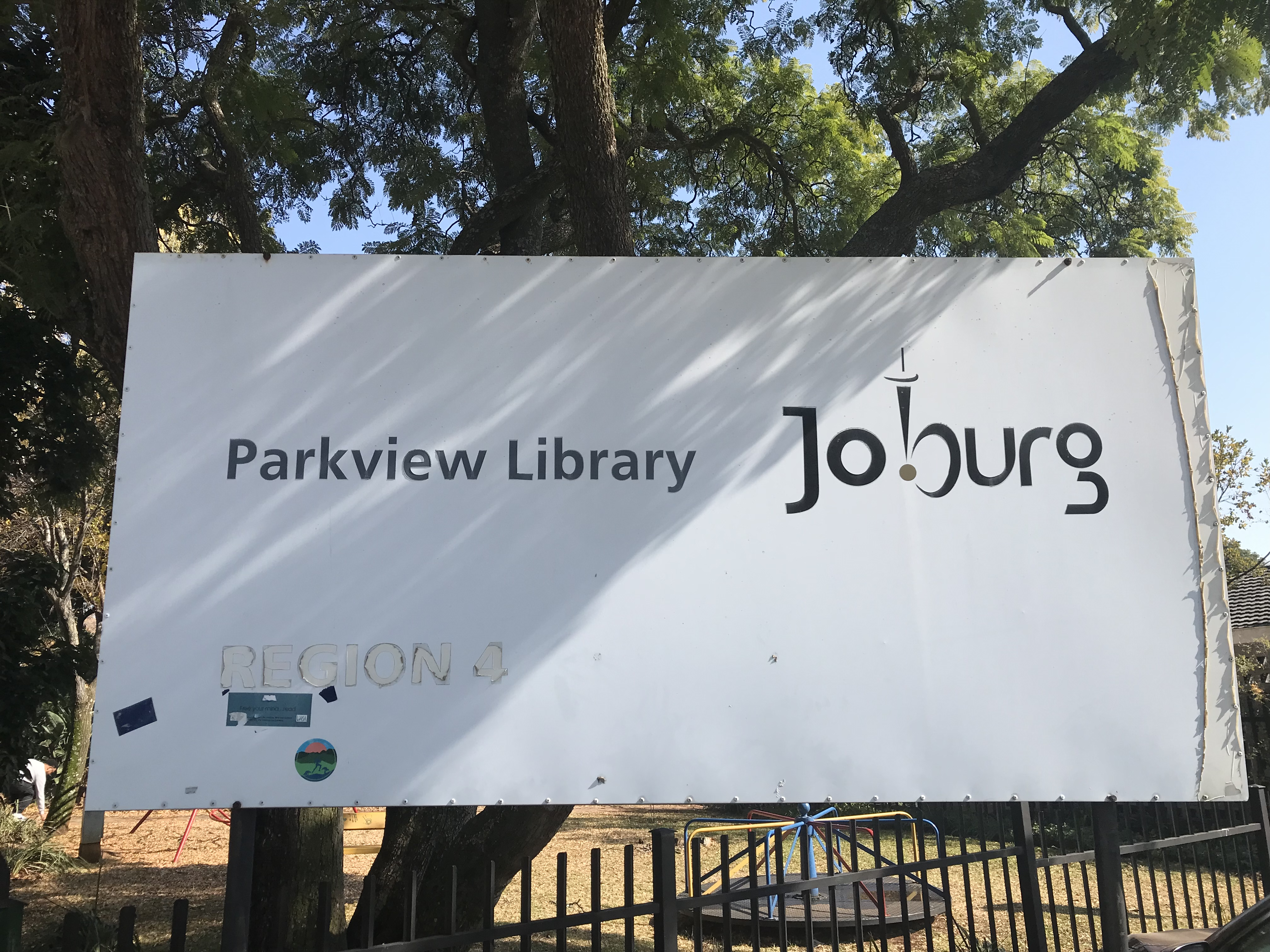

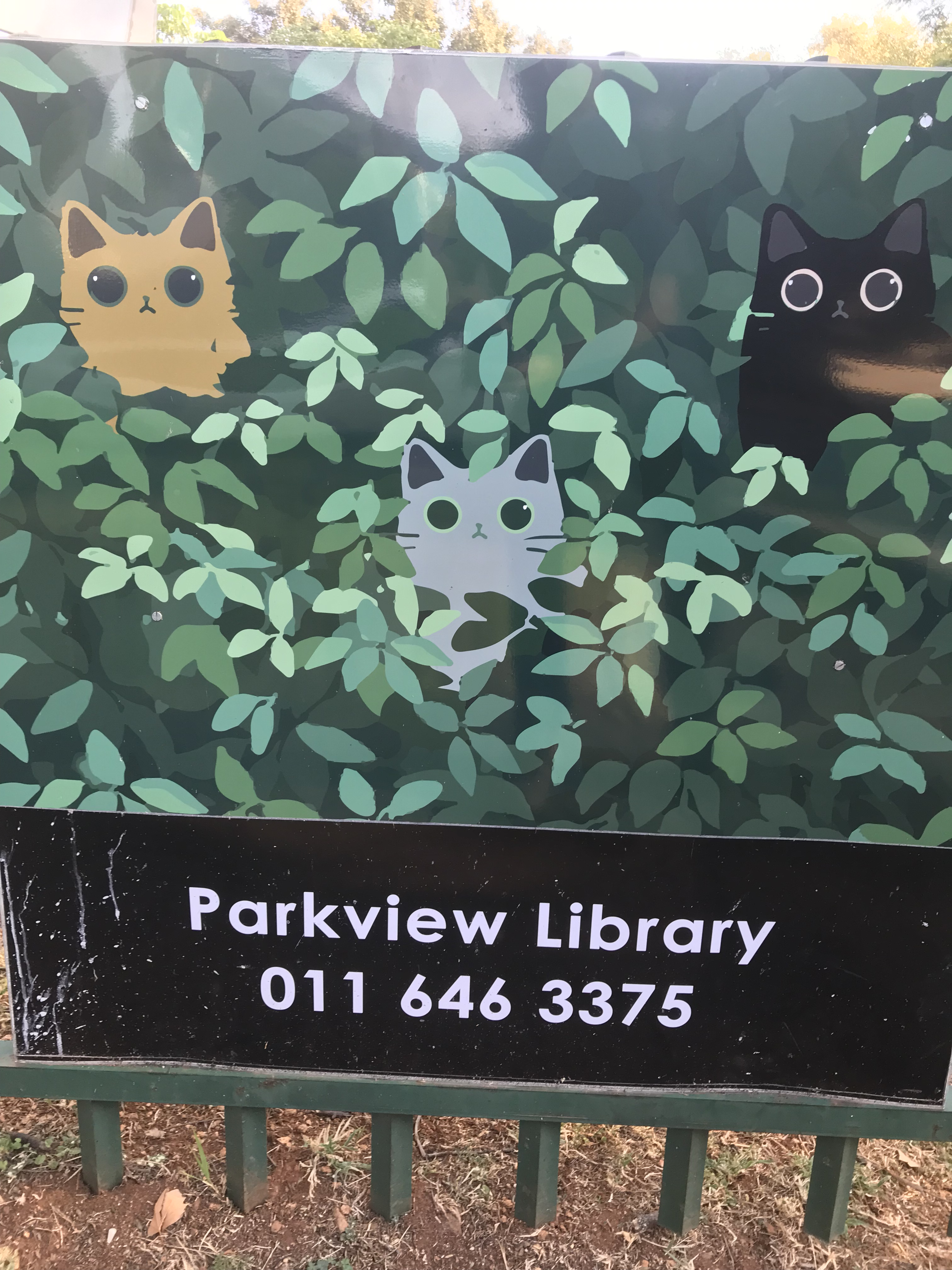

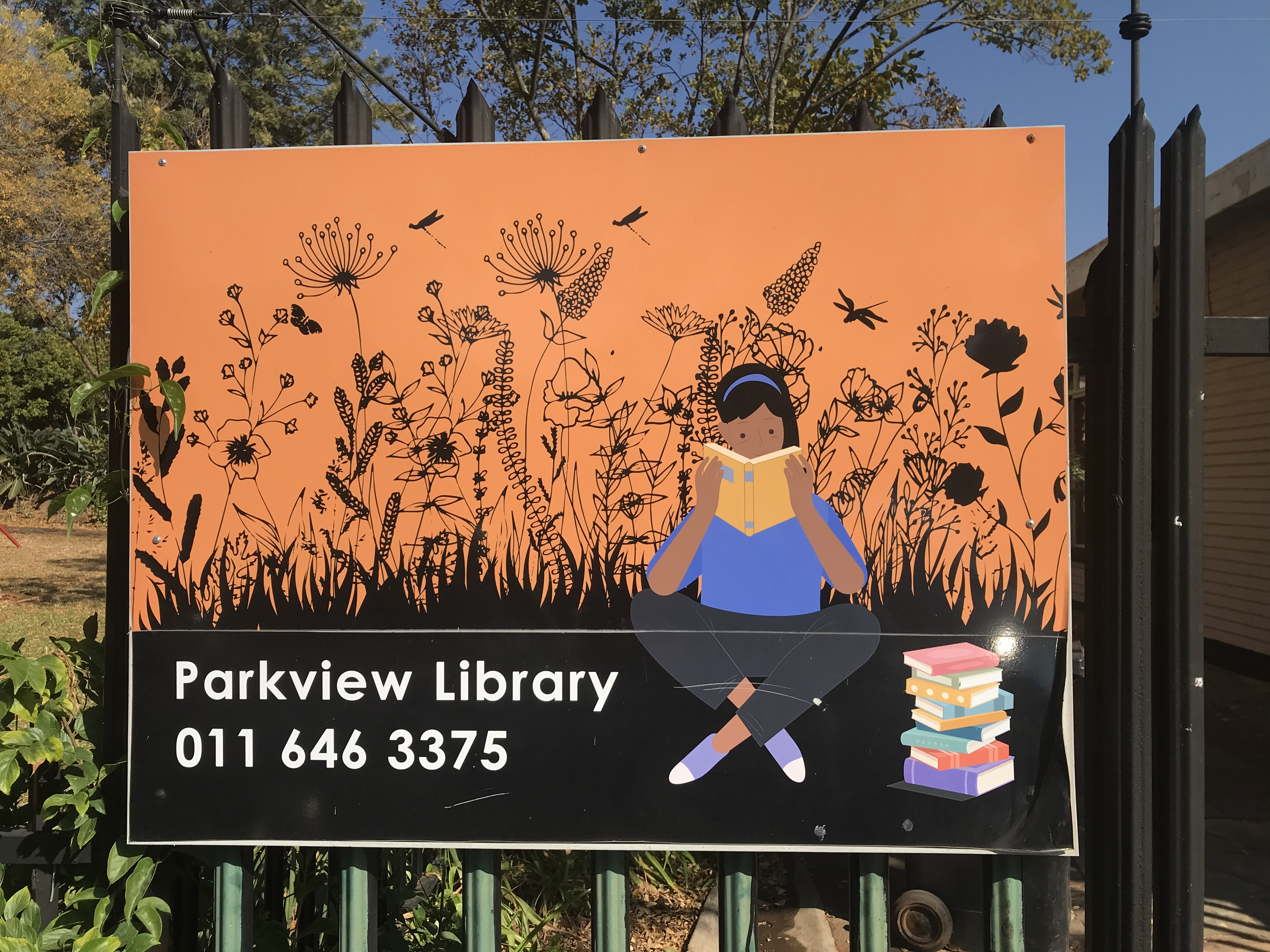
