= Otto Beit =

German-British financier

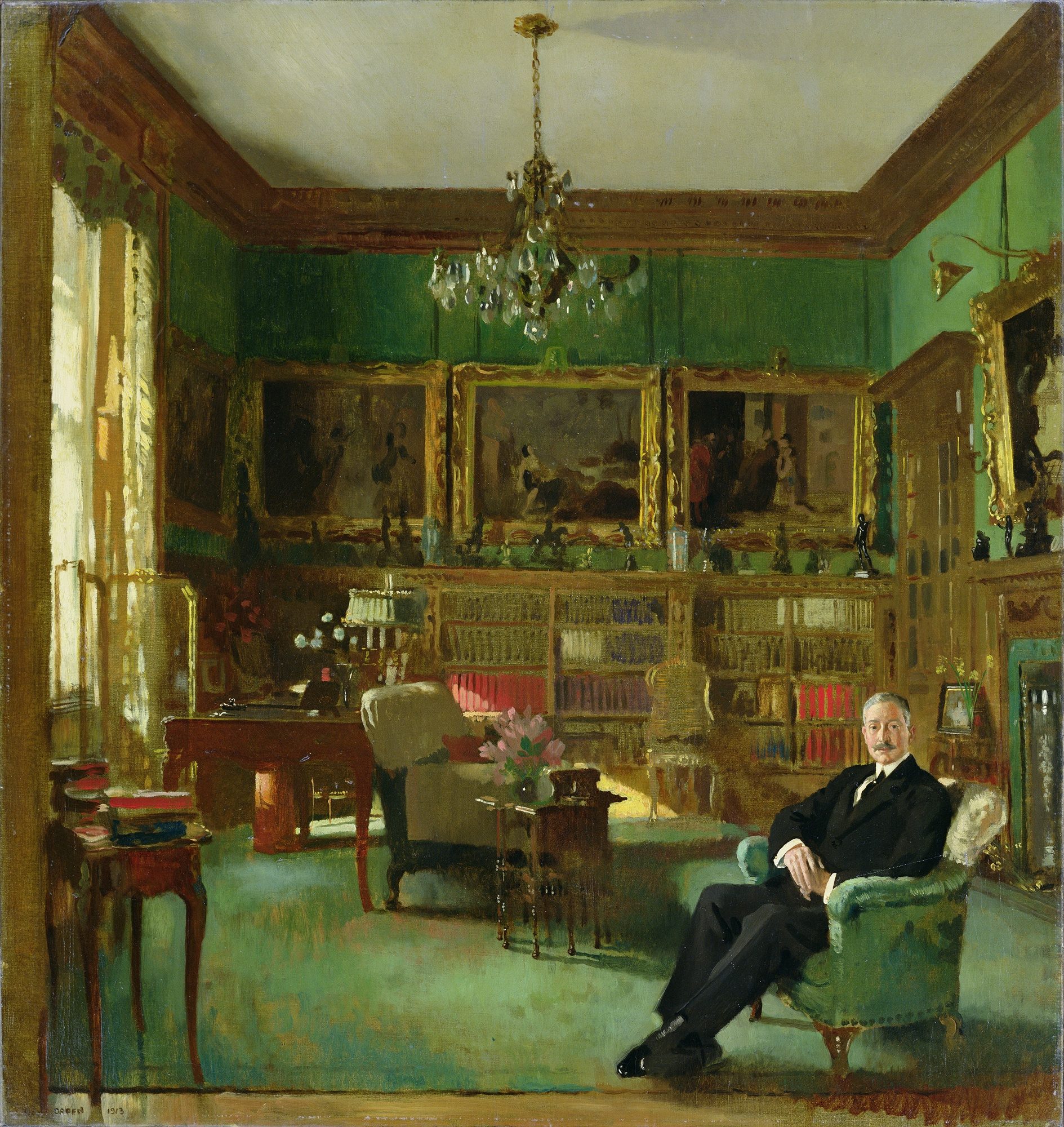
Sir Otto Beit in his study at Belgrave Square by William Orpen, 1913, Johannesburg Art Gallery

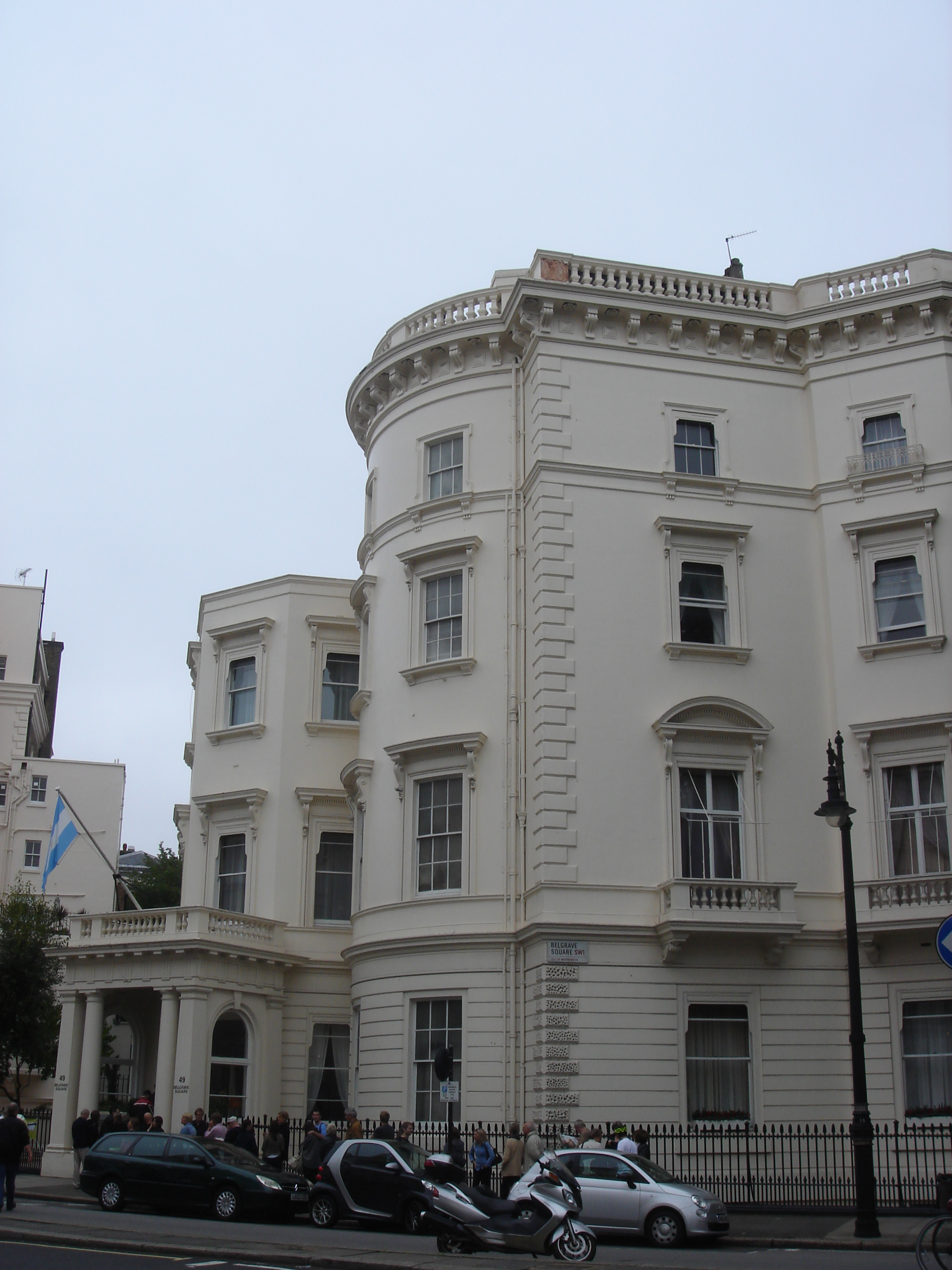
49 Belgrave Square, Beit's London house

Sir Otto John Beit, 1st Baronet, KCMG, FRS (7 December 1865 – 7 December 1930) was a German-born British financier, philanthropist, and art connoisseur.

== Life history and career ==
Beit was born in Hamburg, Germany, the younger brother of Alfred Beit, into the Jewish family of an affluent Hamburg trader. He went to England in 1888, where he joined the stockbroking firm of Wernher, Beit & Co., in which Alfred Beit was a partner. In 1890 he left for South Africa to gain experience in the diamond industry. He remained for six years and played an active role in the development of Rand Gold Mines and became a member of Hermann Eckstein's firm, H. Eckstein & Co.

Despite playing a prominent part in the Witwatersrand gold industry, Beit returned to London, partly because he did not want to confine his interests solely to financial activities, but also cultivate his scientific, artistic, and cultural tastes. He became a naturalized British citizen in 1896.

Beit aligned himself with Cecil Rhodes's imperialist vision and was his house-guest at the time of the Jameson Raid. On his return to London, he followed for a few years the career of a stockbroker and continued with his interest in the mining industry until the death of his brother Alfred, after which he retired and devoted himself for the remainder of his life to philanthropy.

== Directorates and memberships ==
Director, Rhodesia Railways Ltd; Member, Governing Body of Imperial College, 1912–1930; Trustee of the Rhodes Trust, and Beit Railway Trust for Rhodesia; founded Beit Memorial Trust for Medical Research; established the Beit Fellowship at Imperial College in memory of his brother Alfred, 1913; founded the Beit Fellowships for Scientific Research at Imperial College. He was also a member of the Governing Body from 1912 and a founder member of the Royal Institute of International Affairs.

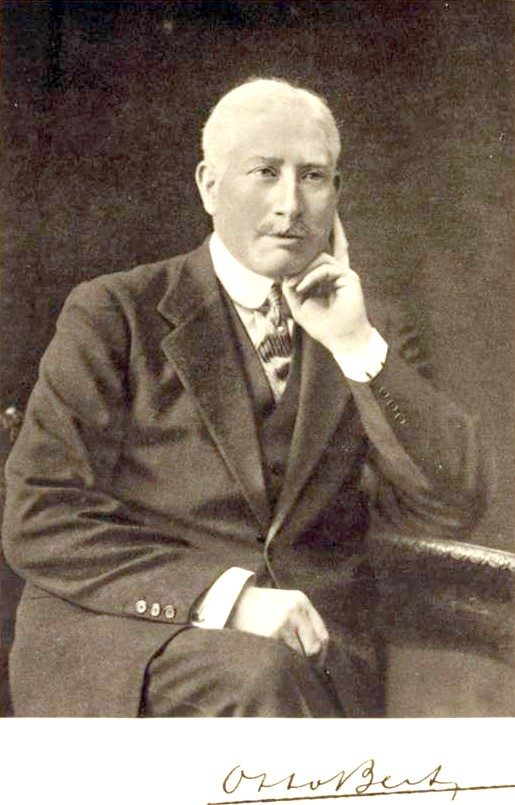
Sir Otto John Beit, 1st Baronet

He administered both the Rhodes Trust and the Beit Trust, through which he became involved in land settlement schemes in Southern Africa. He served as director of the British South Africa Company. He was appointed Knight Commander of the Order of St Michael and St George (KCMG) in the 1920 New Year Honours for his work in connection with South African troops and hospitals in England and was created a baronet on 25 February 1924 for his numerous donations to children's sanatoria, libraries and a homoeopathic research institute. He funded the construction of the Beit Quad, the Students' Union building and hostel at Imperial College, London. A plaque depicting him by Omar Ramsden is situated in the Beit Quad entrance. He was a generous benefactor of the Johannesburg Art Gallery, and more so with his gifts to the University of Cape Town, of which he turned the first sod in 1920. King Edward's Hospital Fund received £50,000 from Beit in 1928 for the purchase of radium.

Beit was no less generous to public collections in the United Kingdom, helping the Victoria and Albert Museum to acquire many works of art. He gave his name to an award for excellence in sculpture through the Royal Society of British Sculptors, the Otto Beit Medal.

He received an Honorary LLD from the University of Cape Town and was elected Fellow of the Royal Society (FRS) in 1924.

On 27 May 1897, he married Lilian Carter, the daughter of Thomas Lane Carter of New Orleans, Louisiana, US. They had two sons and two daughters, the elder son Theodore killing himself in 1917 and the younger being Alfred Lane Beit.

Baronetage of the United Kingdom
New creation	Baronet of Tewin Water; 1924–1930	Succeeded by Alfred Lane Beit
