= Jim B. Taylor =

South African randlord (1860-1944)

James Benjamin Taylor (December 1860 – 25 December 1944) was a South African Randlord. He followed a typical route to great wealth – diamonds in Kimberley, gold in Barberton and Pilgrim's Rest, and ending up on the Witwatersrand in Johannesburg. His ability to speak Afrikaans was instrumental in his rise, and he became a confidant of President Paul Kruger of the Zuid-Afrikaansche Republiek. He acted as intermediary between the Government and the mining industry, and was privy to many of the political machinations leading to the Jameson Raid and the Anglo-Boer War.

== Life ==
He was born the fifth of 8 children of Isaac Rowland Taylor (6 November 1826 Holborn – 22 August 1888 Kimberley) and Jane Dorothea Hellet (7 May 1827 – 27 November 1876). His first formal education was at Dalton School in Cape Town; he was present when in 1867 Prince Alfred, son of Queen Victoria, called at the Cape aboard the screw frigate HMS Galatea on his voyage around the world.

Taylor's father and brother moved to Du Toits Pan, later called Kimberley in 1870 when news of the diamond find spread, and the following year the family joined them, travelling from Cape Town on a mule wagon, a journey that took a month. Taylor and his brother Bill spent the next few years labouring with their parents while they worked the claim. It was during this period that he first met Rhodes, who had contracted to pump water from Baxter's Gully close to the Taylor diggings.

The increasing depth of the diggings coupled with the hard blue layers encountered in the kimberlite pipes, discouraged many miners from continuing. This together with the falling price of diamonds, led to extensive selling of the claims to the larger syndicates. This consolidation gave rise to the growth in power and wealth of Rhodes, Barnato and Alfred Beit.

Jim Taylor's lack of schooling was a cause for concern with his parents, so that in 1873 he was sent to Greytown in Natal to further his education. His uncle Peter Hellet, a sibling of Taylor's mother, lived in Greytown and it was felt that he could offer the necessary substitute for parental care. Taylor was accordingly enrolled at the German mission school at Hermannsburg. Holidays were spent with his relatives, the Menne family who owned a swathe of land along the Umvoti River. Peter Hellet died in 1874 cutting short Taylor's planned education and forcing his return to Kimberley. The Taylor family ran into financial difficulties, and Jim Taylor found a job as assistant bookkeeper with the firm of E.W. Tarry.

In 1878 Taylor accompanied a trader Finnaughty on a trip to Kuruman and beyond. On returning to Kimberley he volunteered to join the Kimberley Artillery to subdue two Griqua chiefs whose followers had been murdering and plundering in the country around the Langeberg Mountains near Griquatown. This they managed with the help of the Kimberley Light Horse and the Kimberley Infantry. In 1879, having acquired a taste for exploration, Taylor joined Gus Fisher, a retired naval officer, on a journey to Spelonken in the Northern Transvaal.

Piet Buyskes, a noted lawyer of the period, invited Taylor along on a trip to hear the grievances of Gasibone, a chief of the Batlapin or Tlhaping tribe and to relay these grievances to the British government. Paul Kruger on hearing about this, invited Buyskes to hear his own grievances against the Cape government in connection with the annexation of the Transvaal, which he also wanted communicated to London. They met Kruger near Rustenburg and Taylor was present when they appointed a committee charged with having the independence of the Transvaal restored.

On Taylor's return to Kimberley, he took his first steps in diamond broking by joining Alfred Beit, a partner of Jules Porgès. Alfred Beit was at that time the leading diamond merchant in Kimberley and had established a reputation for being scrupulously fair in all his business dealings. However, he fell under the spell of Rhodes's imperial vision, whereas his partner Julius Wernher did not.

Taylor's brother Bill went to London in 1880 to establish an agency. Jim Taylor followed a year later, visiting his ancestral country for the first time, and taking the opportunity of doing the Grand Tour. He returned to Kimberley in 1882 to find that a slumping market had financially crippled him.

== Family ==
Taylor was married in Johannesburg on 10 March 1891 to Mary "Mollie" Gordon (*August 1863 Ballater, Scotland), daughter of a Pietermaritzburg physician. They produced a family of four children:

1. Alfred Gordon Taylor (*1892) Lost a leg in the Great War of 1914/18. In the Second World War, as Major Gordon Taylor, he achieved distinction as one of S Africa's most famous war artists – his paintings are in the SA War Museum – and later was a popular painter of thoroughbred racehorses.
2. Frances Daphne Taylor (*1895) x Francis Heyberger, French aero engineer. Winner of the Prix de Rome at the Slade and distinguished S African artist, she and Francis escaped wartime France via the Pyrenees and emigrated to America
3. Lance Taylor (*1901–1978) x Catherine Dorothea Sharpe later Mrs Catherine Taylor, Member of Parliament in the S African House of Assembly. Lance qualified as a doctor at St Thomas' Hospital in London during the Blitz, joined the Royal Army Medical Corps and served in the D-Day landings, later travelling to S Africa with his family to settle at the Cape. He was an Honorary Vice President of the Western Province Cricket Club and a distinguished local golfer.
4. Iris Dorothea Taylor (*1903 – 5 September 1973) x Lt.-Col. Harold Boyd-Rochfort, brother of the Queen's racehorse trainer, Cecil Boyd-Rochfort. Iris became one of Ireland's leading bloodstock breeders and ran the Middleton Stud in Mullingar for many years in partnership with Mrs 'Kicks' Erlanger, wife of Micky Erlanger, the founder of the Piper Aircraft Company, who lived in Monmouth, New Jersey, US.
