= John Trathen =

John Vernon Trathen, MBE was Archdeacon of Kroonstad from 1968 to 1973.

Trathen served in the RNVR during World War II. He was ordained in 1962. After a curacy in Bloemfontein he held incumbencies at Springfontein, Harrismith and Parkview.
