= The Cenotaph, Johannesburg =

War memorial in Johannesburg, South Africa

The Cenotaph
- South Africa
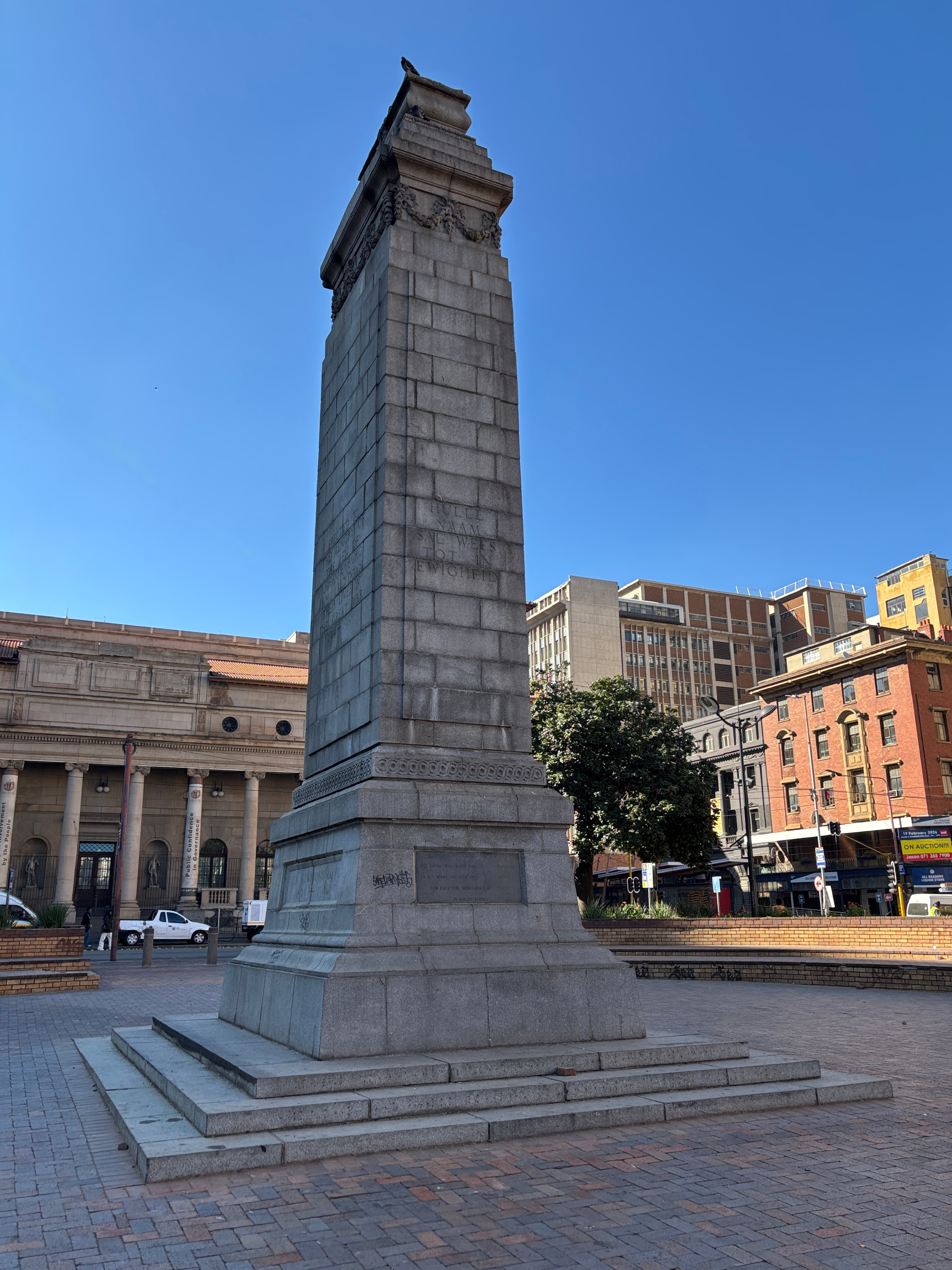
- The Cenotaph in 2026
- For all those who made the supreme sacrifice in all wars, battles and armed struggles for freedom, democracy and peace in South Africa
- Unveiled: 10 October 1926
- Location: 26°12′16″S 28°02′24″E; Johannesburg

The Cenotaph is a war memorial located in Beyers Naudé Square in Johannesburg CBD. It was dedicated in 1926 as a memorial to men from Johannesburg who were killed during the First World War. Since 2002 it has commemorated all people killed fighting for freedom and democracy in South Africa. The Cenotaph was the venue for the annual national Remembrance Sunday ceremony between 1926 and 2022 and has been used for other services and events.

== History ==
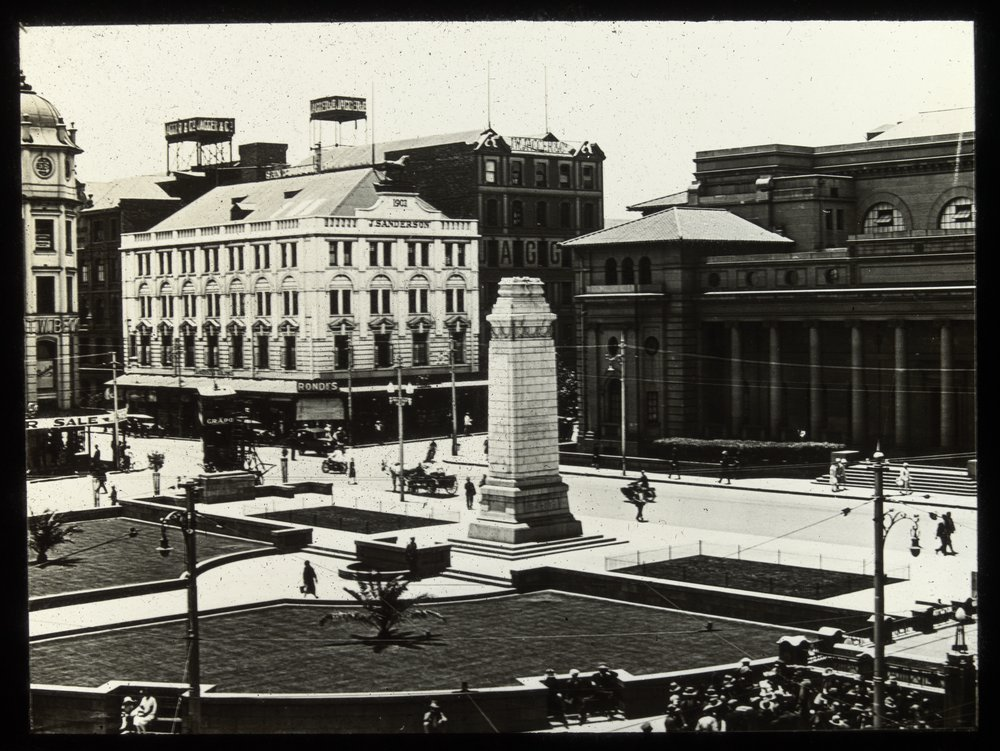
The Cenotaph and surrounding buildings in the 1920s

The Cenotaph was dedicated by the-then Governor-General of South Africa, Alexander Cambridge, 1st Earl of Athlone, on 10 October 1926. This ceremony was attended by a large crowd and took place at the same time as the Delville Wood South African National Memorial in France was being dedicated by a delegation led by Prime Minister J. B. M. Hertzog.

The memorial was originally dedicated to "the memory of the men of Johannesburg who laid down their lives in the Great War". In 1947 another inscription was added in memory of "Our glorious dead 1939-1945". In 2002 the City of Johannesburg added an inscription dedicating the Cenotaph to "all those who made the supreme sacrifice in all wars, battles and armed struggles for freedom, democracy and peace in South Africa", with this being dedicated on 10 November that year.

The Mail & Guardian reported in 2005 that there were calls to move the Cenotaph to a location near the Anglo-Boer War Memorial in the suburb of Saxonwold.

== Commemoration and other events ==
The official national service held to mark Remembrance Sunday was held at the Cenotaph in Johannesburg annually from 1926. In 2023 the City of Johannesburg stated that it did not have a budget for the Cenotaph. The Memorable Order of Tin Hats, a veterans' organisation, organised a replacement service at the Anglo-Boer War Memorial. The City of Johannesburg jointly hosted a Remembrance Sunday service with a veterans' organisation at the Anglo-Boer War Memorial in 2025 and 2026.

The Torch Commando held the first of its protests against oppressive actions by the National Party government, including the Separate Representation of Voters Act, at the Cenotaph on 21 April 1951. At this protest a South African flag was placed over a coffin to symbolise the death of the Constitution of South Africa due to the removal of Cape Coloured voting rights and other abuses of state power and racism. Approximately 3,000 white ex-servicemen attended this protest.
