= Hermann Eckstein =

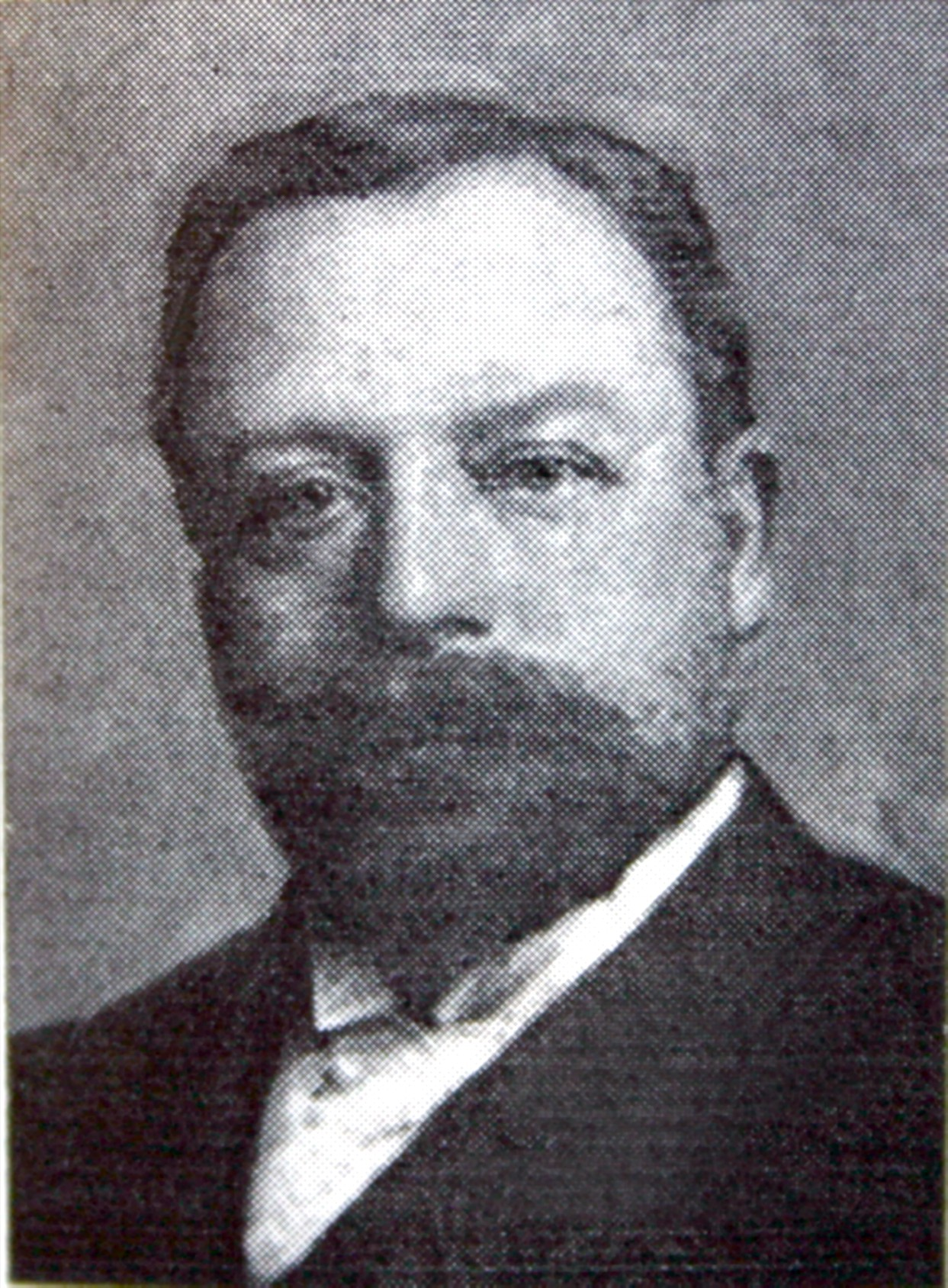
- Born: August 3, 1847
- Died: January 16, 1893 (aged 45)
- Occupation: Banker

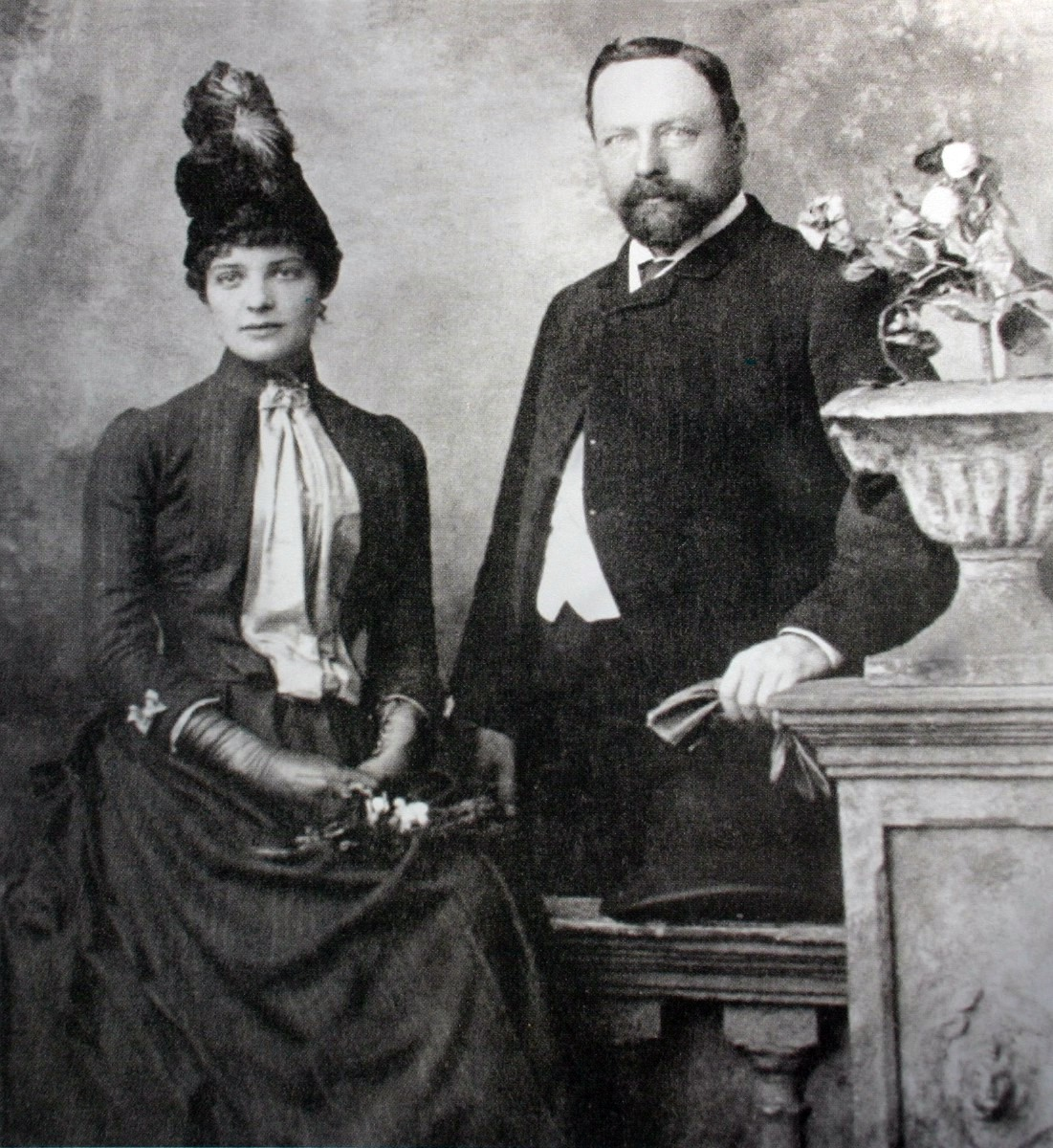
Hermann Eckstein & wife Minnie c1880

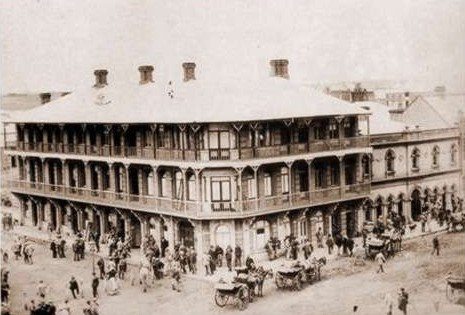
The second Corner House, Johannesburg c1890

Hermann Ludwig Eckstein (3 August 1847 – 16 January 1893) was a German-born British mining magnate and banker. He was instrumental in the development of gold mining in South Africa, the South African Chamber of Mines, and the National Bank of the South African Republic.

== Life history ==
Born in Hohenheim near Stuttgart, Germany to a Lutheran minister, he received an excellent education. He came to the South African diamond- and goldfields in 1882, and soon acquired a reputation as the resourceful manager of the Phoenix Diamond Mining Company at Du Toit's Pan near Kimberley. He attracted the attention of Julius Wernher and Alfred Beit and in 1884 joined them in the partnership of Jules Porgès & Co (later Wernher, Beit & Co).

In 1885, Beit arranged for Hermann Eckstein and Jim Taylor to report on the firm's interests in the Barberton and De Kaap goldfields, in which they had invested heavily. Taylor wrote a gloomy report on the extent and quality of the ore lode that brought Porgès hurrying back to South Africa. He and Beit decided to disinvest. The firm suffered a loss, which was trivial compared with what was to follow. The soaring share prices during the boom were rapidly followed by pessimism, plummeting prices and widespread bankruptcy. Just before the collapse there had been rumours of enormous deposits of gold on the Witwatersrand, about 60 km south of Pretoria. These rumours had reached Porgès and Beit whilst visiting government offices in Pretoria. Initially discounted, they had proved to be true. Beit hurriedly acquired extensive mining rights in Johannesburg.

In 1888, Eckstein started his own firm under the name of Hermann Eckstein & Co., in the Corner House as a representative of Jules Porgès. He was instrumental in establishing the Chamber of Mines in Johannesburg in 1889, and acted as its first president until 1892. Eckstein put the infrastructure of the mines on a solid footing by using competent engineers, thus turning mere diggings into established industry. He was involved in the move to deep level mining when the surface deposits had run out. By the end of 1888, he was in charge of virtually all the mining activities in the central area of the Witwatersrand, and controlled the eleven most important syndicates. He played an important role in the founding of the Wanderers Club and is considered one of the Randlords.

Eckstein was dismayed by the growing rift between the Uitlanders and Afrikaners, more so since he counted Paul Kruger as a personal friend. He played a large part in establishing the National Bank of the South African Republic. The year before his death he went to England, having been offered a partnership with Wernher and Beit in the Central Mining and Investment Corporation. He left Johannesburg in 1892 with his wife who was pregnant with their fourth child, but didn't live long enough to see its birth. On 16 January 1893 he died of "apoplexy of the heart", probably a heart attack. His brother Frederick took over the family interests and in 1910 rebuilt Ottershaw Park in Surrey which at the time was described as the 'Wonder House of Surrey'.

== Sachsenwald ==
Beit's company planted some three million trees on an area of 1,300 acres (5.3 km^{2}), an area Eckstein called Sachsenwald, now known as the Johannesburg suburbs of Saxonwold and Forest Town, the Zoo Lake and Johannesburg Zoo. The forest became a favourite recreational spot for the wealthy Randlords and their families.

Ten years after his death, and in his memory, his former partners made a gift to Johannesburg of the Sachsenwald, later named the Hermann Eckstein Park. This Deed of Gift read: "Whereas the late Hermann Eckstein was in his lifetime a resident in the town of Johannesburg and always took a deep interest in its advancement and prosperity, and played an active part in many schemes and undertakings for its improvement and whereas it has appeared to us that the dedication of a suitable area of land for the use of the public of Johannesburg, as a public park, would have met with the cordial approval of our late friend and will be acceptable to fellow townsmen." The Deed was signed by Julius Wernher, Alfred Beit, Lionel Phillips, Ludwig Breitmeyer, Friedrich Eckstein (his brother), Charles Rube and Ludwig Wagner.

== Epilogue ==
"Eckstein's skill in financial transactions and his unimpeachable integrity made him a respected man in a community where dishonesty was rife. He became a leading figure in the Johannesburg mining industry." - South African Dictionary of National Biography.

Eckstein was a founding member of the Rand Club, an exclusive club created for the use of the Randlords, and first president of the Wanderers' Club.

== Sources ==
- Article on Hermann Eckstein
- Chamber of Mines article
- Biography of Jules Porgès
