= Sir Alfred Beit, 2nd Baronet =

British politician and philanthropist (1903–1994)

- Beit in 1944
- Born: 19 January 1903; London, England
- Died: 12 May 1994 (aged 91); Dublin, Ireland
- Occupations: Art collector Politician
- Parent: Otto Beit (father)
- Relatives: Alfred Beit (uncle)

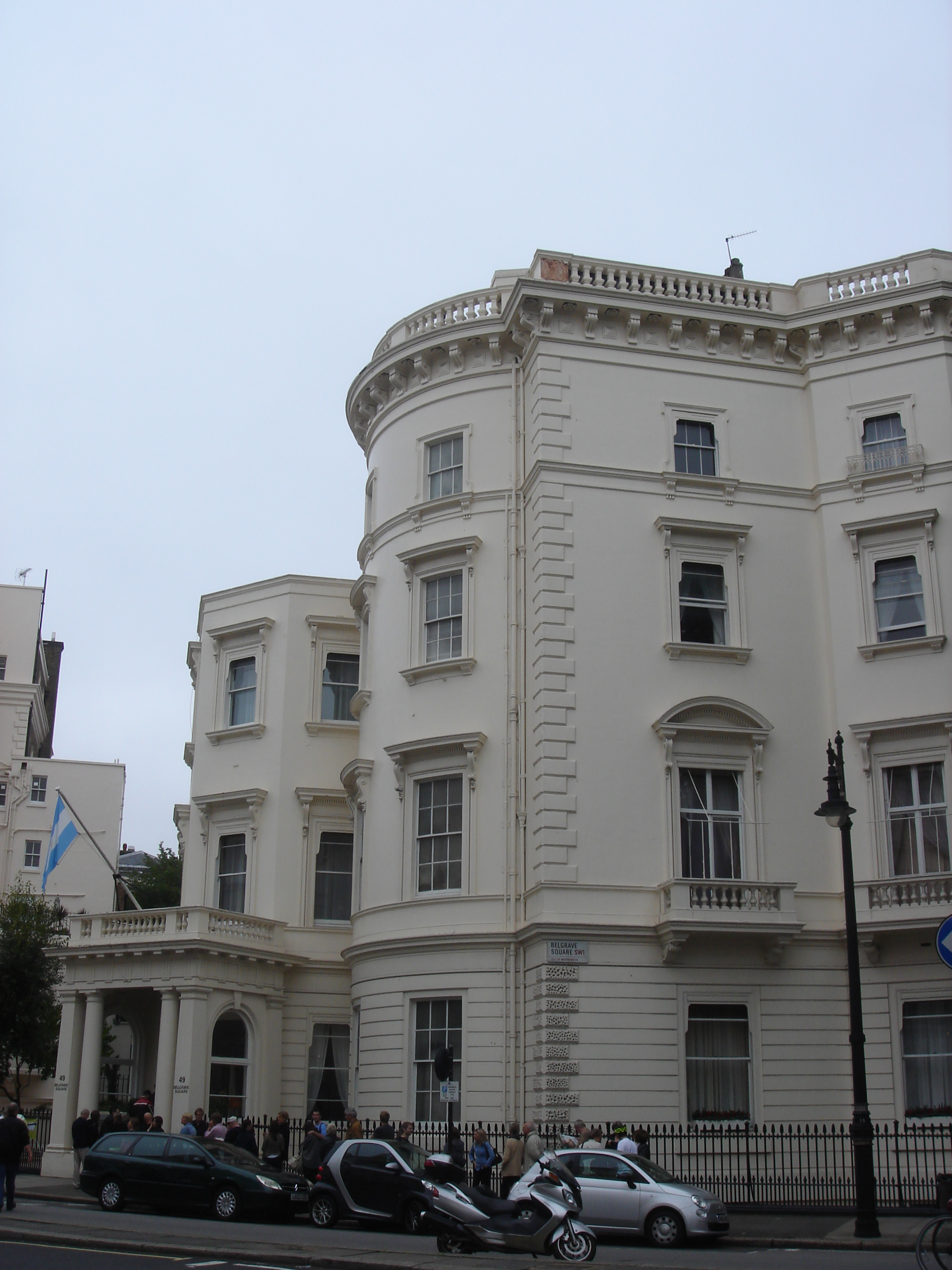
49 Belgrave Square, Beit's London home

Sir Alfred Lane Beit, 2nd Baronet (19 January 1903 – 12 May 1994), was a British Conservative Party politician, art collector and philanthropist and honorary Irish citizen.

== Family background ==
His uncle was Alfred Beit, a South African mining millionaire, after whom he was named when he was born in London on 19 January 1903. His father Otto Beit (1865–1930) was awarded the KCMG in 1920 and was created a baronet in February 1924. His mother was Lilian, daughter of Thomas Lane Carter of New Orleans, US. On Sir Otto's death in 1930, Alfred inherited a large fortune as well as numerous works of art, including works by Goya, Vermeer, Rubens and Gainsborough. Having lived at 49 Belgrave Square, he bought a mansion on Kensington Palace Gardens (the most exclusive address in London), where these paintings were put on display.

Beyond personal wealth, by 1930 the Beit family had philanthropically supported primarily the Imperial College of Science and Technology, the Rhodes Trust and had established the Beit Memorial Fellowship for Medical Research, besides many smaller donations to other groups.

== Political career ==
Known from 1930 as Sir Alfred Beit, he was elected Conservative Member of Parliament (MP) for St Pancras South East at the 1931 general election and re-elected in the 1935 general election. When the Second World War started he joined the Royal Air Force serving in Bomber Command. In 1944 he was appointed PPS to Oliver Stanley, the Colonial Secretary.

Beit lost his seat in the 1945 general election. Disillusioned with British politics and strongly opposed to the new Labour government, he and his wife moved to South Africa. However they were appalled by the apartheid system that developed there after 1948, and soon returned to the UK.

== Family life ==
In April 1939 he married Clementine Mabell Kitty Freeman-Mitford, born on 22 October 1915, who was the posthumous daughter of Major Clement Mitford (d.1915), a granddaughter of the 1st Lord Redesdale and a cousin of the Mitford sisters. Another first cousin Clementine Hozier had married Winston Churchill.

Clementine's widowed mother spent long periods in Africa after marrying Captain Courteney Brocklehust, a game warden. Clementine and her sister were frequently sent to stay with their cousins. She was a contemporary of Unity Mitford at St Margaret's School, Bushey, and also went to Berlin to learn German, where she met Hitler through her cousin. She was occasionally escorted by a handsome young stormtrooper, and was asked by Unity to "waggle a flag" as "the darling Führer" passed in the street. Given the Beits' Jewish origins, this chance encounter with fascism did not last.

The Beits had no children.

== Later life ==
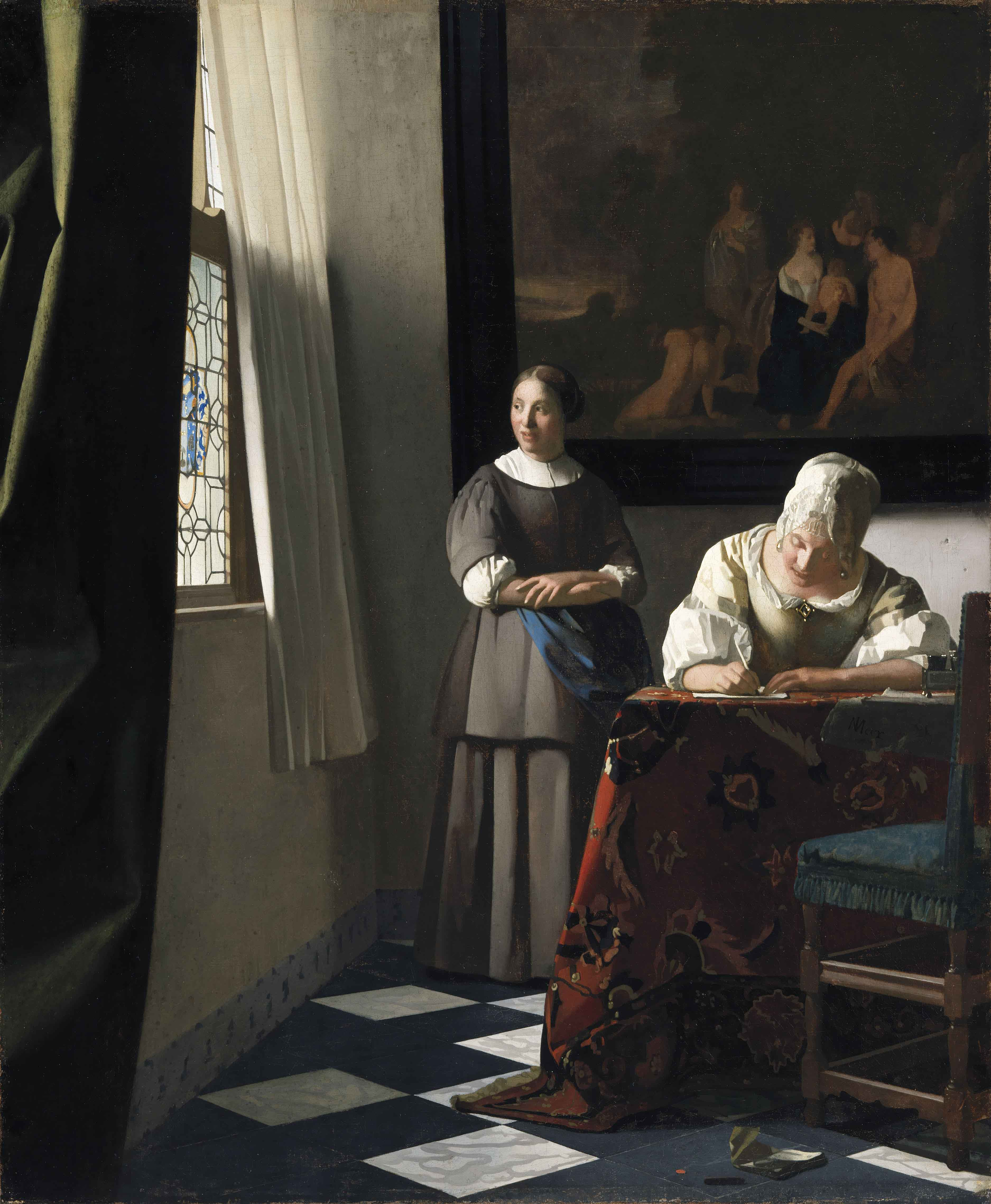
Lady Writing a Letter with her Maid by Vermeer, one of the paintings Beit donated to the National Gallery of Ireland in 1987.

Alfred Beit bought Russborough House in County Wicklow, Ireland, in 1952, following a suggestion by Randal Plunkett, 19th Baron of Dunsany, and moved his art collection there. He had copied a mantelpiece from Russborough in his London home in the 1930s, and was aware of the beauty of the house long before they moved there.

The Beits continued to visit Africa in the 1950s and, having no children of their own, they paid for schools, libraries and health clinics in Zimbabwe, Malawi and Botswana. However, by the late 1970s they were saddened that many of these improvements had not been maintained by the post-colonial governments.

Living quietly in Ireland, their main interests centred on supporting the fine arts and the Wexford Festival Opera.

== Art collection ==
Beit inherited the family art collection which included paintings by Jan Vermeer, Jacob van Ruisdael, Adriaen van Ostade, Gabriel Metsu, Joshua Reynolds and Thomas Gainsborough that his father had acquired. He added to the collection, acquiring, for example, Lajoue’s Cabinet de Physique and Bibliothéque de Bonnier de La Mosson (1734); Indian Blackbuck with Two Pointers (1745) by Jean-Baptiste Oudry, Goya’s Doña Antonia Zárate and Hals’s Lute Player (c.1630) as well as fine furniture, tapestries, porcelain, clocks, and ornaments. He once owned Vermeer's A Young Woman Seated at the Virginals, however he 'doubted its authenticity and sold it'.

== Art thefts ==
=== 1974 robbery ===
In 1974, an IRA gang led by Rose Dugdale broke into Russborough House, making off with nineteen paintings, including a Goya, a Vermeer and a Gainsborough. The stolen paintings were notionally valued at more than IR£8 million. In the process, the Beits were pistol-whipped, tied up and pushed down a flight of stone stairs. The IRA intended to hold the paintings to ransom in exchange for the transfer of Dolours Price and Marian Price, IRA members who had been convicted of car-bombings in England. All the stolen paintings were recovered in County Cork a few weeks later.

=== 1986 robbery ===
In 1986, the house was robbed again, this time by the Dublin criminal Martin Cahill (known in the tabloid media as "The General"). Cahill and his gang stole 18 paintings notionally valued at IR£30 million, all but two of which were recovered in police operations in Britain, Belgium and Turkey.

=== 2001 robbery ===
In 2001, two more paintings (a Bellotto and a Gainsborough) were stolen in another robbery. Both were recovered in 2002.

=== 2002 robbery ===
In 2002, another robbery took five paintings, including two Rubens.

As a result of the thefts, the Irish state had to move the unique collection to Dublin, making Russborough less attractive to tourists.

== Award for unique donation ==
Beit was made an honorary Irish citizen in 1993, in recognition of his philanthropy, including a 1987 donation of seventeen masterpieces to the National Gallery of Ireland. The paintings donated had an estimated value of between IR£50 million and IR£100 million. The gallery described the donation as "among the greatest single gift to any Gallery in the world in that generation". The Beit Wing of the National Gallery on Merrion Square is named in honour of the Beits, who also served on the board of directors of the gallery.

When his wife Clementine died in 2005, her will stated that Alfred Beit's diaries should be kept secret until 21 years after Queen Elizabeth II's death or 70 years after Lady Beit's own death, a clause which sparked speculation in the media that her diaries might refer to the private life of The Queen. However, it is also typical of such a family to refer in their wills and trusts to a future unknown date that would become well-known, for example the date of death of a public personage. She and Sir Alfred are both buried at St Mary's Church, Blessington, County Wicklow.

== Alfred Beit Foundation ==
The Beits' cultural work is carried on by the Alfred Beit Foundation, founded in 1976 and based at Russborough. In December 2006 the Foundation sold a collection of Italian medieval bronzes for £2,000,000 at Christie's in London to support ongoing repairs at Russborough.

Parliament of the United Kingdom
Preceded by Herbert Romeril	Member of Parliament for St Pancras South East; 1931–1945	Succeeded by Santo Jeger
Baronetage of the United Kingdom
Preceded by Sir Otto Beit	Baronet of Tewin Water; 1930–1994	Extinct
