= Minerals Council South Africa =

South African mining-industry employer organisation

- Predecessor: Transvaal and Orange Free State Chamber of Mines
- Formation: 1968
- Founded at: Johannesburg, South Africa
- Purpose: A mining industry employers’ organisation that supports and promotes the South African mining industry, serving and promoting their interests by providing strategic support and advisory input.
- Location: 5 Hollard Street, Johannesburg
- Region served: Gauteng, South Africa
- Members: 69 corporate members
- President: Paul Dunne
- Vice President: Mpumi Zikalala
- Vice President: Richard Stewart
- Website: www.mineralscouncil.org.za

The Minerals Council South Africa is a South African mining-industry employer organisation. Its members include famous South African mining houses such as Anglo American, De Beers, Gold Fields, and Harmony. In its current form, it was founded in 1968 as the Chamber of Mines, a South Africa-wide organisation. Prior to that year, it has its early origins as the Transvaal Chamber of Mines in 1887, then evolved over many years reforming as the Witwatersrand Chamber of Mines in 1889, the Chamber of Mines of the South African Republic from 1897, Transvaal Chamber of Mines from 1902, and lastly from 1953 until 1967 as the Transvaal and Orange Free State Chamber of Mines. On 23 May 2018, the South African Chamber of Mines rebranded itself as the Minerals Council South Africa.

== Early history ==
On 21 October 1887, the Transvaal Chamber of Mines met for the first time at Central Hotel in Johannesburg. Forty seven people attended the first meeting and its first President was Henry Struben. The organization's main aim was to disseminate information, the reading of technical and scientific papers, publishing monthly gold returns, financial issues and other mining issues but after a few meetings the group petered out. More than a year later in 1889, the Chamber was reconstituted as the Witwatersrand Chamber of Mines. Its new president was Hermann Eckstein and the honorary President was Paul Kruger.

The early work of the Chamber was a uniform standard of treatment for black mine workers on the members mines, advocated for changes to the Gold Law legislation and for a railway system with the South African Republic government. By 1892, Eckstein took up post in London and Lionel Phillips took over as President of the Chamber on 1 January 1893.

== Previous presidents ==
- 1889-92 Hermann Eckstein
- 1892-96 Lionel Phillips
- 1896-98 James Hay
- 1898-1902 Georges Rouliot
- 1902-03 Sir Percy Fitzpatrick
- 1903-04 Sir George Farrar
- 1904-05 H.F Strange
- 1905-06 F.D.P Chaplin
- 1906-07 J.N de Jongh
- 1907-08 Louis Julius Reyersbach
- 1908-09 Lionel Phillips
- 1909-10 J.W.S Langerman
- 1910-11 John Gardiner Hamilton
