= Saxonwold =

- Location within Gauteng Location within South Africa
- Coordinates: 26°9′23″S 28°2′26″E
- Country: South Africa
- Province: Gauteng
- Municipality: City of Johannesburg
- Main Place: Johannesburg
- Established: 1925

Area
  - Total: 2.58 km^{2} (1.00 sq mi)

Population (2011)
  - Total: 2,557
  - Density: 991/km^{2} (2,570/sq mi)

Racial makeup (2011)
  - Black African: 27.4%
  - Coloured: 2.8%
  - Indian/Asian: 9.5%
  - White: 58.2%
  - Other: 2.1%

First languages (2011)
  - English: 67.9%
  - Afrikaans: 11.0%
  - Zulu: 4.7%
  - Tswana: 3.5%
  - Other: 12.9%
- Time zone: UTC+2 (SAST)
- Postal code (street): 2196
- PO box: 2132

Saxonwold is an affluent suburb of Johannesburg, South Africa. It is situated in what was once the Sachsenwald Forest in the early 20th century. It is located in Region E of the City of Johannesburg Metropolitan Municipality.

== History ==
The suburb has its origins as part of the Braamfontein farm which was owned by Hermann Eckstein. He had bought the farm to explore it for minerals and when he failed to find any, the land was converted as a timber plantation in 1891 called Sachsenwald after Otto von Bismarck's estate. The land's name was anglicized at the beginning of World War One and was called Saxonwold. In 1903, Wernher Beit & Co and Max Michaelis gave 200 acres of freehold ground in the Sachsenwald plantation to the Johannesburg Town Council for the use by the people of Johannesburg by the creation of the Herman Eckstein Park. This park would become Zoo Lake, the Johannesburg Zoo and the South African National Museum of Military History. The remaining land in the plantation was developed into a township called Saxonwold in 1925 by the Transvaal Consolidated Land & Exploration Co Ltd. The streets were laid out to view the Rand Regiments Memorial with instructions to home builders not to impede the view of the memorial and the street names having an old Anglo-Saxon theme and ended in wold.

The Japanese School of Johannesburg previously had a location in Saxonwold. After a negative campaign in 1968, the location was forced to close.

The Villa d'Este was built in 1923. The South African National Museum of Military History and the Anglo-Boer War Memorial are also located in Saxonwold.

The Nelson Mandela Children's Fund is also located in Saxonwold.

It has traditionally been a centre for Johannesburg's Jewish community. Jewish residents made up 47% of the population in 1971.

During the apartheid era, it was classed as a "whites only" area under the terms of the Group Areas Act. Since the repeal of the Act in 1991, the resident-mix has become more cosmopolitan, albeit with white residents remaining the largest population group.

== Notable people ==
- The Gupta family.
