= Beyers Naudé Square =

City square in Johannesburg, South Africa

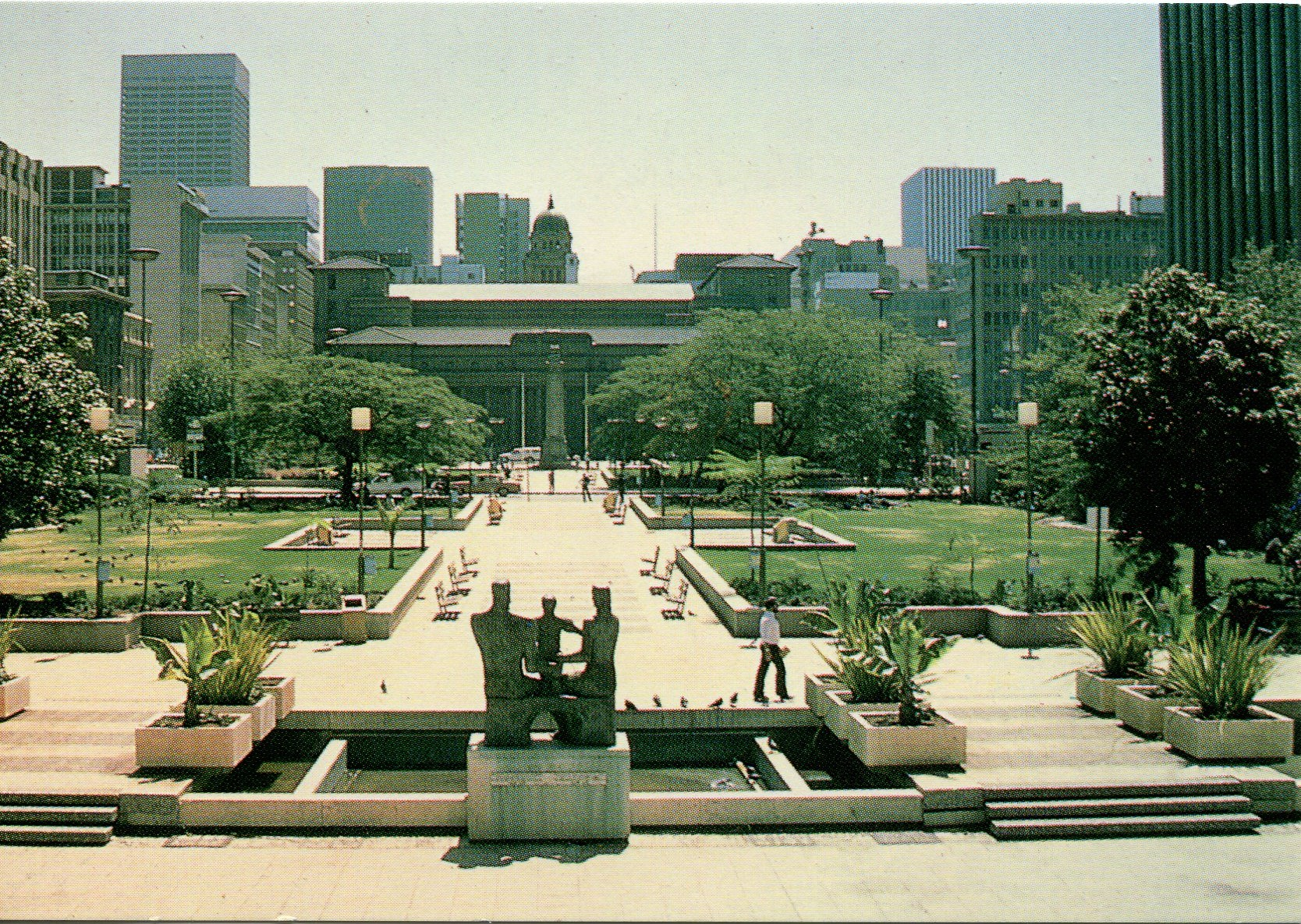
- Beyers Naude Square in 1988
- Interactive map of the Beyers Naudé Square area
- Former names: Market square

General information
- Location: Johannesburg, South Africa
- Coordinates: 26°12′16.37471″S 28°2′20.94763″E

The Beyers Naudé Square is a large city square in the center of Johannesburg, South Africa, named after Beyers Naudé, a former dominee in the Dutch Reformed Church, who was banned by the apartheid government for campaigning against apartheid. The square was originally called Market Square because it was Johannesburg's first market place after it came into existence.

== History ==
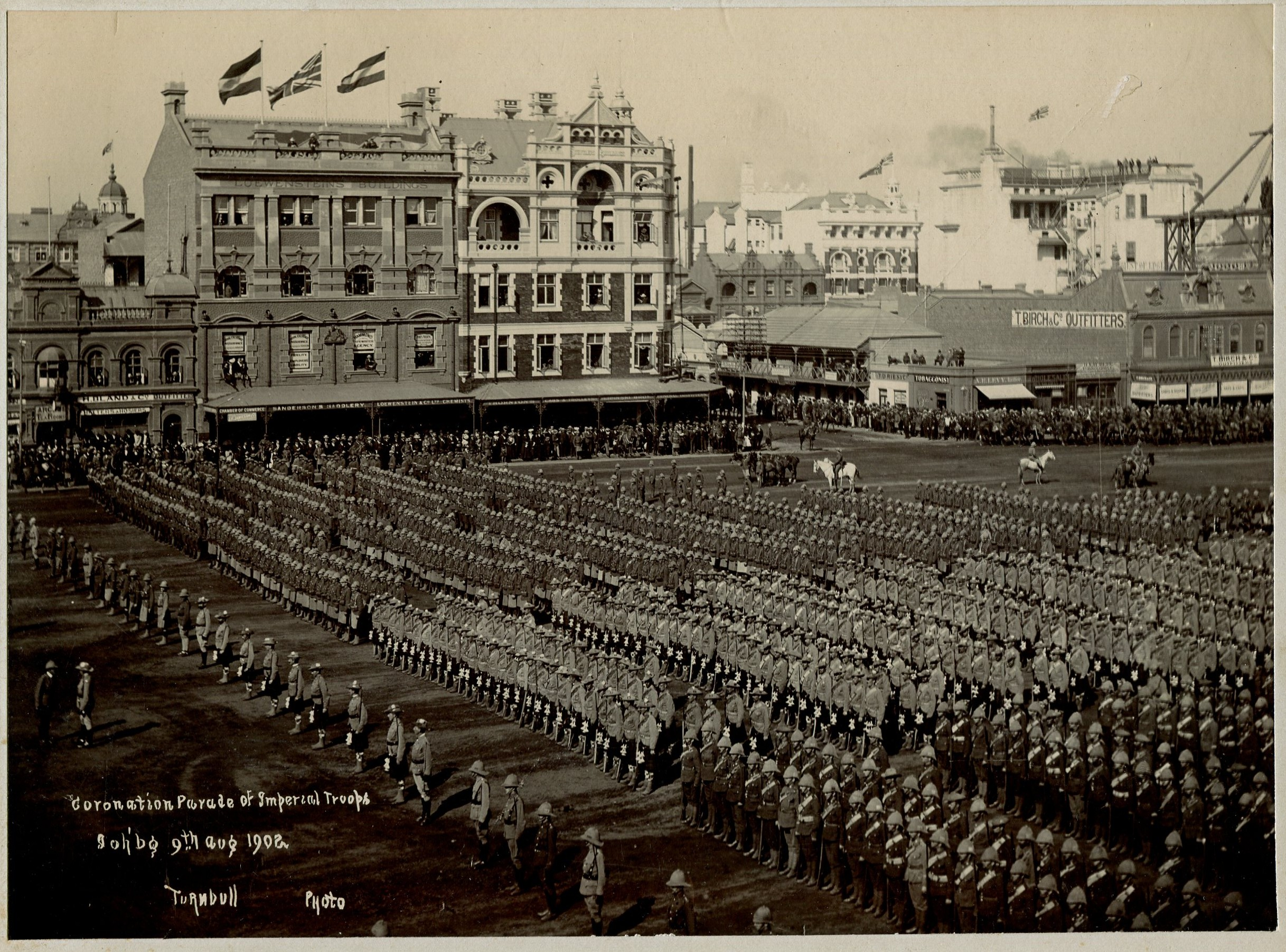
Coronation Parade of Imperial troops in 1902 in "Market Square"

Market square was formed soon after the gold rush in Johannesburg and later in 1913 the market was moved to Newtown when the new building, now Museum Africa and the Market Theatre, was built. Over the years the Square was given several names including Market Square Gardens, City Hall Gardens, Library Gardens, and Harry Hofmeyr Gardens.

== Monuments ==
- The Cenotaph
