= Johannesburg Zoo =

Zoo in South Africa

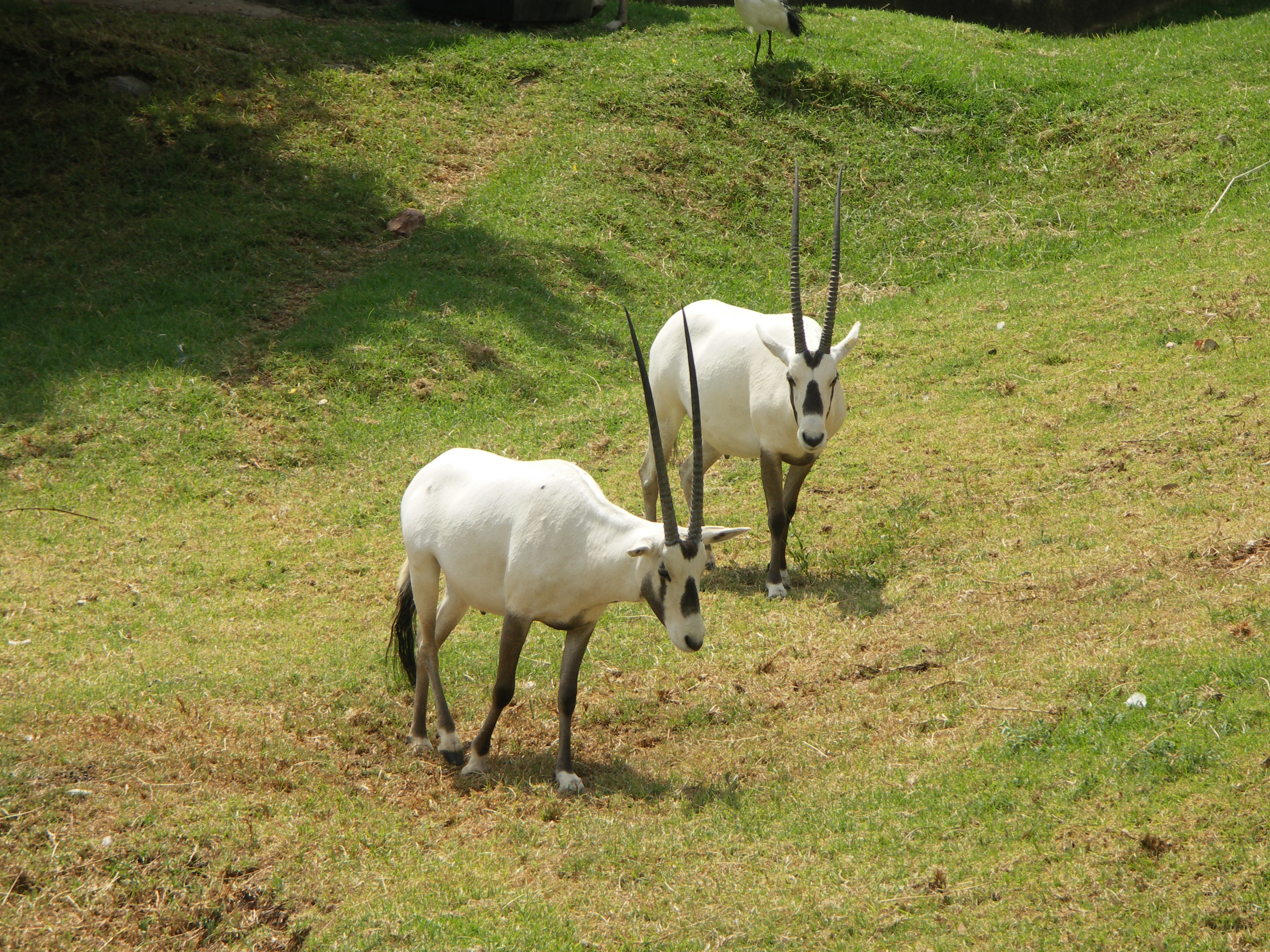
- White oryx at the Johannesburg Zoo
- Interactive map of Johannesburg Zoo
- 26°09′59″S 28°02′17″E
- Date opened: 22 March 1904; 122 years ago
- Location: Johannesburg, South Africa
- Land area: 81 ha (200 acres)
- No. of animals: 2,000
- No. of species: 320
- Annual visitors: 515,623 (2019)
- Memberships: WAZA
- Website: Joburg Zoo

The Johannesburg Zoo or Joburg Zoo is a 55-hectare (140-acre) zoo in Johannesburg, South Africa. The zoo is dedicated to the accommodation, enrichment, husbandry, and medical care of wild animals, and houses about 2000 individuals of 320 species. Established in 1904, it has traditionally been owned and operated by the Johannesburg City Council. However, it has been turned into a corporation and registered as a Section 21 non-profit organisation.

== History ==
The Johannesburg Zoo has its origins as part of the Braamfontein farm which was owned by Hermann Eckstein. He had bought the farm to explore it for minerals and when he failed to find any, the land was converted as a timber plantation in 1891 called Sachsenwald after Otto von Bismarck. In August 1903, the Mayor of Johannesburg, W. St. John Carr, received a letter from Wernher Beit & Co and Max Michaelis with an offer of 200 acres of freehold ground in the Sachsenwald plantation to the Johannesburg Town Council for recreational use by the people of Johannesburg with the park being named the Herman Eckstein Park to honour the man of the same name. This park would become Zoo Lake, the Johannesburg Zoo and the South African National Museum of Military History. The land was transferred to the Johannesburg Town Council on 22 March 1904.

Sir Percy Fitzpatrick would donate the first animals to the zoo, his own small private collection of African wildlife and would continue to source animals for the zoo until 1912. The zoo's first enclosures housed two lions and a leopard. In 1910 a bandstand was constructed for bass band music. After 1912 the zoo expanded into land that had been allocated in trust for a war memorial, the Rand Regiments Memorial for soldiers that died during the Second Anglo-Boer War. Between 1913 and 1915, a rhino and elephant house were built and an Asian elephant and a camel were imported and trained for rides. Due to requirements in the Deed of Gift under which the land for the Johannesburg Zoo and the neighbouring Zoo Lake was acquired, the zoo, and neighbouring park, are one of very few public areas that were never segregated during Apartheid in South Africa. In the 1960s the zoo would evolve from iron and concrete cages into open and landscaped enclosures. From 1994 onwards, the zoo like others in South Africa begun to lose their government grants and so in 2000, the Johannesburg City Council corporatised the zoo and it became the Johannesburg Zoo Company with the council as its main shareholder and by 2007 was expected to generate 75% of its own budget. The zoo has currently 326 species consisting of 2096 specimens housed consisting of 20 species of frogs, 5 of spiders, 128 of birds, 47 of reptiles, 25 of fish and 101 of mammals.

It was home to Africa's last polar bear until 2014.

== Breeding programme ==
It is one of the few places in the world with white lions (a genetic mutation of African lions), and has had considerable success in their breeding; these are more sought after than tawny lions by other zoos. The Johannesburg Zoo is also the only zoo in South Africa to have successfully bred Siberian tigers, the largest cats in the world. "Twist" the male Siberian, weighs 320 kg, and is the father of all the Siberian tigers to be found in South Africa. Max the gorilla was probably the zoo's best known resident.

== Visitor information ==
The zoo is open all year including public holidays from 8:30 to 17:30. Tours and excursions around the zoo are offered under the auspices of the zoo's education department. Other activities offered include night tours and overnight sleepovers. In August 2017, a new R 45 million parkade replaced the old 200 vehicle carpark with one holding 700 cars and 15 buses.

== See also ==
- National Zoological Gardens of South Africa
