= Beit baronets =

Extinct baronetcy in the Baronetage of the United Kingdom

The Beit Baronetcy, of Tewin Water, in the parish of Tewin, in the County of Hertford, was created in the Baronetage of the United Kingdom on 24 October 1924 for the financier, philanthropist and art connoisseur Sir Otto Beit, KCMG. With the death of his son, the second Baronet, a member of parliament for St Pancras South East the baronetcy became extinct.

== Beit baronets, of Tewin Water (1924) ==
- Sir Otto John Beit, 1st Baronet (1865–1930)
- Sir Alfred Lane Beit, 2nd Baronet (1903–1994)
