= Jules Porgès =

Austrian-born French diamond and art dealer

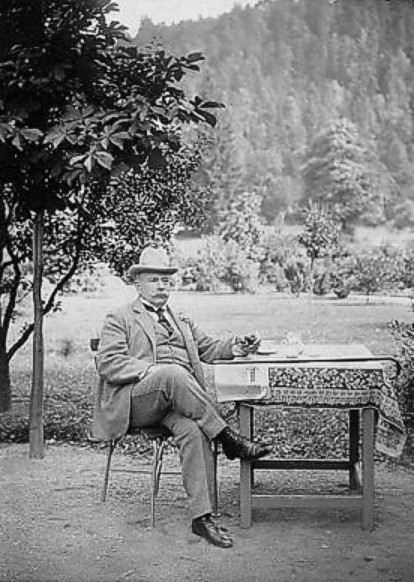
- Jules Porgès in Prague 1875
- Born: Yehuda Porges; 25 May 1839; Vienna, Austrian Empire
- Died: 20 September 1921 (aged 82); Paris, France
- Occupations: Financier, diamond and art dealer

Jules Porgès (25 May 1839 – 20 September 1921) was a Paris-based financier who played a central role in the rise of the Randlords who controlled the diamond and gold mining industries in South Africa.

He was born Yehuda Porges in Vienna to a Jewish family and raised in Prague, where his father was a jeweller. He settled in Paris in the early 1860s and established himself as a diamond trader, through his company Jules Porgès & Cie.

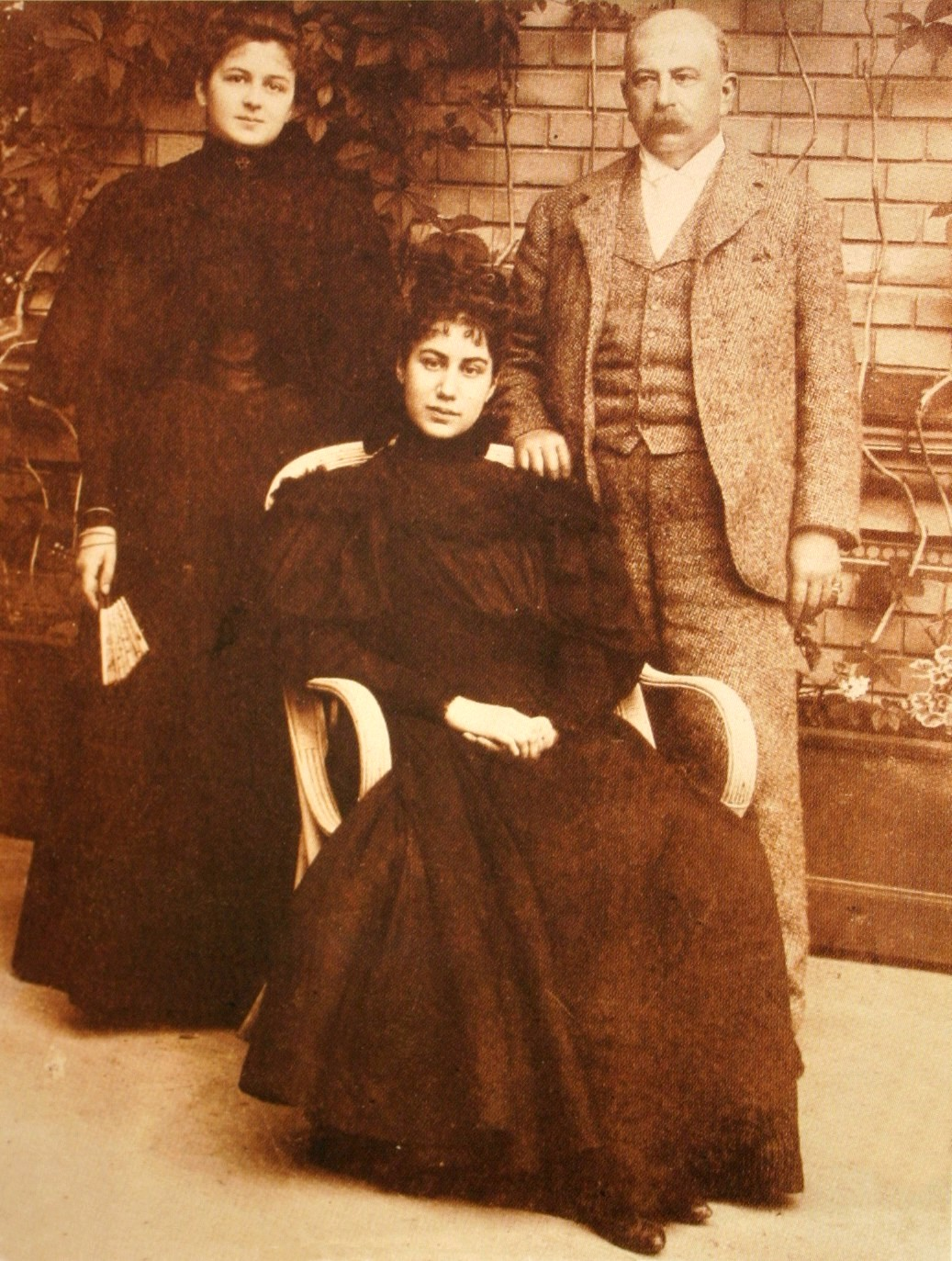
Jules Porgès with wife Anna and daughter

He recognized early the significance of the diamond finds in South Africa and, in 1873, sent two of his younger staff, Alfred Beit and Julius Wernher, to South Africa as his firm's representatives. He arrived in Kimberley himself in 1876 and continued their work in consolidating claims, financing deals and marketing stones, so that his firm Compagnie Française de Diamant du Cap de Bonne Espérance gained a significant portion of the Kimberley mine.

He saw the benefit of Cecil Rhodes's attempt to consolidate the disparate mining holdings, and sold the Compagnie Française to De Beers Consolidated Mines in 1887. He was also instrumental in the negotiations that led to Rhodes buying the Kimberley Central Mining Company (the stake of Barney Barnato).

With the discovery of gold in South Africa, at Barberton and then Witwatersrand he turned his attention to gold mining and acquired stakes in many mining claims in and around Johannesburg and developed the financial structures that enabled their exploitation. With Beit and Wernher, and other partners including Hermann Eckstein and Eduard Lippert he was the founder of the mining and financial group known as the "Corner House" whose offices were on a corner at the site of Market Square in Johannesburg and whose name was also a pun on "Eckstein", "cornerstone" in German.

In 1890, he largely retired from South African business, and his interests were taken over by the firm of Wernher, Beit & Co.

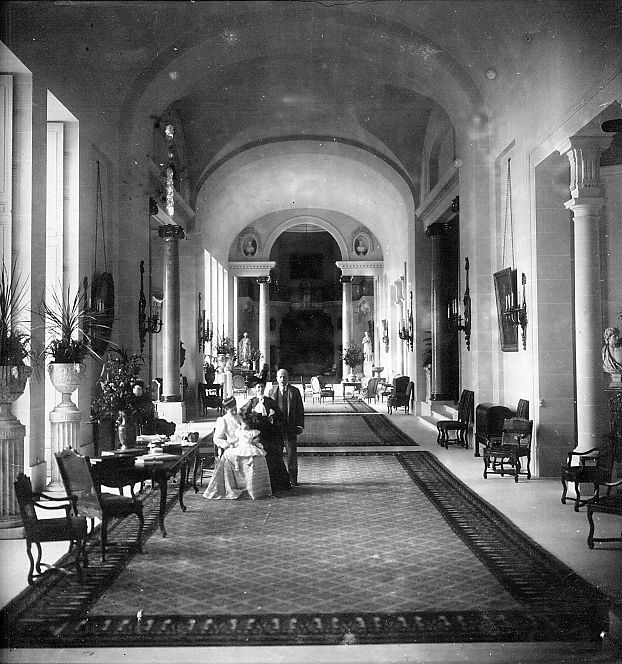
Jules Porgès and family at Chateau de Rochefort 1875

He built a large château at Rochefort-en-Yvelines just outside Paris for his wife known as the Château Porgès de Rochefort-en-Yvelines, and daughter and maintained a 1892 built Paris townhouse on the Avenue Montaigne (14-18 avenue Montaigne), where he housed his important art collection.

He died in Paris in 1921, having outlived many of his protégé Randlords.

== Sources ==
- Dictionary of South African Bibliography. Pretoria. 1983.
