= Anglo-Boer War Memorial (Johannesburg) =

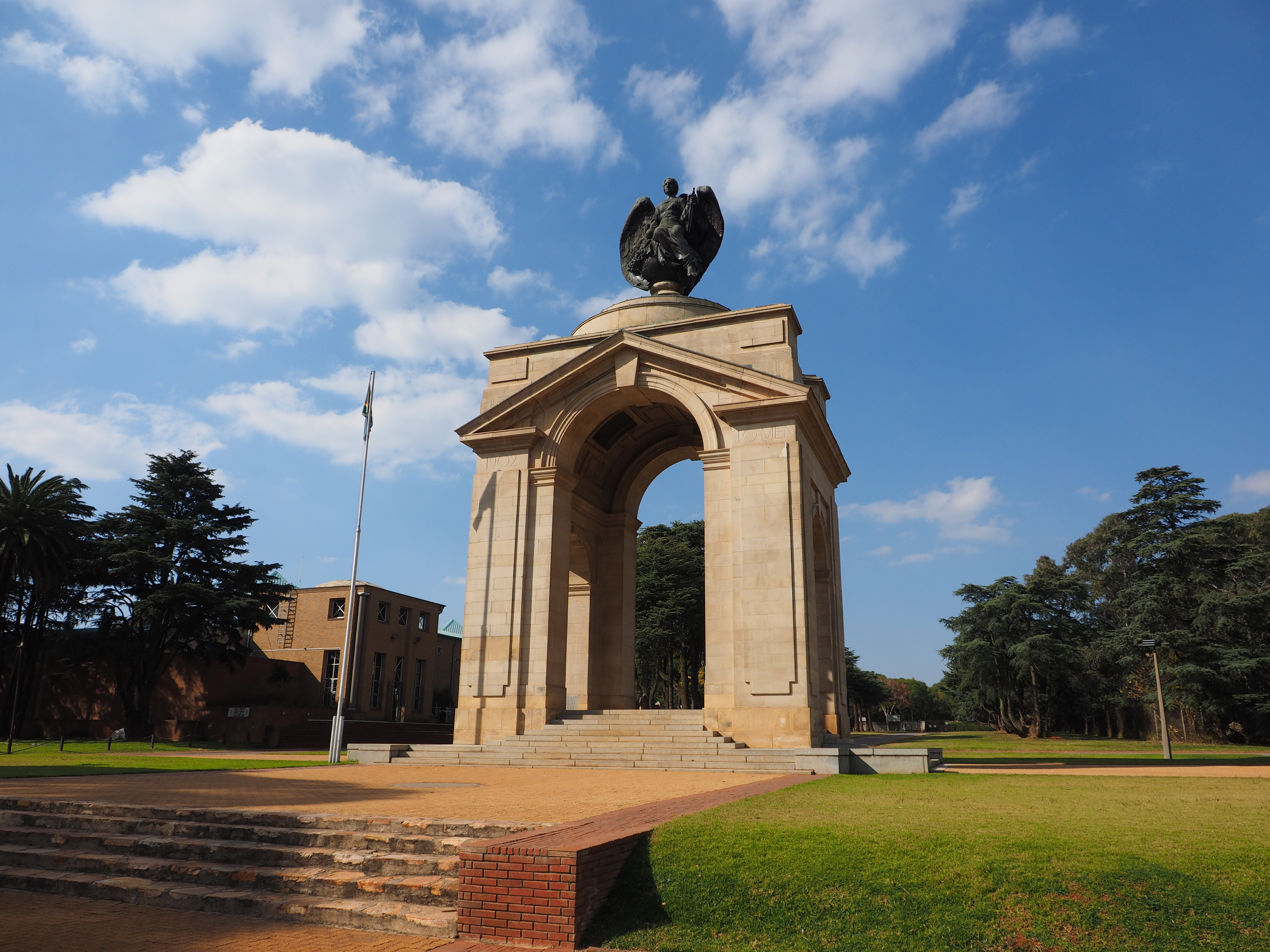
- The Anglo-Boer War Memorial
- Interactive map of the Anglo-Boer War Memorial area
- Former names: Rand Regiments Memorial

General information
- Status: Extant
- Type: Memorial
- Location: Eckstein Park, Saxonwold, Johannesburg, South Africa
- Coordinates: 26.164°S 28.041°E
- Groundbreaking: 30 November 1910
- Completed: 1914
- Owner: City of Johannesburg

Design and construction
- Architect: Edwin Landseer Lutyens
- Architecture firm: Baker & Fleming

The Anglo-Boer War Memorial was originally called the Rand Regiments Memorial and dedicated to the men of the Witwatersrand who joined as British soldiers in the Rand Regiments and who had lost their lives during the Second Boer War (1899–1902). The memorial is now next door to the South African National Museum of Military History. It was rededicated on 10 October 1999 to all people who died during the Second Boer War and renamed the Anglo-Boer War Memorial.

== Construction ==
Soon after the Second Boer War ended in 1902, Randlord Sir Lionel Phillips and others proposed in 1904, a memorial to commemorate the British soldiers that had died in the war. A Rand Regiments' Memorial Committee was formed to raise money for the memorial. In September 1904, Captain George A. Hamilton-Dickson proposed a motion that a site be found for a memorial and that the Town Council start a scheme to build it. The Johannesburg Town Council thought that the memorial should be dedicated to all those that had died in the war but Phillips and the committee would disagree and continued with the project. Sir Lionel Phillips and his company, H. Eckstein and Co, purchased 40 acres (16 ha) in the Sachsenwald Plantation (Saxonwold) as land for the memorial.

On 30 November 1910, Field Marshall the Duke of Connaught and Lord Methuen reviewed a group of volunteers at Milner Park before being accompanied by a detachment from the Imperial Light Horse to the Sachsenwald Plantation (Saxonwold). There in front of a solemn gathering, the duke laid the corner-stone to the future memorial. The site had only been approved a month before the Duke's visit by the town council and no architect or design had been finalised.

The memorial was designed in 1911 by architect Sir Edwin Lutyens, before he became famous for his war memorials after the end of the First World War. The design for the memorial was a 20-metre-tall (66 ft) stone four-arched structure which was completed in 1913. The design of the memorial is said to have been based on the Arc de Triomphe in Paris as well as other Roman triumphal arches. The town council laid out five vistas that would lead up to the memorial and fenced off the 40 acres. On the columns are the names of members of the raised Rand regiments who lost their lives in the war and is made up of members of the Bethune's Mounted Infantry, Commander in Chief's Bodyguard, Johannesburg Mounted Rifles, Thorneycroft's Mounted Infantry, South African Light Horse, Imperial Light Horse, Railway Pioneer Regiment, Imperial Light Infantry and Rand Rifles.

Sir Lionel Philips would pay for, from his personal funds, a bronze sculpture that would adorn the top of the memorial as a gift to the people of Johannesburg. The bronze sculpture was commissioned by Sir Hugh Lane, who had hoped to have it designed by Auguste Rodin, but settled on Naoum Aronson. Designed in Paris, the bronze sculpture, when finally mounted atop the memorial in April 1914, would face to the west. As to what the sculpture represents, the sources differ, with some calling it Nike (the Greek winged goddess of victory) while others – in the interest of reconciliation between the English and Afrikaaner populations – referred to it as an "angel of peace". The Lutyens Trust says the initial design was for a triumphal angel, but the final design was one of an angel of peace. The memorial would be known as the Kakiemonument ('khaki monument') by the Afrikaaner population who had fought against the British during the war.

== Role as a memorial ==
During the Apartheid period the government banned military parades at the memorial due to it being dedicated to British soldiers who were killed in the Second Boer War.

The memorial was rededicated on 10 October 1999 in "memory of the men, women and children of all races and all nations who lost their lives in the Anglo Boer War, 1899–1902". 1 June 2002 saw a gathering at the memorial to commemorate the hundred-year anniversary of the end of the Second Boer War, on 31 May 1902. A total of 22 000 British soldiers, 7 000 Boers, 24 000 black men, women and children, and 22 000 white women and children who had died during the war or in concentration camps, were remembered at the ceremony.

In 2015, the City of Johannesburg budgeted R1,000,000 to restore the memorial which included cleaning the sculpture and adding a protective coating. Other work carried out to restore the memorial was the introduction of storm drainage, as the stone blocks had moved out of alignment due to years of excessive moisture in the ground.

Ceremonies marking Remembrance Sunday have been held at the Anglo-Boer War Memorial since 2023. These events previously took place at the The Cenotaph in Johannesburg CBD. The 2023 ceremony was organised by the Memorable Order of Tin Hats, a veterans' organisation, after the City of Johannesburg stated that it did not have a budget for the Cenotaph. The City of Johannesburg jointly hosted a Remembrance Sunday service with a veterans' organisation at the Anglo-Boer War Memorial in 2025.
