= South African National Museum of Military History =

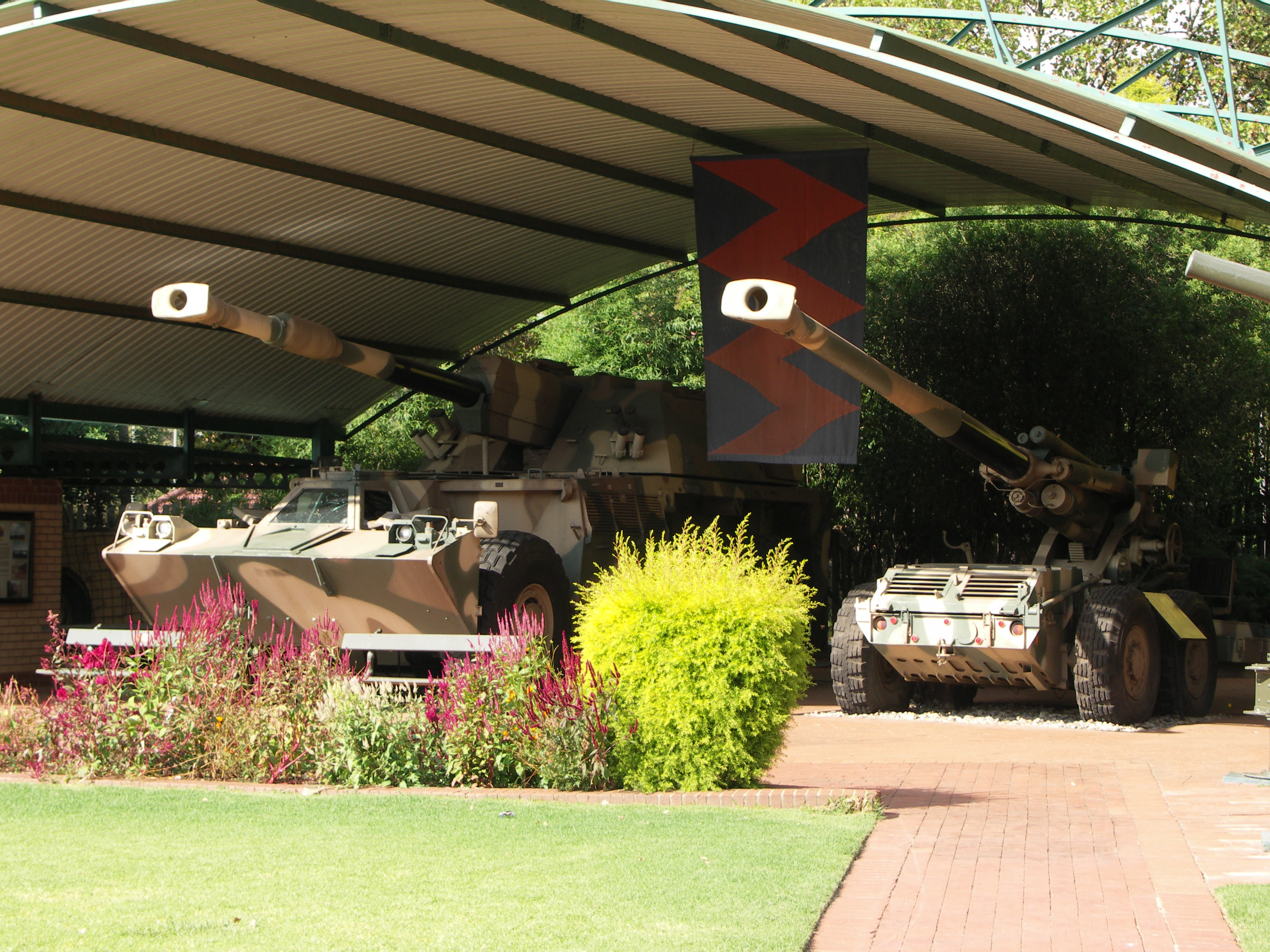
- Established: August 29, 1947; 79 years ago
- Location: Johannesburg, South Africa
- Coordinates: 26.1633°S 28.0420°E
- Type: Military museum
- Website: The Ditsong National Museum of Military History

Ditsong Museums of South Africa network
- Natural History; Military History; Cultural History; Agricultural History; Pionier Museum; Sammy Marks Museum; Tswaing Meteorite Crater; Kruger Museum

The South African National Museum of Military History in Johannesburg was officially opened by Prime Minister Jan Smuts on 29 August 1947 to preserve the history of South Africa's involvement in the Second World War. In 1975, the museum was renamed from the South African National War Museum and its function changed to include all conflicts that South Africa has been involved in. In 1999 it was amalgamated with the Pretoria-based Transvaal Museum and National Cultural History Museum to form the Northern Flagship Institution. In April 2010 Ditsong was officially renamed Ditsong Museums of South Africa and the SANMMH was renamed the Ditsong National Museum of Military History.

== The Anglo-Boer War Memorial ==
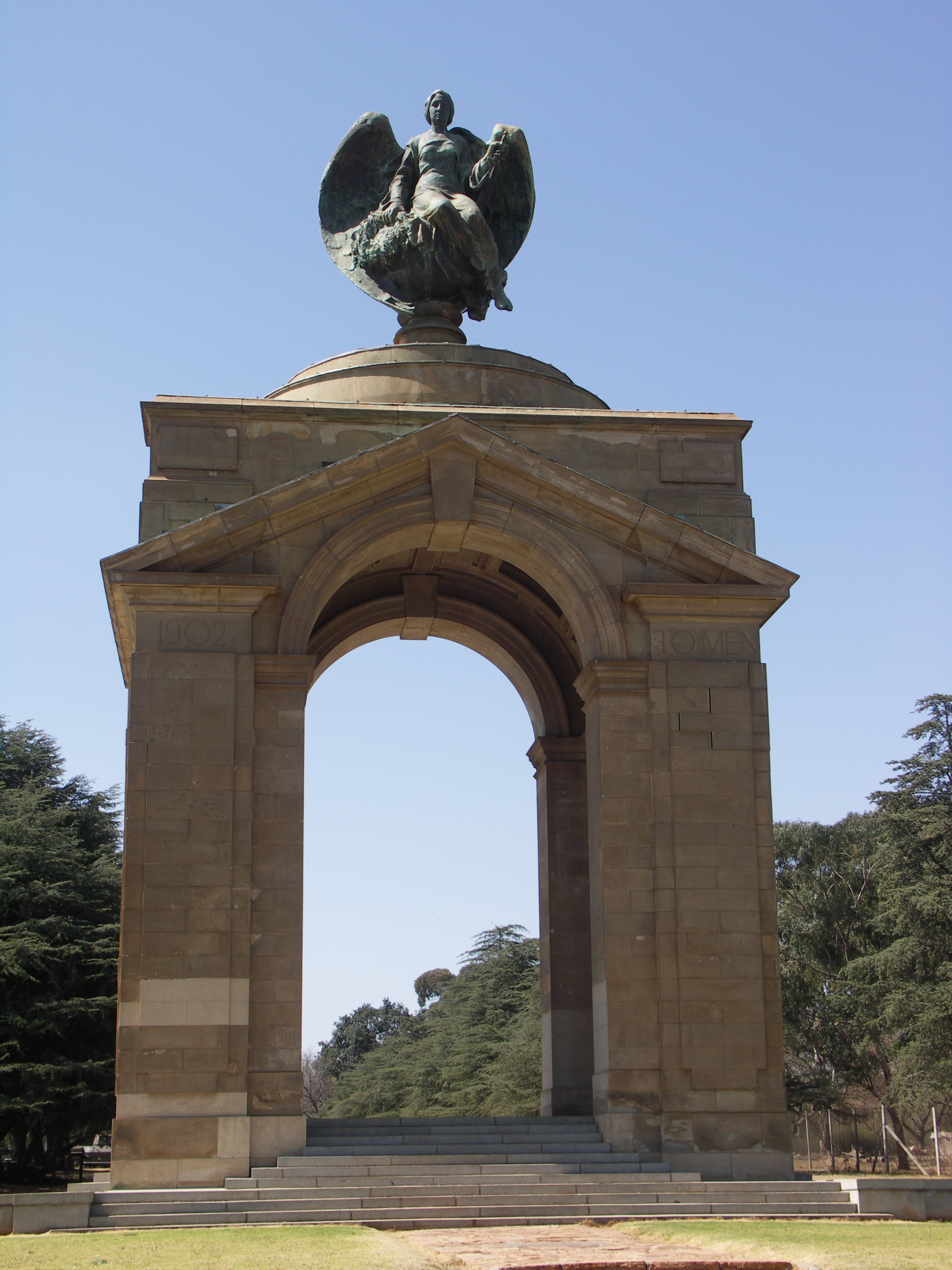
The Anglo-Boer War Memorial

In the grounds of the museum is a large memorial designed by Sir Edwin Lutyens.

On 30 November 1910 Prince Arthur, Duke of Connaught and Strathearn laid a commemorative stone at the memorial.

Originally called the Rand Regiments Memorial and dedicated to British soldiers that lost their lives during the Second Boer War, it was rededicated on 10 October 1999 to all people who died during the Second Boer War and renamed the Boer War Memorial.

== Exhibits ==
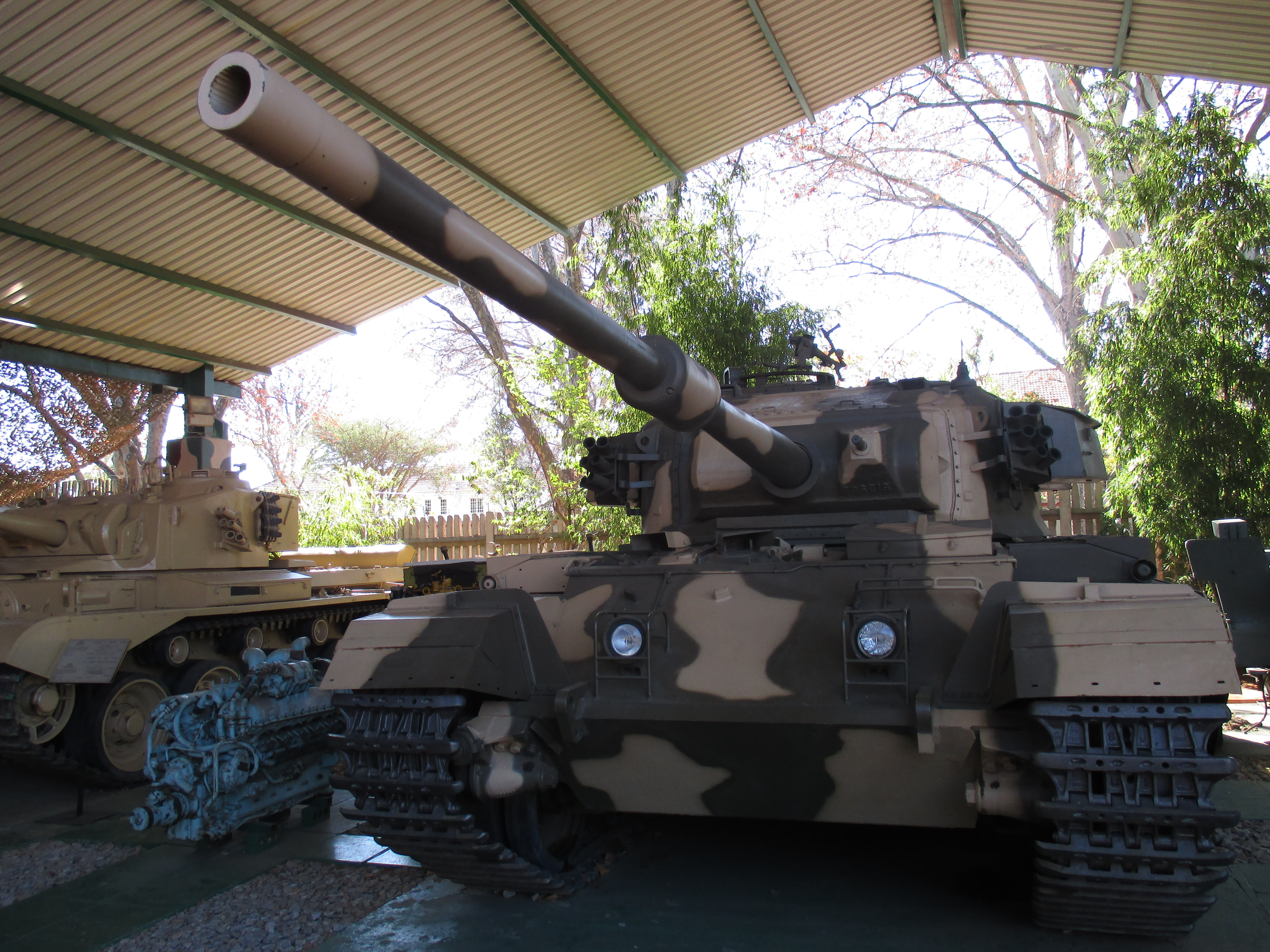
A modified South African Centurion Tank

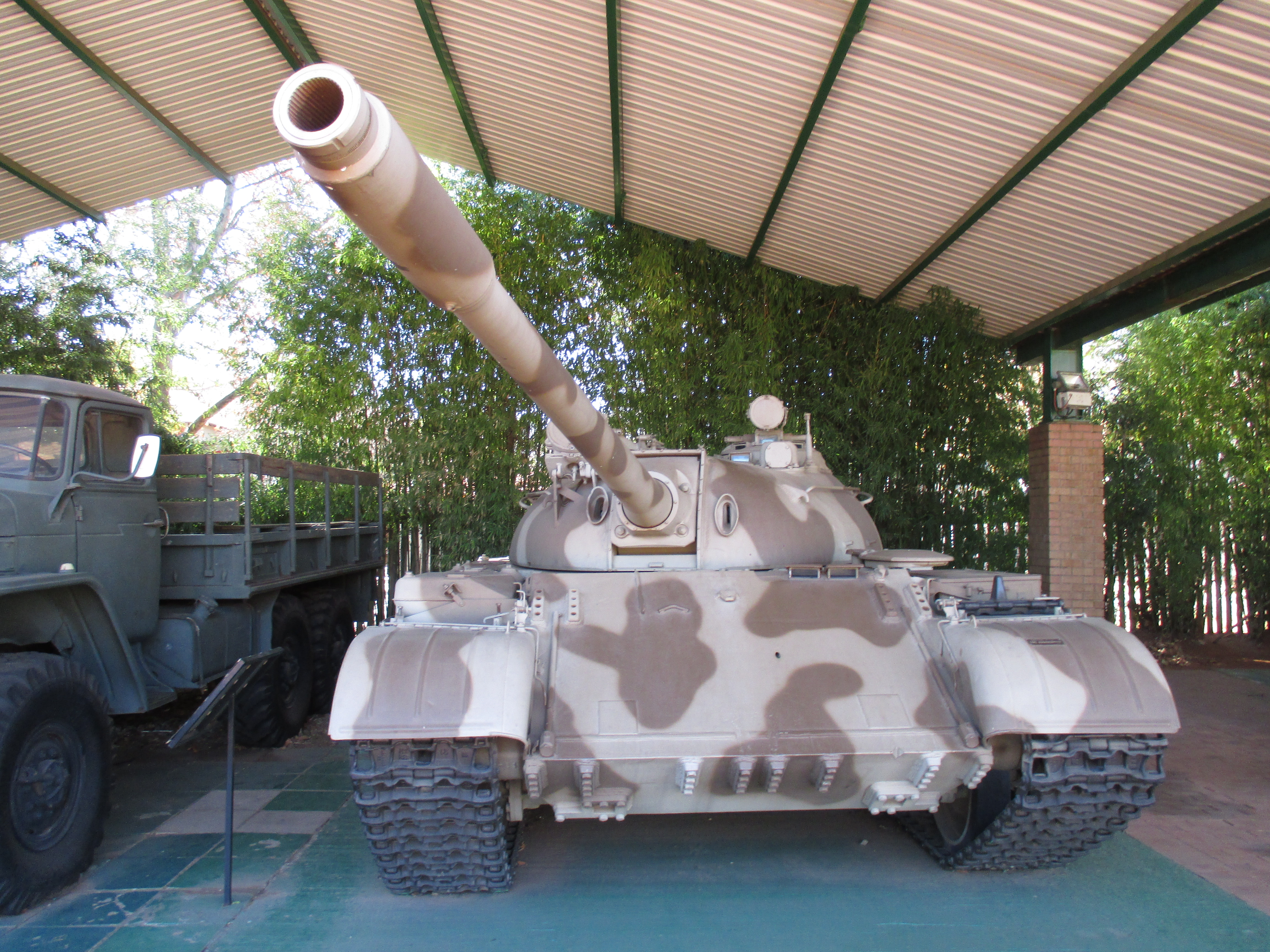
A captured Cold War era T-54/55 tank

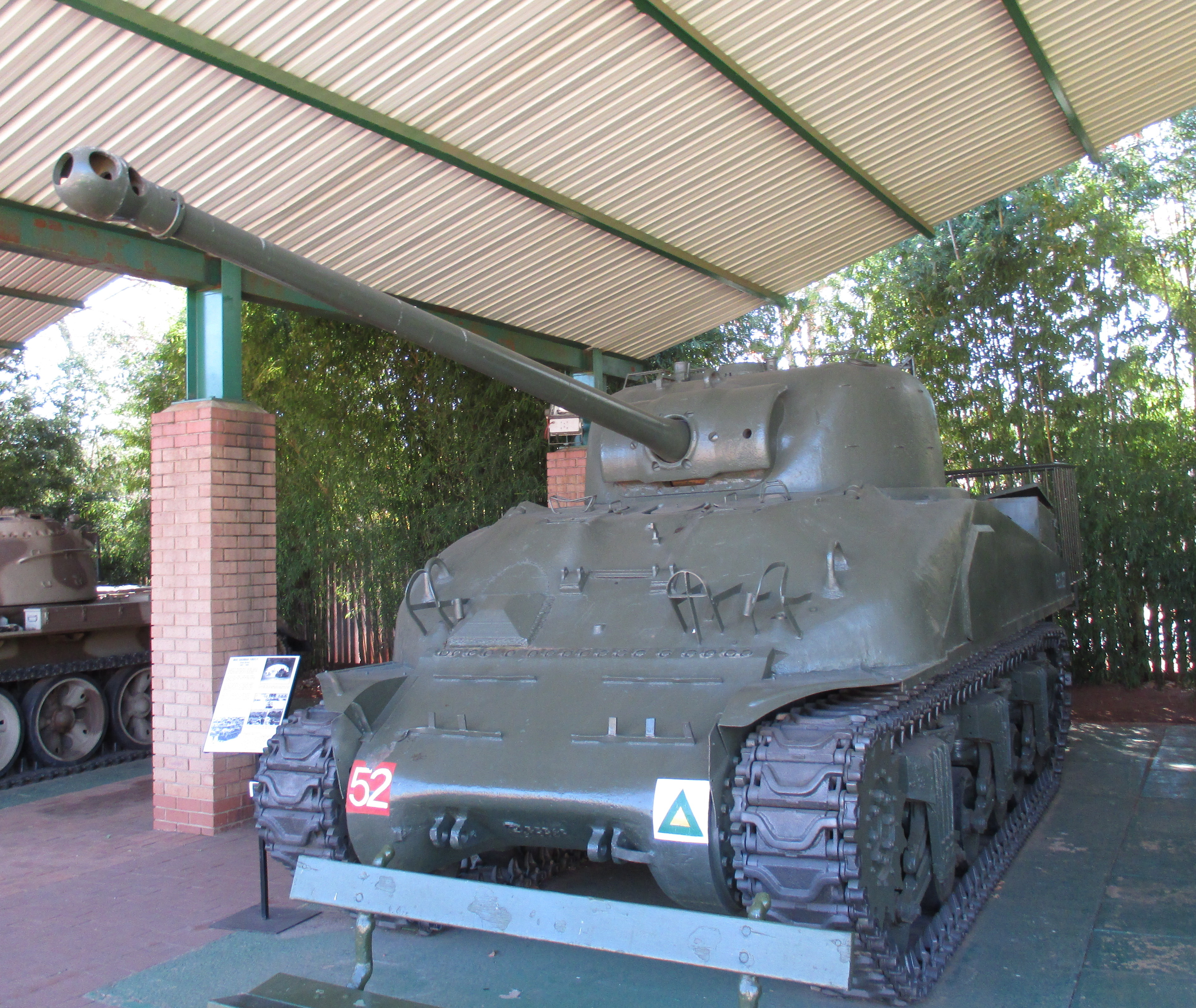
A retired Sherman Firefly of the 6th South African Armoured Division

The museum is divided into a number of areas

The Main Courtyard

- A memorial erected in honour of fallen members of the airborne forces of 44 Parachute Regiment, 44 Parachute Brigade and the South African Special Forces
- A memorial honouring members of 61 Mechanised Battalion Group
- Various field guns such as the 8.8 cm Flak 37 gun, QF 1-pounder pom-pom guns, 5 cm Pak 38, etc.

The GP Capt. "Sailor" Malan Hall with

- Messerschmitt Bf 109
- Messerschmitt Me 262
- Focke-Wulf Fw 190

The GE Brink Hall with

- Hawker Hurricane
- Royal Aircraft Factory S.E.5
- Supermarine Spitfire
- Messerschmitt Bf 109
- de Havilland Mosquito
- de Havilland DH.9
- Hawker Hartebeest
- A Battle of Britain exhibit
- Artifacts from the Royal Air Force
- Artifacts from South Africa's involvement in various world conflicts, such as the Korean War and the two World Wars
- A large medal collection from various veterans of the armed forces, such as General Jan Smuts and General George Brink
- Anglo Boer War exhibits
- An exhibit honouring members of the Native Military Corps (1940–50), Indian Service Corps (1940–42) and the Cape Corps (1940–50)
- An exhibit detailing major events in South African history between the Boer Wars and the 1994 South African general elections. Events covered include the political divisions in the country during the First and Second World Wars, the Rand Rebellion (1921-1922), the sabotage campaign of the Ossewabrandwag during the Second World War and South Africa's involvement in the Angolan Civil War.

Dan Pienaar Gun Park

- Various guns from around the world such as the British Ordnance QF 18-pounder and the BL 6-inch gun Mk XIX and the German 7.7 cm FK 96 field gun.

The FB Adler Hall with

- Sexton self-propelled gun
- M4 Sherman tank
- M3 Stuart tank
- A large number of artillery pieces such as the Ordnance QF 20 pounder and the BL 5.5-inch Medium Gun
- Exhibits detailing South Africa's involvement in World War II, including artefacts such as uniforms, firearms, helmets, and flags from various countries
- Anglo-Zulu War exhibits
- South African Border War exhibit
- A small South African Navy exhibit
- A large collection of uniforms, ceremonial swords, infantry swords, cavalry swords, bayonets and daggers
- A large variety of small arms from around the world, such as the Bren light machine gun, the M1 Garand, Mauser rifles, Lee–Enfield rifles, the Maxim gun, the MG 42, the Thompson submachine gun, the Winchester Model 1876, the AK-47, the Vektor R4 Rifle R1 Rifle, and various other muskets, rifles and machine guns.

Outdoor exhibits

- A small 32 Battalion indoor exhibit
- Molch one man submarine
- QF 4 inch Mk XVI naval gun turret from a South African Navy Loch-class frigate
- Aircraft such as the Blackburn Buccaneer S Mk 50, the Douglas C-47 'Dakota', the Dassault Mirage III and the Impala MkII
- South African/British armoured vehicles such as the Comet tank, the Centurion tank, the Crusader tank and the Churchill tank
- Captured Angolan/Cuban/Soviet vehicles such as the T-34/85 tank, the T-54/55 tank and the PT-76 amphibious tank
- Captured Italian/German vehicles such as the Carro Veloce CV-35 tank and the Sd.Kfz. 251 half-track
- A large collection of heavy artillery featuring the G5 howitzer and the G6 howitzer

Lt Gen AML Masondo Library building with

- A library with literature concerning South Africa's military history
- Armoured vehicles such as the Alvis Saracen, Ford Lynx, Ratel-20, Daimler Ferret, M9A1 Half-track, Universal Carrier, several different models of the Marmon-Herrington and Eland Mk7 armoured cars, etc.
- More artefacts of World War I and World War II

Capt W F Faulds VC MC Centre

- Opened in 1995, built using insurance funds from the theft of the William Faulds medals, and consists of
  - The Delville Wood Room, a seminar and conference room which contains a plaster-cast of a Danie de Jager relief from the Delville Wood South African National Memorial in France.
  - The Marrières Wood Room, a gathering and dining room.

== See also ==
- South African Air Force Museum
- South African Naval Museum
- Military history of South Africa
- James Hall Transport Museum
