= Pioneer Village =

Pioneer Village may refer to:

== Canada ==
- Fanshawe Pioneer Village, an open-air museum in London, Ontario
- Lang Pioneer Village Museum, an open-air museum in Peterborough, Ontario
- The Village at Black Creek (formerly known as Black Creek Pioneer Village) an open-air museum in Toronto, Ontario
  - Pioneer Village station, a subway station in Toronto, Ontario located near the museum

== South Africa ==
- Pionier Museum, an open-air museum in Pretoria

== United States ==
- Pioneer Village, Kentucky, a city
- Pioneer Village (Colorado), an open-air museum in Hot Sulphur Springs, Colorado
- Pioneer Village (Salem, Massachusetts)
- Pioneer Village (Nebraska), a museum and tourist attraction in Minden, Nebraska
- Pioneer Village (Utah), a "living museum" in Farmington, Utah
- Pioneer Village (Texas), an open-air museum in Corsicana, Texas

== Other museums ==
- Pioneer Museum (disambiguation)

== See also ==
- Open-air museum
- Settlement (migration)
