= Pioneer Museum =

Pioneer Museum may refer to:

== United States ==
- Pioneer Museum Complex in Fredericksburg, Texas
- Colorado Springs Pioneers Museum in Colorado Springs, Colorado

== Other museums ==
- Pioneer Museum (Finland)
- Pionier Museum, Pretoria
- Pioneer Village (disambiguation)

== See also ==
- Intentional community
- Open-air museum
- Plantation (settlement or colony)
