= Ditsong National Museum of Natural History =

Natural history museum in Pretoria, South Africa

- Transvaal Museum
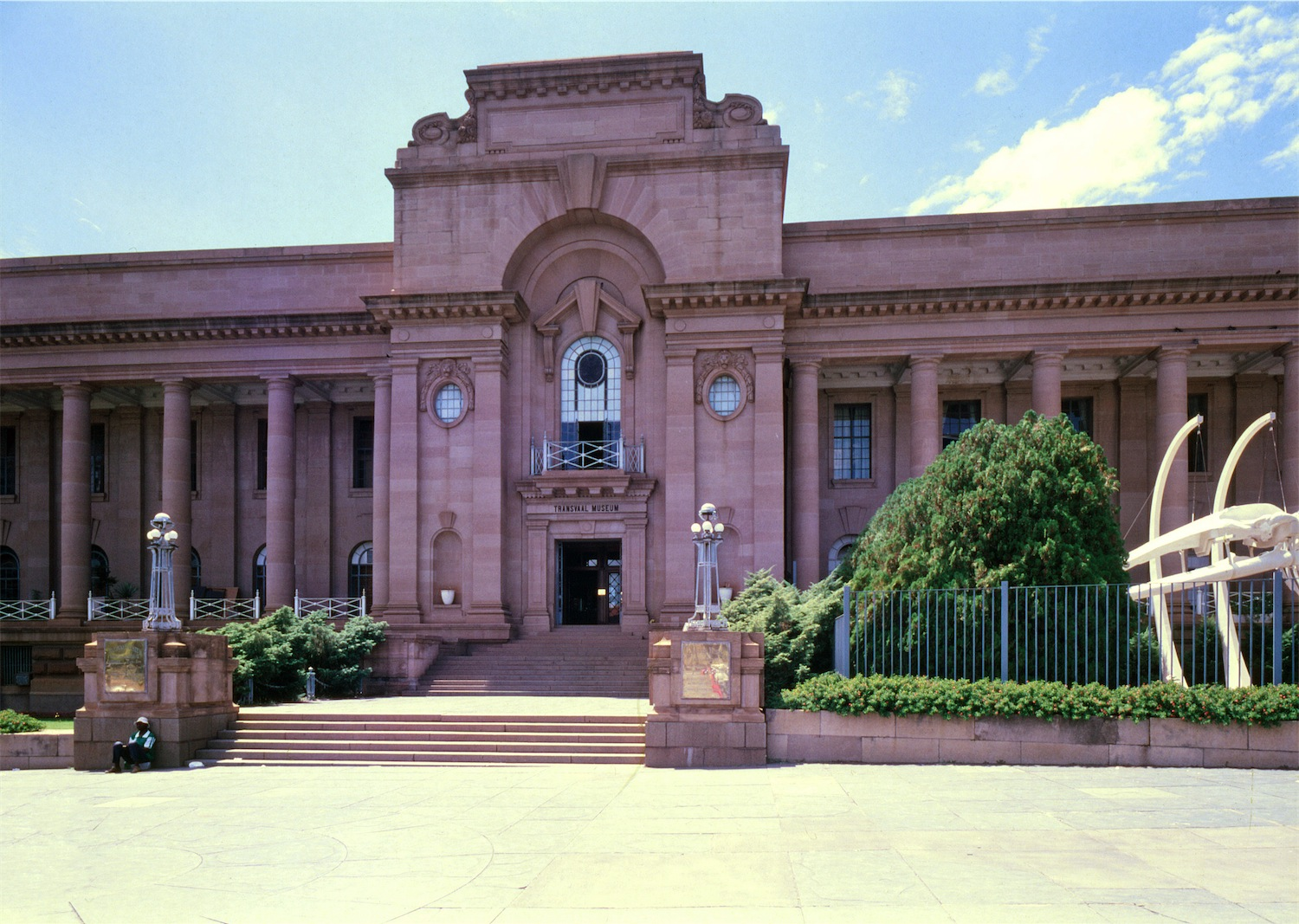
- Facade of the museum building
- Established: December 1, 1892; 133 years ago
- Location: Pretoria, Gauteng, South Africa
- Coordinates: 25.75325°S 28.18899°E
- Type: Natural history
- Founder: J. W. B. Gunning
- Public transit access: A Re Yeng Bus route F5
- Website: http://www.ditsong.org.za/

Ditsong Museums of South Africa network
- Natural History; Military History; Cultural History; Agricultural History; Pionier Museum; Sammy Marks Museum; Tswaing Meteorite Crater; Kruger Museum

The Ditsong National Museum of Natural History, formerly the Transvaal Museum, is a natural history museum situated in Pretoria, South Africa. It is located on Paul Kruger Street, between Visagie and Minnaar Streets, opposite the Pretoria City Hall. The museum was established in 1895 by the former South African Republic, also known as the Transvaal. In 2010 it was one of the founding museums of Ditsong Museums of South Africa.

== Collections ==
The museum curates large collections of Plio-Pleistocene fossils, including hominids from Sterkfontein, Swartkrans and Kromdraai in the UNESCO World Heritage Site; the Cradle of Humankind, as well as late Permian therapsids (proto-mammals from the Karoo). The most complete skull of an Australopithecus africanus specimen, Mrs Ples, is on display in the museum. In addition, the Transvaal museum houses extensive collections of mammals, birds, reptiles, and invertebrates.

== History ==
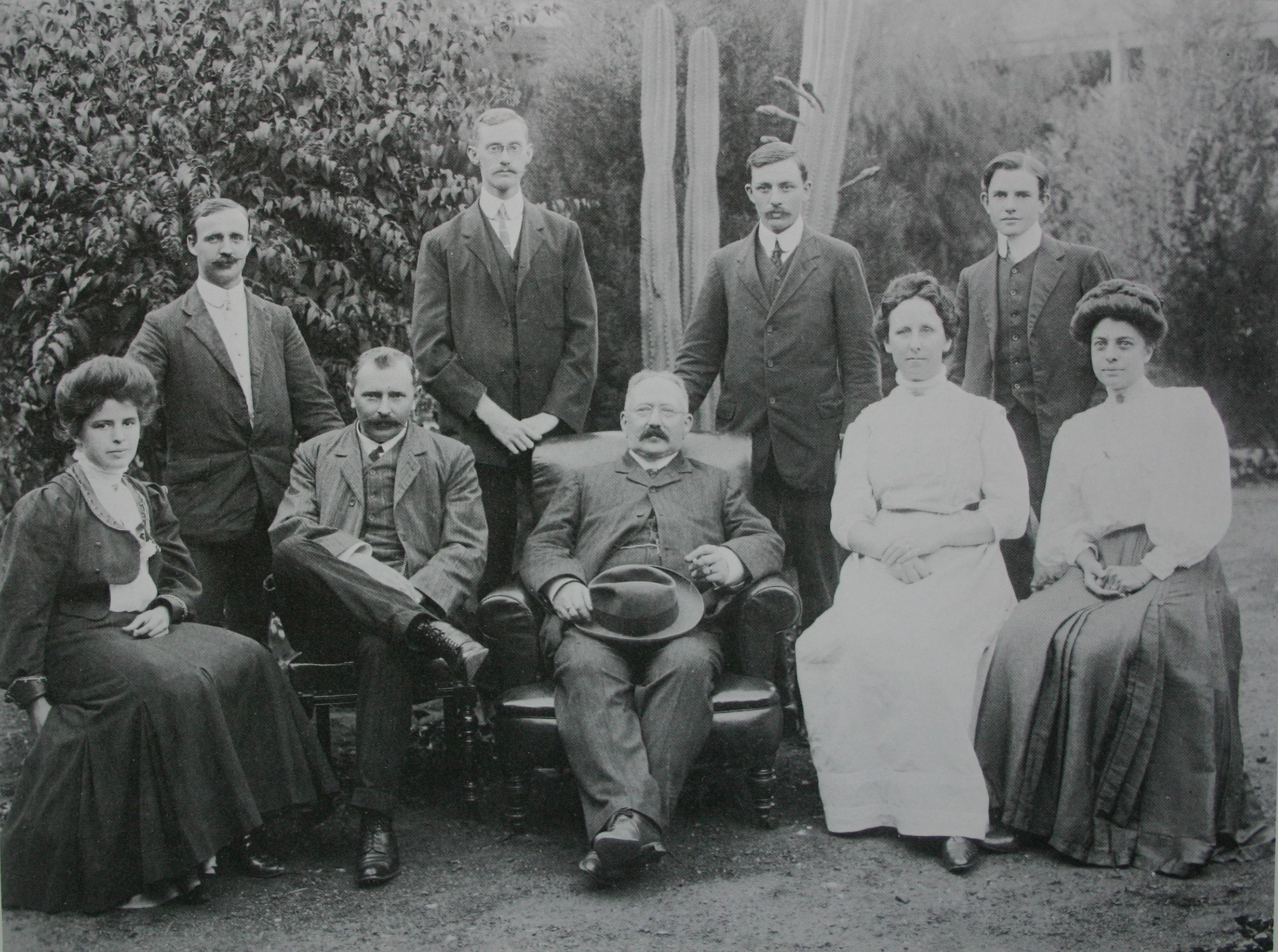
Staff of the Transvaal Museum in March 1909

It was founded as the Staatsmuseum (Afrikaans for "State Museum") of the ZAR on 1 December 1892, and J. W. B. Gunning was appointed as its first director. For the first two years after it was founded, the museum was located in the Ou Raadsaal parliament building.

The Transvaal Museum was amalgamated with the Pretoria-based National Cultural History Museum (also called the African Window) and the South African National Museum of Military History (situated in Johannesburg) on 1 April 1999 to form the Northern Flagship Institution. The NFI was officially renamed Ditsong Museums of South Africa in April 2010. The Transvaal Museum was renamed Ditsong National Museum of Natural History on the same date. Ditsong is managed by a chief executive officer and a board, which replaced the three separate previous museum boards.

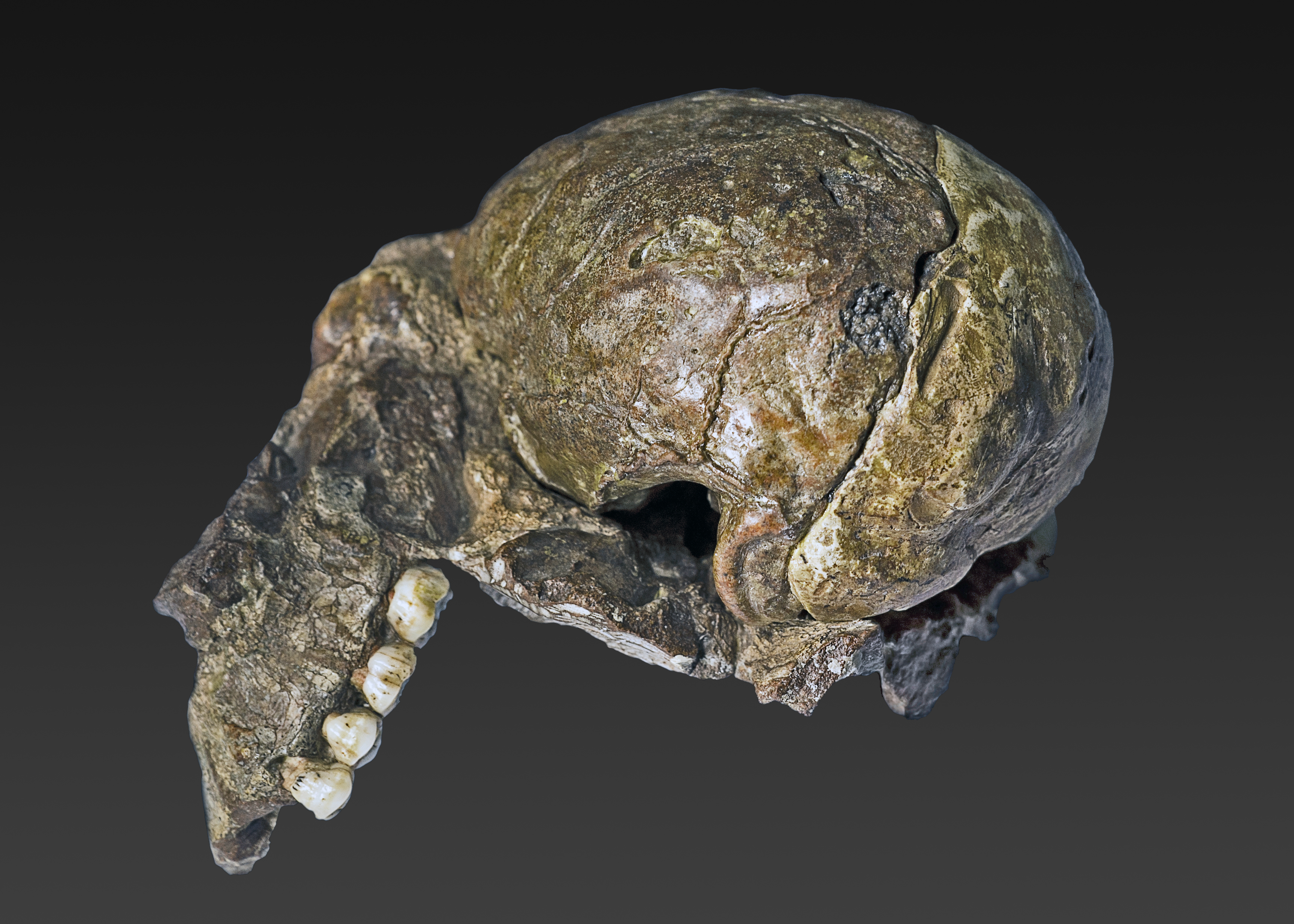
Australopithecus africanus (Sts 60).
