= Tswaing crater =

Impact crater in South Africa

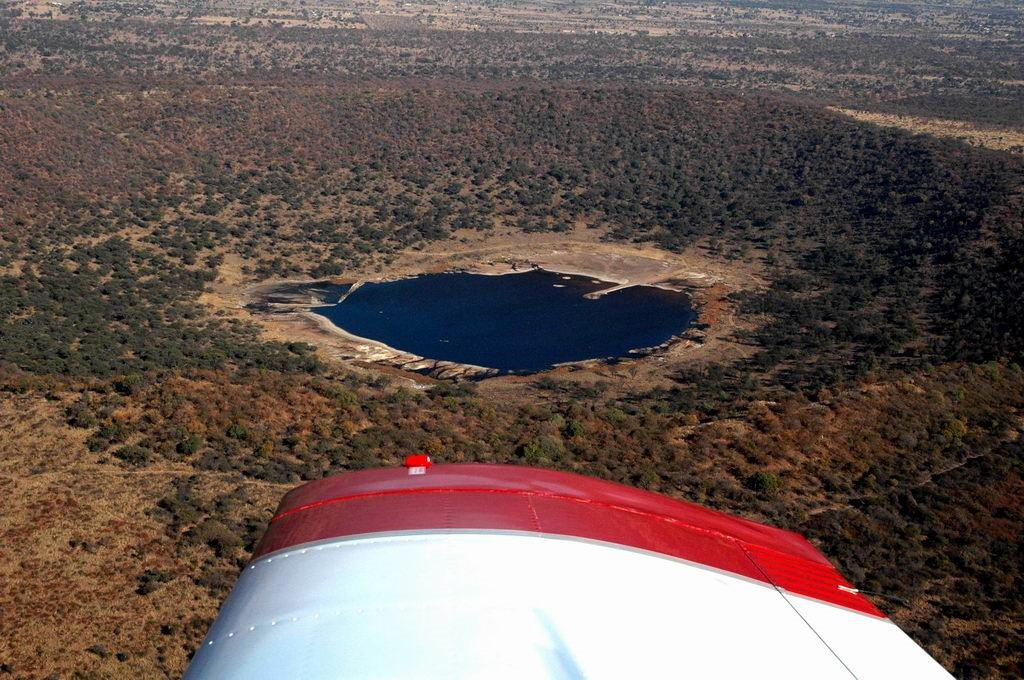
- Tswaing crater as seen from above

- Location within South Africa Location within Gauteng Location within Africa
- Location: South Africa; 25°24′32″S 28°4′58″E

Impact crater structure
- Confidence: Confirmed
- Diameter: 1.13 km (0.70 mi)
- Depth: 100 m (330 ft)
- Impactor diameter: 30 to 50 m (98 to 164 ft)
- Age: 220 ± 52 Ka

Tswaing (Tswana for "place of salt") is an impact crater enclosed by a 1,946 ha nature reserve, situated in northern Gauteng province, South Africa. The crater and reserve are situated on a base of ancient granite of the Bushveld Igneous Complex, some 40 km to the north-northwest of Pretoria (just north of Soshanguve). This astrobleme is 1.13 km in diameter and 100 m deep and its age is estimated to be 220,000 ± 52,000 years (Pleistocene). The impactor is believed to have been a chondrite or stony meteorite some 30 to 50 m in diameter that was vaporised during the impact event. Morokweng impact structure, another South African crater of chondrite origin, lies north-west of Vryburg. Since 1996 it falls under the auspices of Ditsong Museums of South Africa.

== Etymology ==
The name Tswaing means "place of salt" in Tswana and the crater was also formerly known in English as the Pretoria Saltpan crater and in Afrikaans as Soutpankrater, due to the highly saline lake on the crater floor.

== Palaeoclimatology ==
Lipid biomarkers and carbon and hydrogen isotopic ratios from the lake indicate the existence of regional humid climatic periods between 84,000 and 80,000 years BP and between 50,000 and 39,000 BP. In contrast, intervals of high aridity occurred around 76,000 BP, from 73,000 to 69,000 BP, from 55,000 to 51,000 BP, and from 31,400 to 12,600 BP. Since 84,000 BP, the vegetation of the region around the lake has been dominated by savanna-type plants.

== History ==
Stone tools from the Middle Stone Age show that the crater was regularly visited by people from as far back as 100,000 years ago in order to hunt and collect salt. Water in the crater comes from surface springs, ground water and rain water and is rich in dissolved carbonates and sodium chlorides. Tswana and Sotho people harvested the salt by filtering and decoction between 1200 and 1800. Between 1912 and 1956 brine was pumped from the floor of the crater by the company SA Alkali Ltd. in order to extract soda and salt.

A scientific dispute was ongoing regarding the origin of the crater between supporters of volcanic origin (Wagner, 1922) and those who believed it is an impact crater (Rohleder, 1933) until 1990, when examination of the core from a borehole proved that it is an impact crater.

== Museum ==
Tswaing Meteorite Crater
- "Place of Salt"
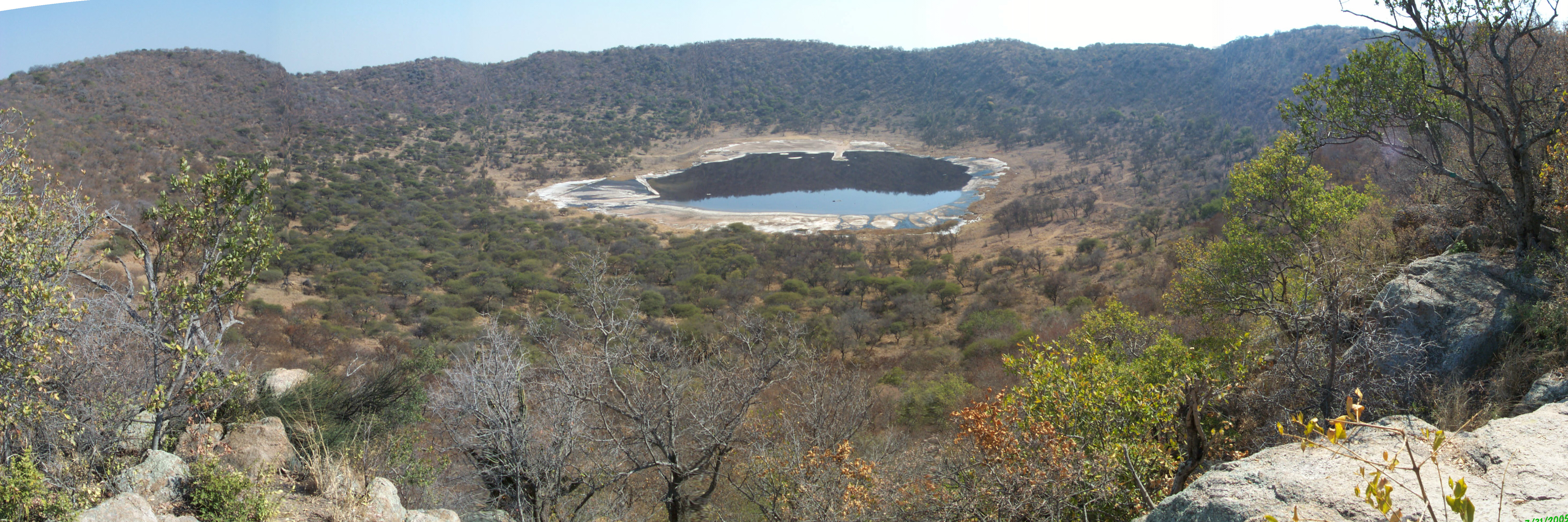
- Crater seen from its eastern rim
- Location: Pretoria, Gauteng, South Africa
- Coordinates: 25.408486°S 28.082529°E
- Type: Natural history
- Public transit access: Onderstepoort Road ( M35), Soshanguve, Pretoria
- Website: ditsong.org.za/en/tswaing-meteorite/

Ditsong Museums of South Africa network
- Natural History; Military History; Cultural History; Agricultural History; Pionier Museum; Sammy Marks Museum; Tswaing Meteorite Crater; Kruger Museum

The impact crater is accompanied by the Ditsong Tswaing Crater Museum.

== Status of protection ==
Tswaing is currently on the tentative list for consideration as a World Heritage Site.

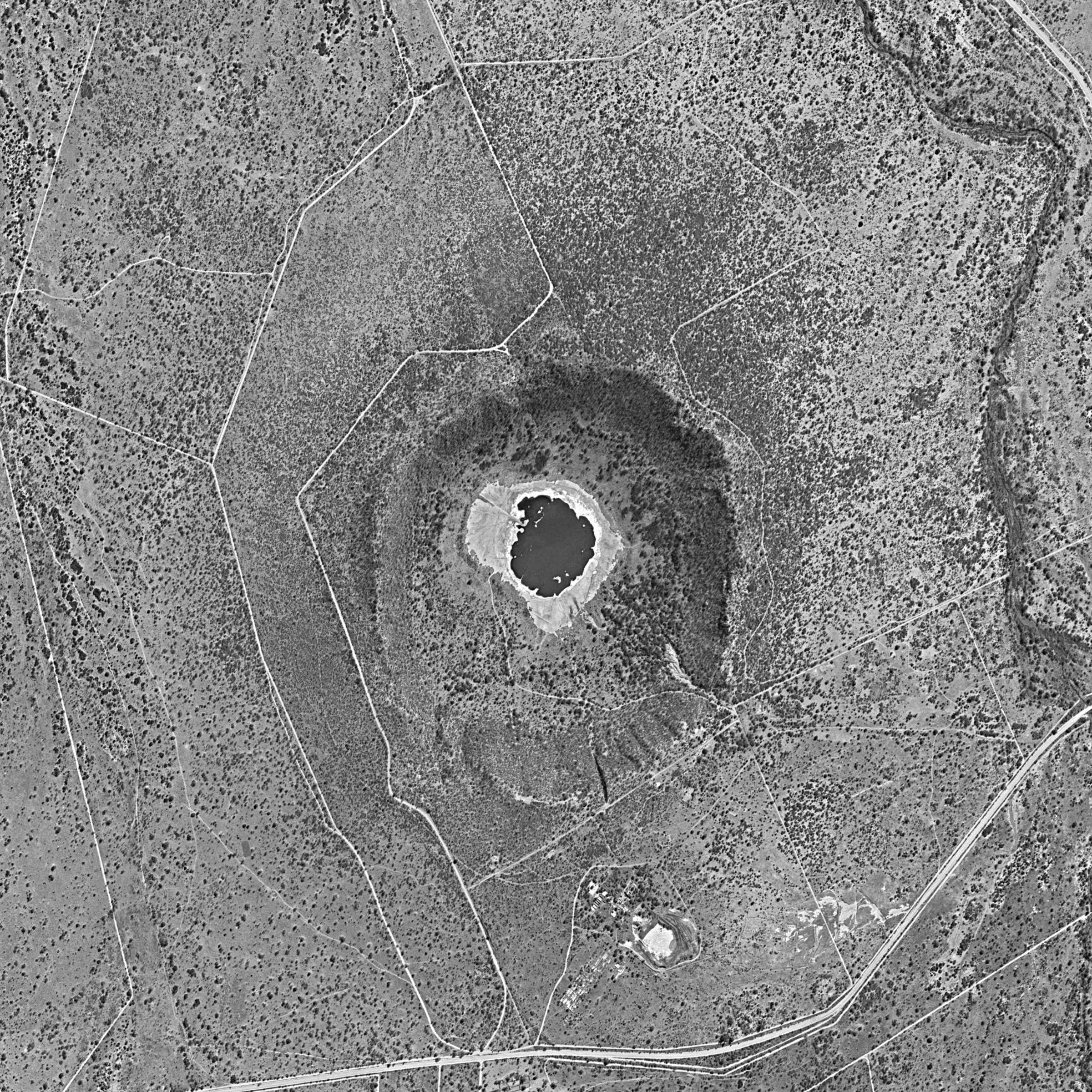
Satellite photo of Tswaing crater in 1984

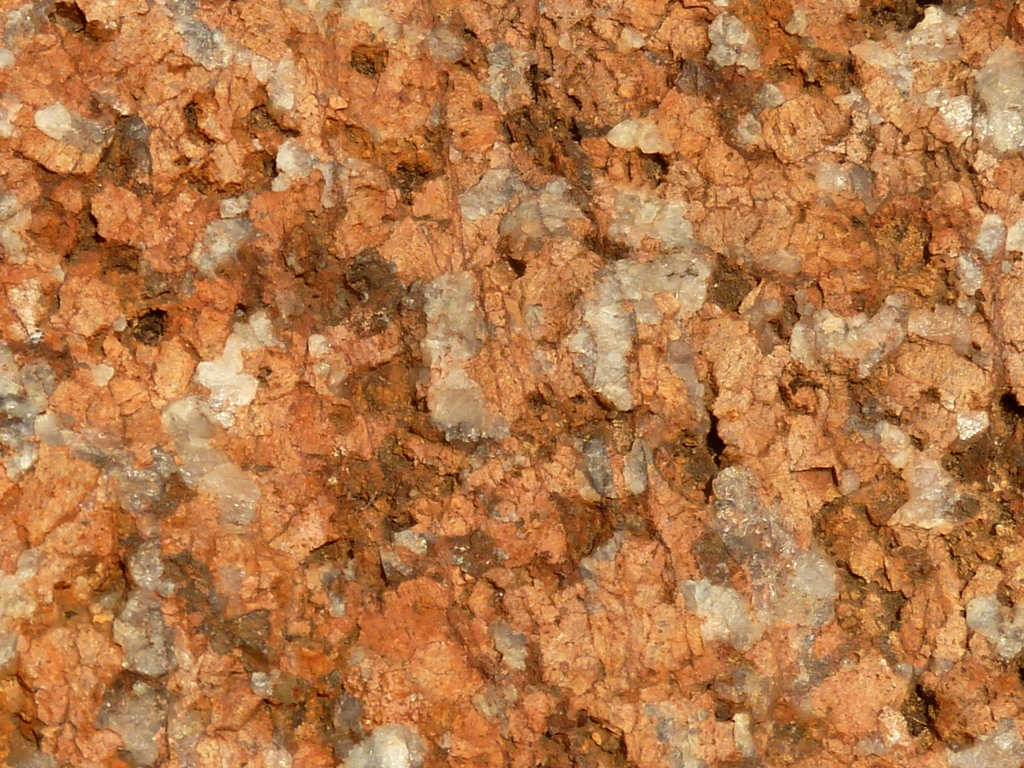
Nebo granite of the Bushveld Igneous Complex, from the crater wall

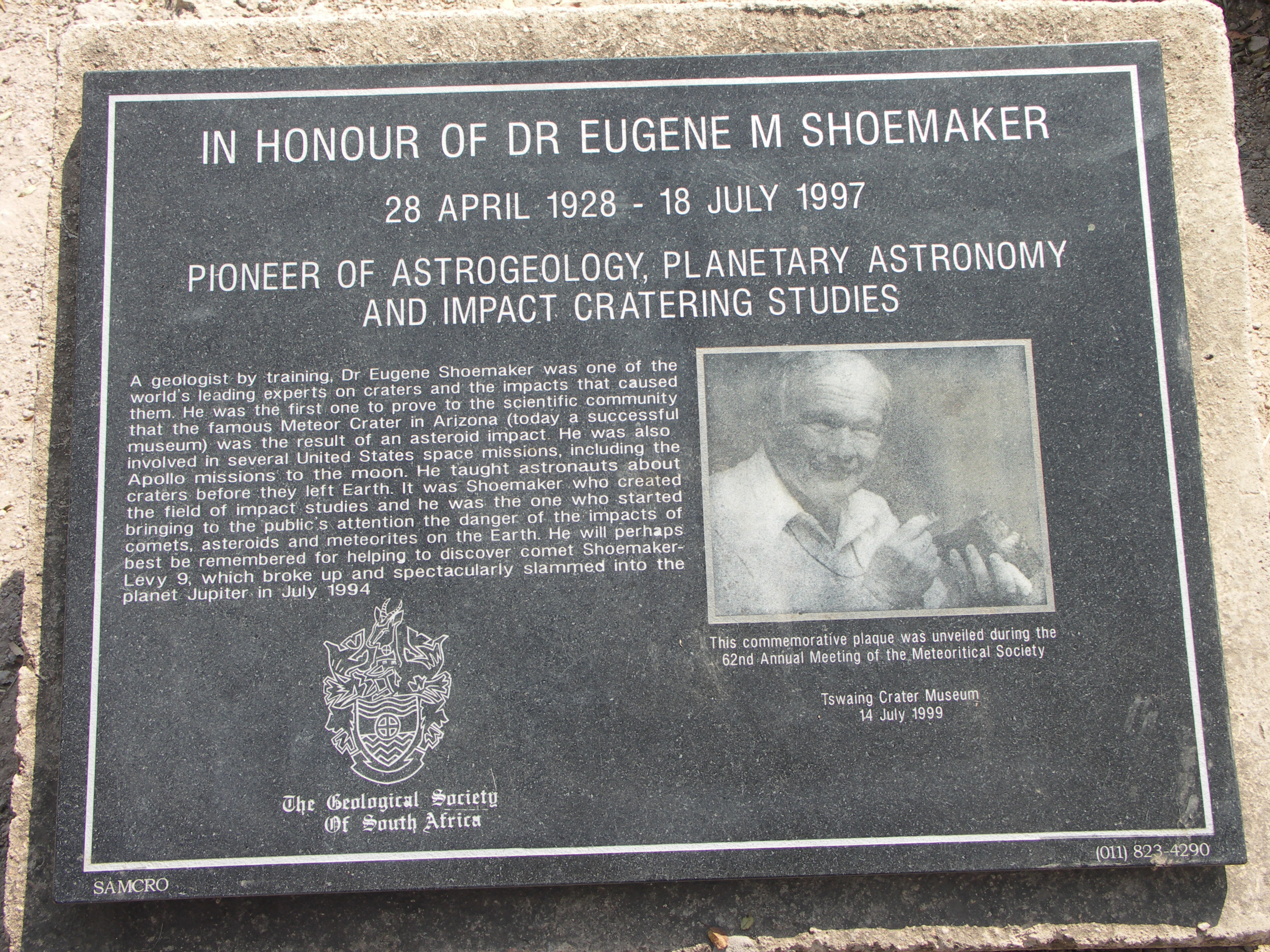
Memorial to Eugene Merle Shoemaker who showed that craters such as Tswaing are formed by impact

== See also ==
- Impact event
- List of impact craters in Africa
