= Alois Hugo Nellmapius =

South African businessman

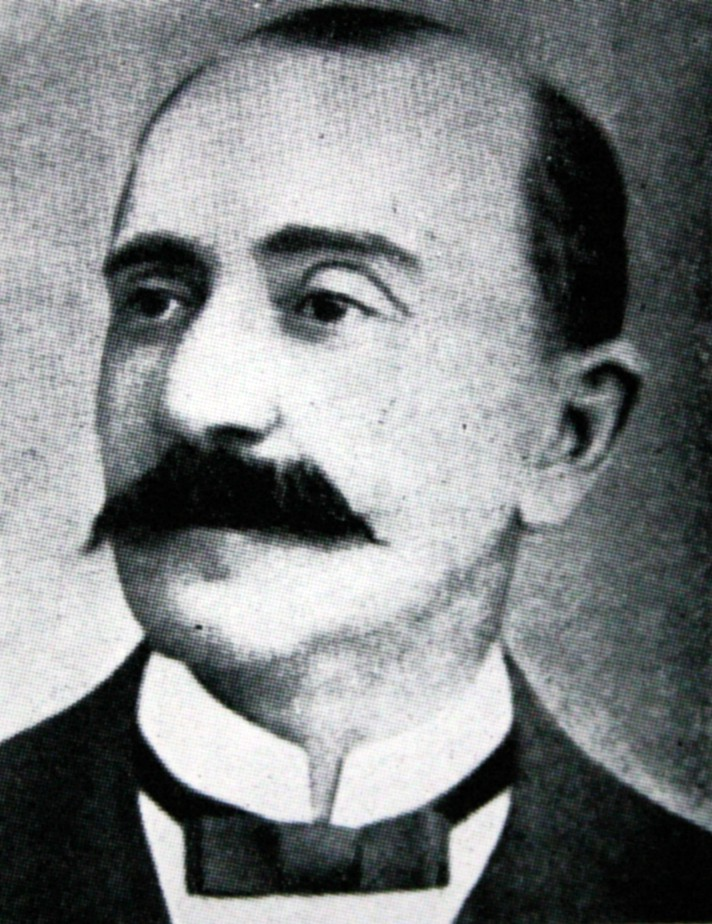
Alois Hugo Nellmapius

Alois Hugo Nellmapius (5 May 1847 – 27 July 1893), was a South African businessman, industrialist and pioneer conservationist.

== Life and career ==
Born in Bielitz Poland on 5 May 1847. His given name was Alois Hugo Neumann the son of Albert and Charlotte Neumann, but upon coming to South African changed his last name for reasons unknown. He trained as an engineer in the Netherlands and arrived in South Africa on board the ship Nathan in 1873 - one of his fellow passengers was John X. Merriman, later Prime Minister of the Cape Colony. This was the year that gold was first found in the ZAR. He was successful at gold mining near Pilgrim's Rest in the Eastern Transvaal, and managed to obtain the first transport concession to Delagoa Bay in 1875. He constructed what is now known as the Nellmapius Road, from Mac-Mac and the goldfields, crossing the Crocodile River at Nellmapius Drift near Hectorspruit to Matalha Poort in Mozambique. For these services he was granted 4 farms. Nellmapius made and lost several fortunes in his lifetime and was a close friend of Paul Kruger, there is a plaque in the National Kruger Park commemorating this very thing. He was the first digger on the Transvaal goldfields to make use of dynamite.

Nellmapius served in the Sekhukhune Wars and the Mapoch campaign. He established Irene Estate (named after his daughter) near Pretoria and bought a number of farms on the Hennops River. He employed horticulturists Richard Wills Adlam, who had been the Curator of the Pietermaritzburg Botanical Garden, and his successor, Hans Fuchs. Under their management and with a temperate climate, ample water and fertile soil, they transformed the land into an extensive flower, fruit and vegetable garden of world renown. Flora Shaw of "The Times" of London, visited the Irene Estate in 1892 and was astounded at the scale of the farm and gardens: "With the exception of cherries, gooseberries and currants, all European fruits flourish well. Throughout the estate the water courses, which divided the fields, were bordered by hedges of quince, pear, apple, plum and peach...acres of roses, violets and ornamental plants surrounded the house..."

Kruger House, situated in Church Street West, Pretoria, and built in a Victorian veranda style, was designed by Tom Claridge, one of Pretoria's first architects and was erected on the instructions of Nellmapius.

He also owned the Pretoria newspaper De Pers. Due to lack of funds he lost a Government manufacturing contract at Eerste Fabrieken to Sammy Marks. His first enterprise was the Hatherley Distillery that produced gin and whisky on the farm Hatherley, opened by President Kruger on 6 June 1883 and named Volkshoop. He started the first gunpowder factory in South Africa and the Irene Lime Works. On the death of Nellmapius, Marks took over his concessions for the distillery, canning fruit and a ceramics factory. A portrait of Nellmapius is to be seen on the second floor of the Sammy Marks Museum.

Nellmapius often entertained in grand style at Irene and a frequent guest was Transvaal president, Paul Kruger. Arnold Theiler's first employment in South Africa was with Nellmapius. He married Johanna Corlydia Hoffman in 1882, their son Ernest Harold was born in 1890. Nellmapius lived at the Irene Estate until his death in 1893, he was buried in the 'Golden Acres Cemetery' in Church street in Pretoria where Paul Kruger and many others of that time were buried.

== Books ==
- The Tycoon & The President: The life and times of Alois Hugo Nellmapius, 1847-1893 - Helga Kaye (Macmillan, South Africa 1978) ISBN 978-0-86954-073-2 to 2021
