= Ditsong Museums of South Africa =

Museums in Gauteng Province

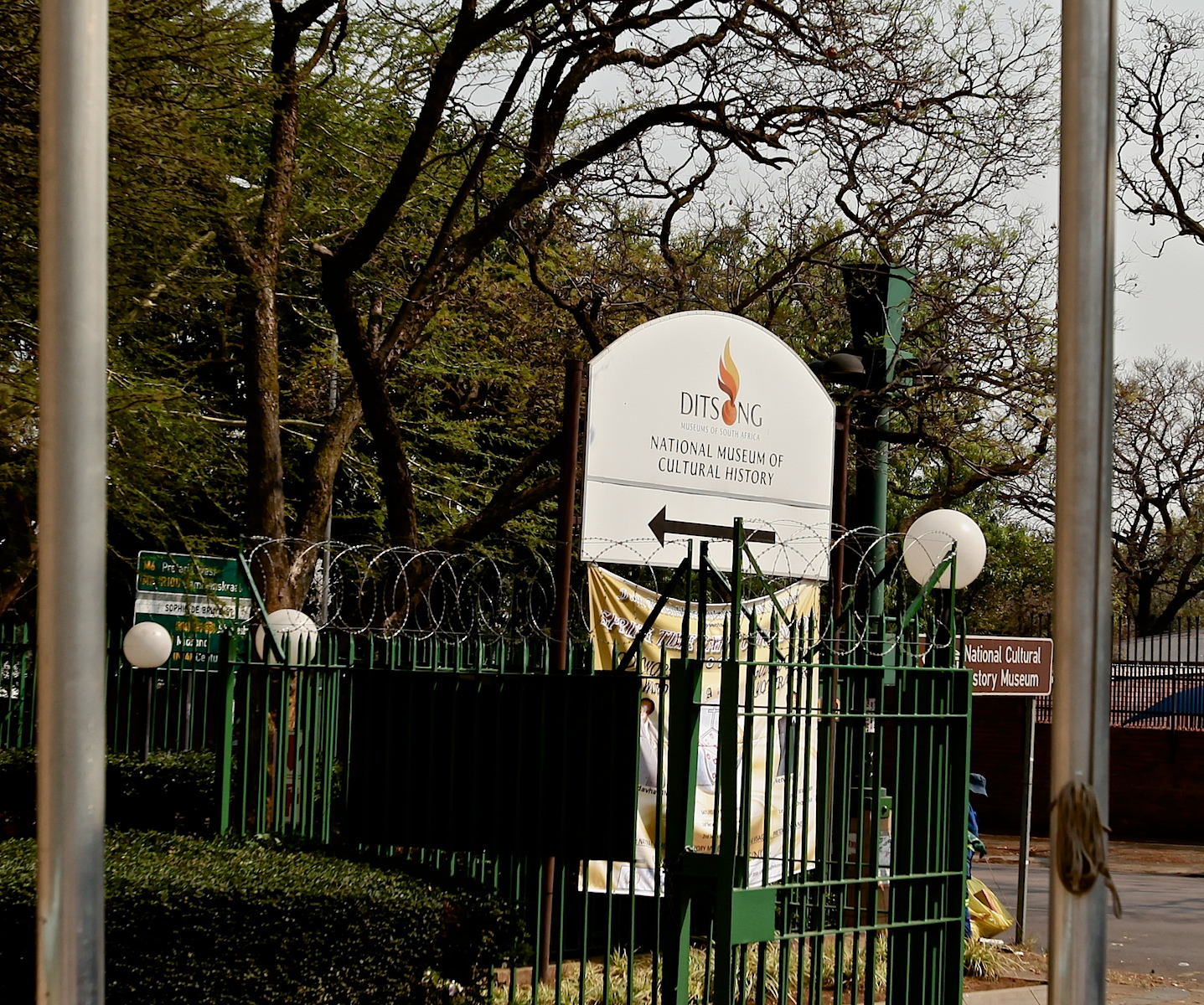
- Ditsong Cultural History Museum entrance

Museum network overview
- Formed: 2008; 17 years ago
- Headquarters: 70 WF Nkomo (Church) Street, Pretoria, South Africa
- Museum network executives: Dr M. Mohapi, Acting Chief Executive Officer; Mr N. Hlophe, Chief Financial Officer
- Parent department: Department of Sports, Arts and Culture
- Website: https://ditsong.org.za

Ditsong Museums is an amalgamation of eight museums in the Pretoria and Johannesburg environs in the Gauteng Province. The museums "have diverse collections covering the fields of fauna and flora, palaeontology, military history, cultural history, geology, anthropology and archaeology."

== Museums ==
Ditsong manages several institutions from its central headquarters in the former Native Affairs building on Church street, Pretoria.

- Ditsong National Museum of Natural History
- Ditsong National Museum of Military History
- Ditsong National Museum of Cultural History
- Pionier Museum
- Sammy Marks Museum
- Tswaing Meteorite Crater
- Kruger Museum
- Willem Prinsloo Agricultural Museum

== Mandate ==
According to the website the "mandate of the organisation is as follows:

- Collection, conservation and safe management of national heritage collections on behalf of the South African nation.
- Carry out research and publish such information for the cultural, social and economic use locally and internationally.
- Design, implement and manage exhibitions and public programmes with a view to supporting the national educational curriculum, economic development and other socio-economic objectives of the Government.
- Render heritage-based service to other museums (national, provincial, local and private) as well as to individuals and tertiary institutions."
