= Willem Prinsloo Agricultural Museum =

Agricultural museum in Gauteng, South Africa

- Established: 1976; 49 years ago
- Location: Rayton, City of Tshwane, South Africa
- Coordinates: 25.778940°S 28.549300°E
- Type: Agricultural museum
- Website: Willem Prinsloo Agricultural Museum

Ditsong Museums of South Africa network
- Natural History; Military History; Cultural History; Agricultural History; Pionier Museum; Sammy Marks Museum; Tswaing Meteorite Crater; Kruger Museum

The Willem Prinsloo Agricultural Museum is an agricultural museum part of the Ditsong Museums of South Africa. The museum exhibits agricultural technology from the Stone Age through to the Second World War. It is located on the R104 (Old Bronkhorstspruit Road) in Rayton, near Cullinan, Gauteng, South Africa.

== History ==
The Willem Prinsloo Agricultural Museum is located on the farm Kaalfontein; once owned by Willem Prinsloo (nicknamed Willem Wragtag). In 1976, his great-granddaughter Miertjie le Roux donated 16 hectares, a dwelling from 1860 and some outbuildings to the National Cultural History and Open-air Museum. Later the museum bought part of the adjacent farm. Development began in 1976, with the museum officially opening on 29 March 1980.

== Activities ==
The museum hosts several festivals throughout the course of the year. There are outdoor exhibits from various time periods; an 1830 exhibit and a 1913 exhibit. The 3 halls at the museum showcase agricultural vehicles and agricultural machinery used in South Africa.

== See also ==
- James Hall Transport Museum
