= Kruger House, Pretoria =

Building in South Africa

Kruger Museum
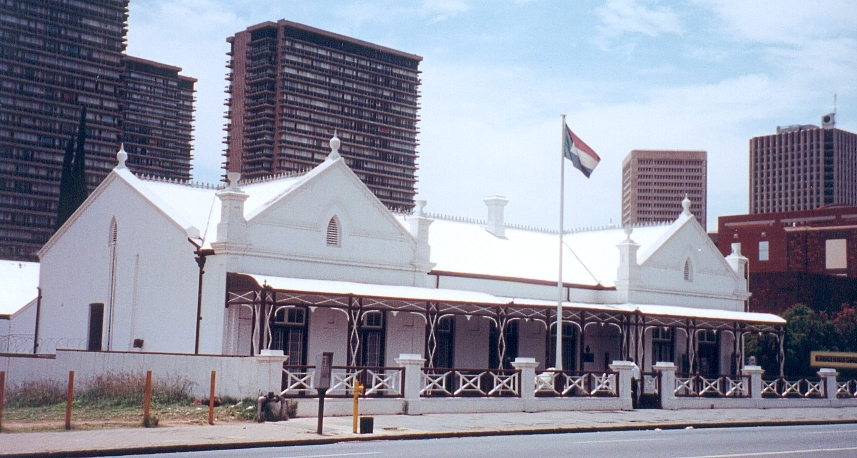
- Kruger House. A view from Church St, Pretoria, in 1998
- Coordinates: 25°44′47″S 28°10′53″E
- Website: Kruger Museum

Ditsong Museums of South Africa network
- Natural History; Military History; Cultural History; Agricultural History; Pionier Museum; Sammy Marks Museum; Tswaing Meteorite Crater; Kruger Museum

Kruger House is the historical Pretoria residence of the Boer leader and President of the South African Republic, Paul Kruger. It was built in 1884 by architect Tom Claridge and builder Charles Clark. Milk was used, instead of water, for mixing the cement from which the house was constructed, as the cement available was of poor quality.

The house was also one of the first in Pretoria to be lit by electricity. The house contains either the original furnishings or items from the same historical period, some of the many gifts that were presented to Kruger as well as other memorabilia.

Another interesting feature of the house is two stone lions on the verandah that were presented to President Kruger as a birthday gift on 10 October 1896 by the mining magnate Barney Barnato.

The Kruger House is now a house museum that tries to recreate the ambience of the period that Kruger lived in.

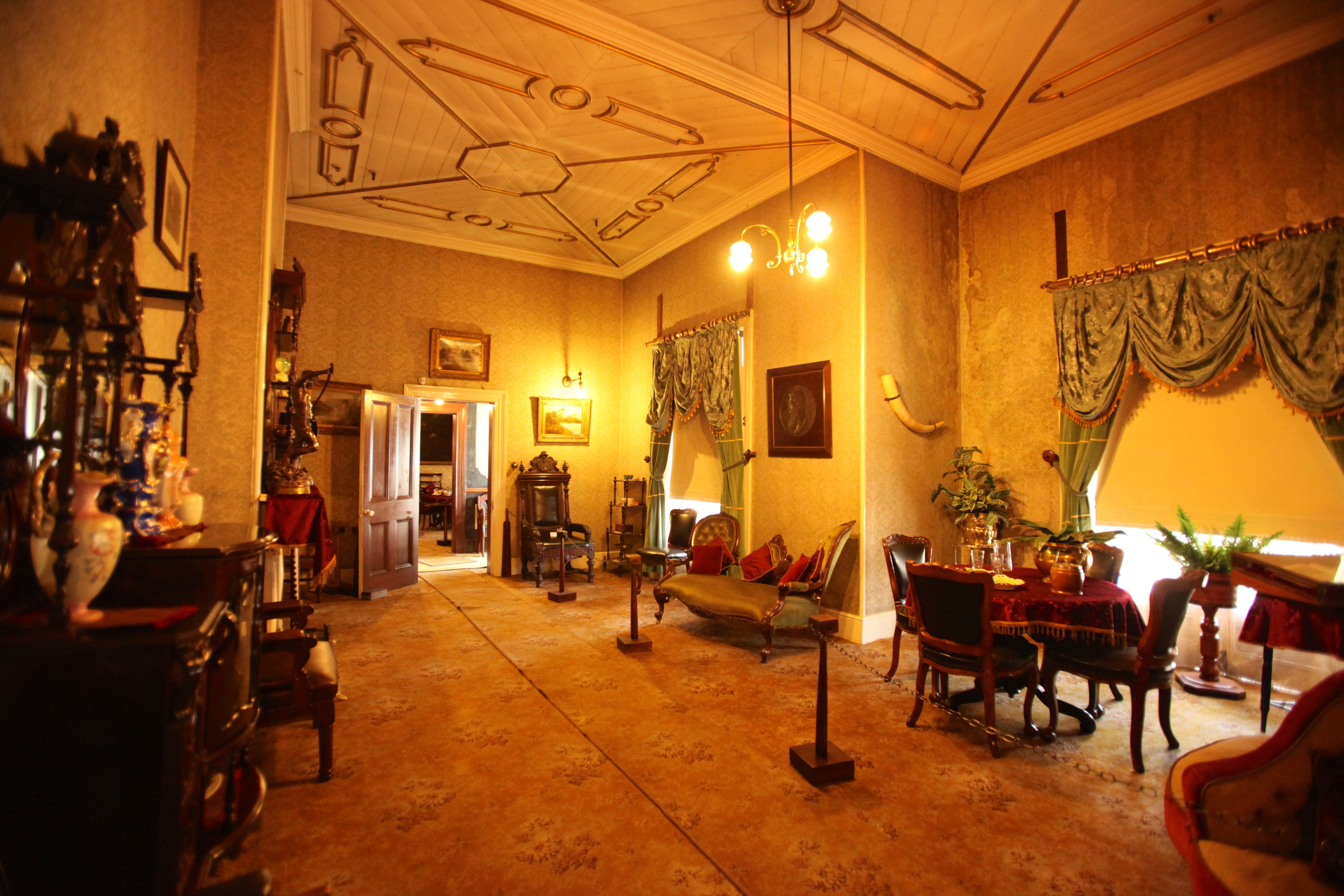
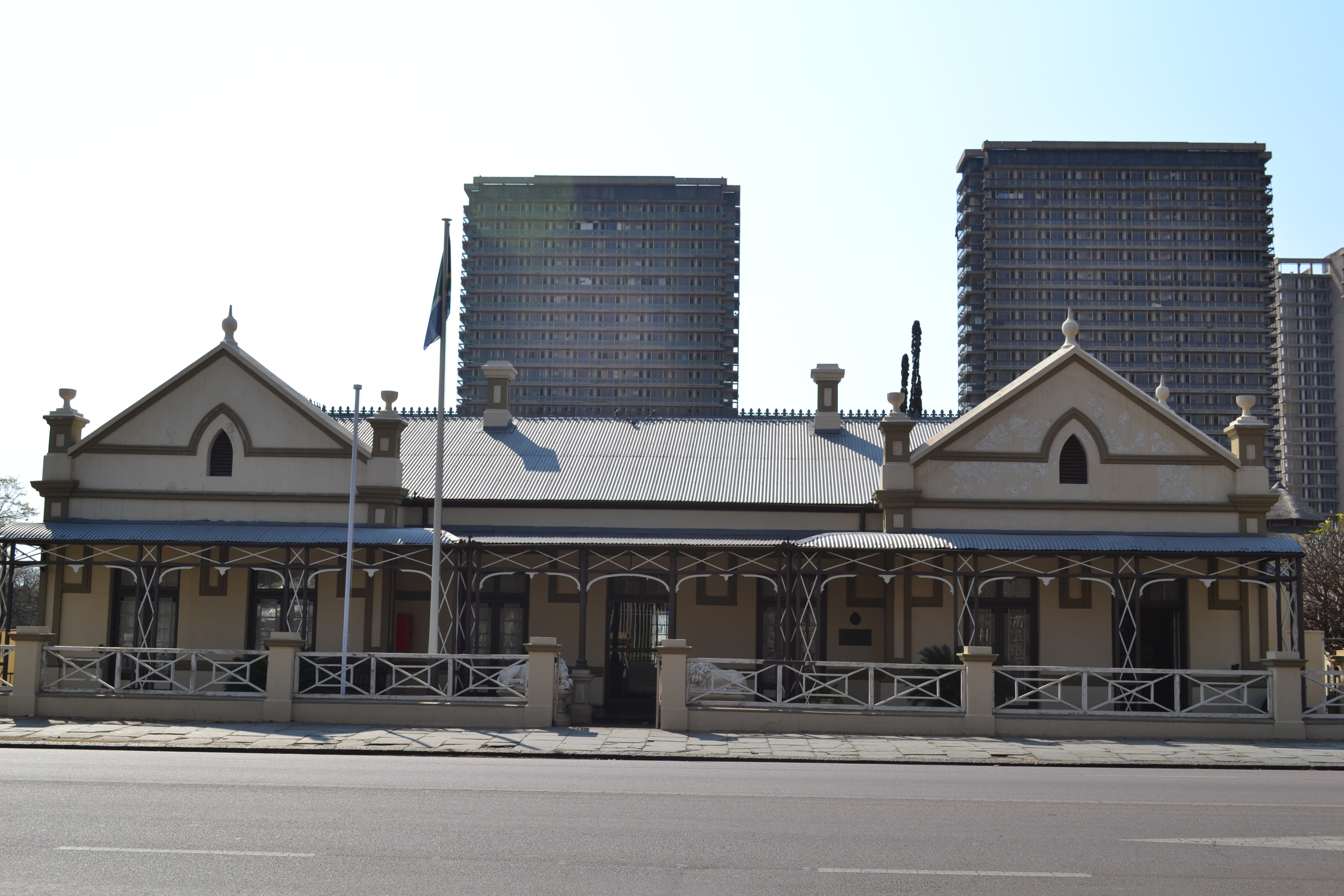

== History ==
After President Kruger became a member of the Volksraad (Parliament) in 1863, he bought several plots of land on Church Street. He originally had a house to the east of today's Kruger House Museum, and later had one to the west of it. In July 1884, the Kruger family moved into the house described in this article, which was built by the prominent businessman Alois Hugo Nellmapius. On 14 August of that year, the President hosted 60 guests, among them members of the Volksraad, lawyers, Cabinet members, and pastors at a dinner party in his "new official residence."

The Kruger House displays a mix of styles. The cornice-moulded gables, the moulding on the front door, and the plastered mouldings show Late Renaissance touches, while the front and back porches show Asian influence. The house is an elongated, simple, and sturdy building. Two large drawing rooms highlight the front of the house, with four bedrooms behind. The long, broad front porch became famous as a place the President would often sit and would sometimes receive visitors.

The President and Mrs. Kruger lived for 15 years and 10 months, more or less, from July 1884 to May 1900, in the Kruger House. Their children - except for Tjaart, the youngest - were already married. On 29 May 1900, shortly before the British took Pretoria, the President left his home for the last time. His wife remained until her death in 1901. Family, friends, and sympathizers came to greet him. A boy named James F. Smith also brought 29,000 signed condolences from American boys.

Shortly before the President's death in 1904, Frederik Christoffel Eloff, son-in-law of the President, purchased the Kruger House from the estate and registered it in the name of his son, Dirk Postma Eloff. In his absence, the house was rented out without his knowledge as a bed-and-breakfast under the name "The Presidency."

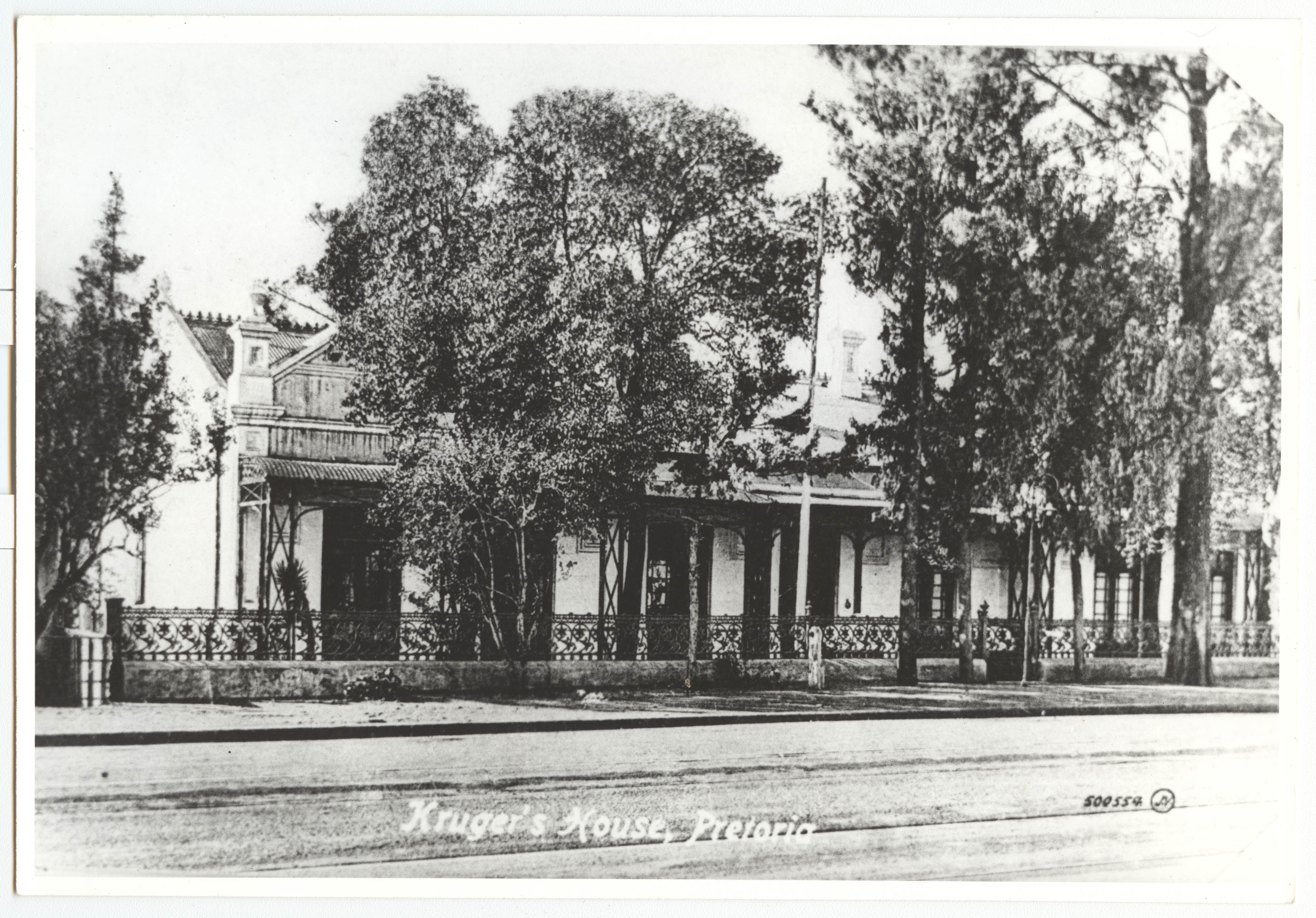
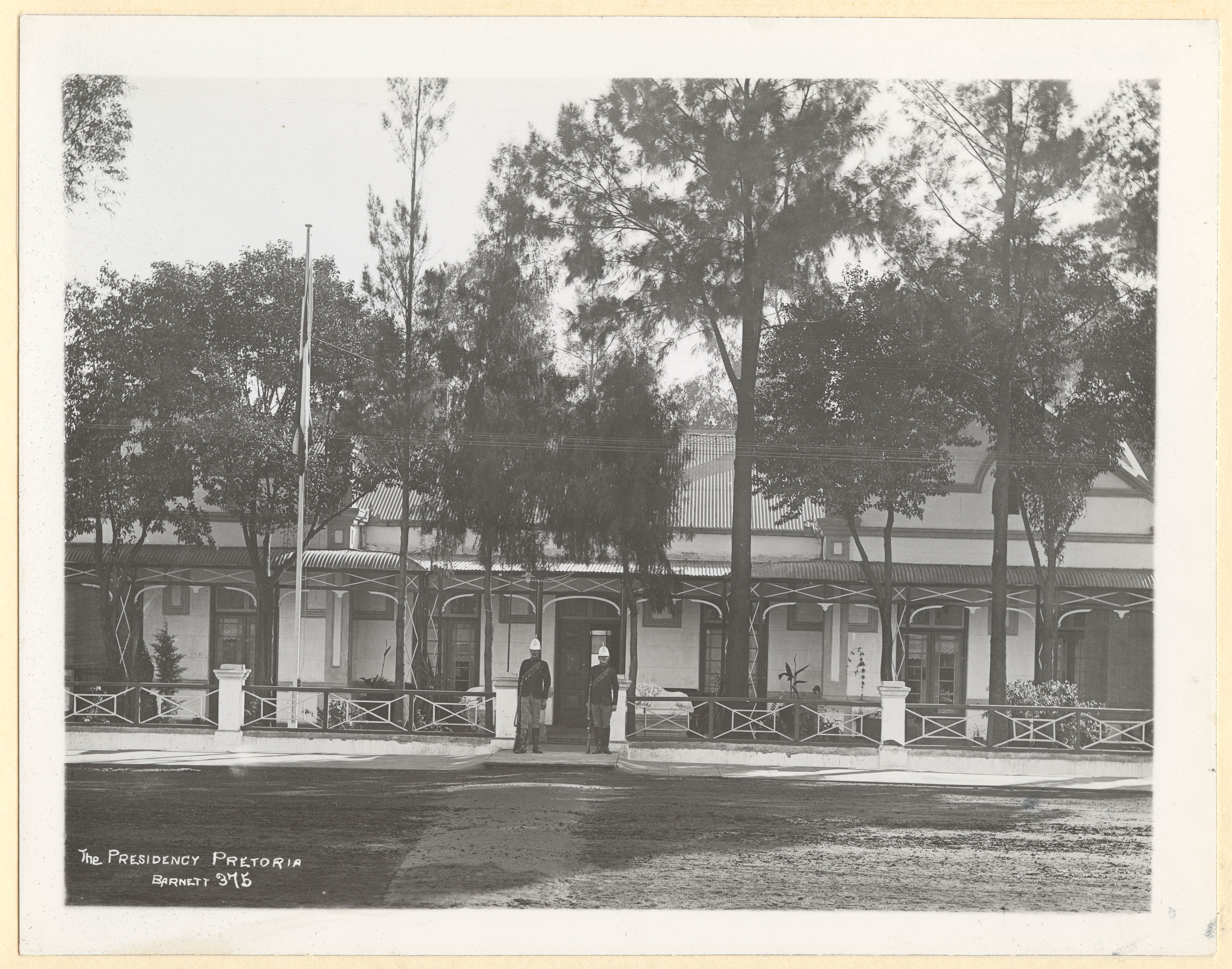

President Kruger was buried in Pretoria on 16 December 1904. The funeral service was held on the grounds, between the Kruger House and the Pretoria Reformed Church (GKSA) on the opposite side of the street. Starting in April 1920, the Kruger House was leased to the Bond of Afrikaanse Moeders, a midwives' training school, as a maternity ward. Many Afrikaners can therefore boast of having born in the Kruger House between 1920 and 1932.

Meanwhile, opinion turned toward making the Kruger House a museum. When several of Kruger's belongings were secured from the Dordrechts Museum in the Netherlands and brought back to Pretoria, this only heightened the impetus; some of these items were originally exhibited in the Old National Cultural History Museum on Boom Street.

The house was officially opened as a museum on 10 October 1934, by Mr. Albert Kuit. People connected with the President, including Mrs. LJ Jacobz, Col. Hermanus Christiaan Bredell, Dr. A. Heymans, and Miss J. van Broekhuizen, donated valuable photographs and other personal mementoes. On 6 April 1936, the house was declared a National Heritage Site. A few outbuildings have been built since then to hold the large number of Kruger memorabilia, as well as an apartment and an office. In 1952, the South African Railways and Harbours Administration donated the President's personal train coach, which the Kruger House later exhibited in the garden under a canopy.

The Kruger House Museum has been entrusted to the National Cultural History and Open Air Museum (Afrikaans: Nasionale Kultuurhistoriese en Opelugmuseum or NASKO). 10 October 1984, the centennial of the house, was also the 50th anniversary of the house's museum status.
