= Isaac Lewis =

South African businessman (1849–1927)

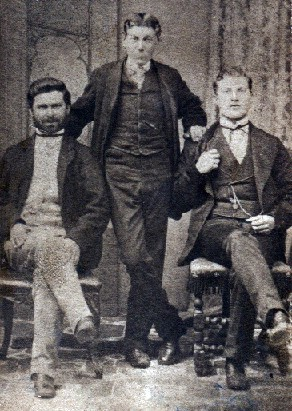
From left to right: Sammy Marks, Barnet Lewis and Isaac Lewis

Isaac Lewis (1849–1927) was a Russian-born South African industrialist of Jewish descent. He was the cousin and partner of Sammy Marks. He arrived in South Africa in 1870 and became a partner in the company, Lewis & Marks. It became one of the largest property and industrial companies in Southern Africa. He was less well known to the public than Marks.

In the late 1890s Lewis purchased grounds from the company Anglo American in Vereeniging and built his own residence, which is now known as the Riviera On Vaal.

Lewis died in 1927 at the age of 78. Lewis street in Vereeniging is named after him.

== Sources ==
- Encyclopedia of South Africa, Eric Rosenthal, 1967
