= Sammy Marks =

South African businessman (1844–1920)

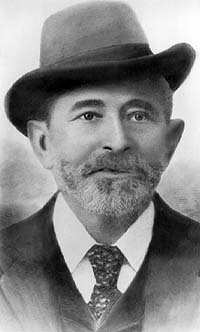
- Born: 11 July 1844; Tauragė, Russian Empire (now Lithuania)
- Died: 18 February 1920 (aged 75); Johannesburg, Transvaal, Union of South Africa
- Organization: Business

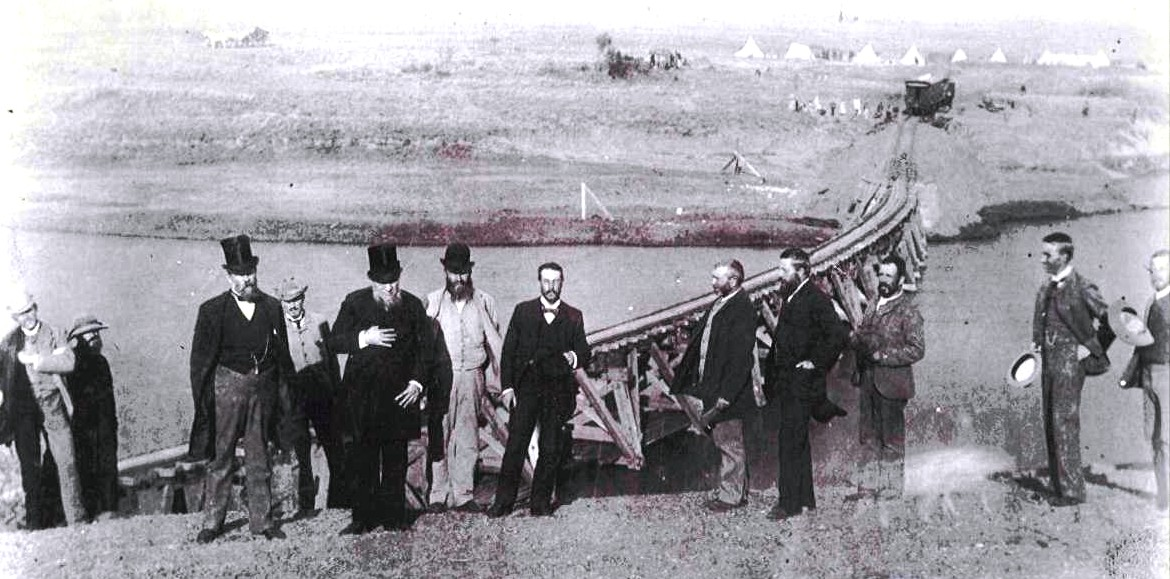
President Reitz of the Free State and President Kruger of the ZAR on the occasion of the joining of the Transvaal and the Orange Free State by railway, 21 May 1892. Sammy Marks stands fifth from the right.

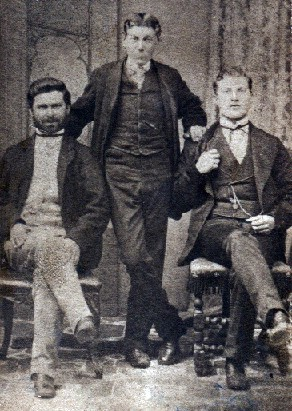
Sammy Marks, Barnet Lewis, Isaac Lewis

Samuel Marks (July 11, 1844 – February 18, 1920) was a Russian-born South African industrialist and financier.

== Life history ==
Marks was born the son of a Jewish tailor in 1844 in Neustadt-Sugind, Russian Empire (now Lithuania). He accompanied some horses to Sheffield in England while still a youth and, not wanting to return to the Jewish persecution in the Russian Empire, decided to stay on. It was in Sheffield that he met his future in-laws. Hearing news of the diamond discoveries in Kimberley, he arrived at the Cape in 1869 and was shortly followed by his cousin Isaac Lewis, also from Neustadt-Sugind, with whom he forged the enduring partnership of Lewis & Marks. Marks started his career as a peddler in the rural districts of the Cape, but soon headed for Kimberley where his rise to prosperity began. They made a modest living supplying goods to mines and diggers, and later branched into diamond trading. Moving to Pretoria in 1881 he gained the confidence of President Kruger and the government of the Zuid-Afrikaansche Republiek (ZAR). His friendship with Kruger became close and enduring and they had in common humble origins and a ready wit. Marks advised that Kruger build a railway line from Pretoria to Lourenço Marques.

With the discovery of gold in the boomtown of Barberton and later on the Witwatersrand, Marks acquired business interests in both places, but found the coalfields of the southern Transvaal and northern Free State to be a more lucrative prospect. The Zuid-Afrikaansche en Oranje Vrijstaatsche Mineralen en Mijnbouwvereeniging was founded in 1892 to mine these coal deposits, and later gave the town of Vereeniging its name. Lewis & Marks business interests included a distillery, a canning factory and a glass factory. Their firm opened collieries at Viljoensdrif and elsewhere, and also started Vereeniging Estates Ltd., which was dedicated to developing agricultural land along the Vaal River. Marks pioneered the use of steam tractors and progressive farming implements. He also sponsored the establishing of flour-mills and brick and tile works at Vereeniging. In 1910 Marks was nominated as senator in the first Union Parliament, an office he held until his death. When A. H. Nellmapius was unable to execute a manufacturing contract he had concluded with the Government due to lack of funds, Lewis & Marks took over and constructed the Eerste Fabrieken near Pretoria.

Marks contributed generously to Jewish communities all over South Africa. The Old Synagogue was built in 1898, for which he donated all the bricks and paid for the electric light installation and chandeliers. In 1906, he settled the synagogue's mortgage. At the end of the Anglo-Boer War, he presented a cast-iron fountain to the city of Pretoria, shipped from Glasgow and very Edwardian in design, it stands at the Zoological Gardens in Pretoria. Marks commissioned the statue of Kruger on Church Square in Pretoria – sculpted by Anton van Wouw and cast in bronze in Europe, it carried a price tag of £10,000.

== Sammy Marks tickey ==
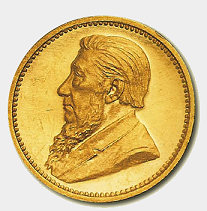

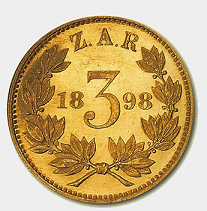

In 1898 Marks was allowed the extraordinary privilege of using the state mint for a day. Marks used the opportunity to strike 215 gold tickeys – three-penny pieces that were normally silver – as mementos for his relatives and friends, including President Kruger himself and members of the Volksraad. The gold would certainly have come from the Sheba mine near Barberton, the only gold mine in which Marks had a substantial stake. This famous incident says much about the close relationship that these two men had. There was often a blurring of the boundary between personal and State property. Their relationship was almost feudal, as that of a king and highly regarded subject. Besides President Kruger, Marks enjoyed the trust of the Boer Generals Botha, De Wet, and de la Rey, and the respect of Earl Roberts, Lord Kitchener, and Lord Milner, and he played a not inconsiderable part in the negotiations for the cessation of Anglo-Boer hostilities at Vereeniging on 31 May 1902.

For many years, Marks had planned an iron and steel works in the Transvaal, and had visited Britain to inspect the installations there at first hand. When he landed a contract with the Government in 1911 for smelting large quantities of scrap metal, he founded in 1912 the Union Steel Corporation.

Sammy Marks died in Johannesburg on 18 February 1920.

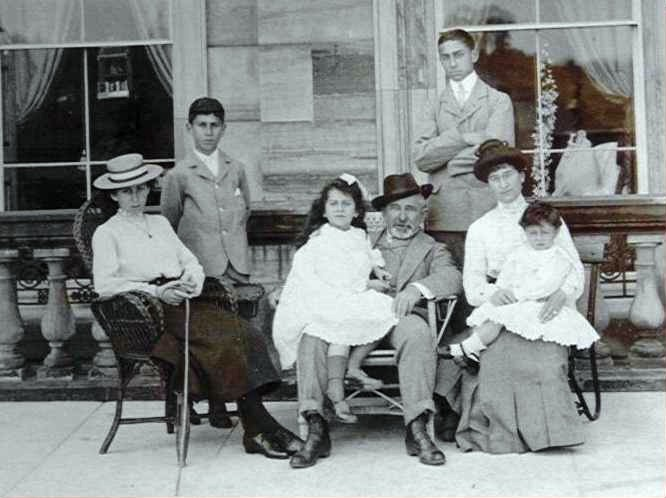
Marks and his family on a visit to England c. 1903. From left to right are Gertrude (Girlie) 1889, Joe 1892, Dolly 1897, Sammy, Louis 1885, Bertha and Phil 1900. Ted 1894 is absent

== Family life ==
At forty years of age and a very wealthy man, Marks started thinking about marriage. He returned to Sheffield in England and married Bertha Guttmann, eighteen years his junior. This was an arranged marriage set up by Bertha's father who helped with Sammy's success during the years. Bertha was only 5 years old when Sammy set foot on the Cape's soil. From this union nine children were born, six boys and three girls. Only six children survived infancy. Having himself received a limited schooling, Marks set great store by education and saw to it that the children were taught at home by governesses – boys until the age of eight, girls until the age of twelve and then they were sent to private schools in England.

Sammy could speak 5 different languages and had a mind for business.

Marks had bought the farm Zwartkoppies to the east of Pretoria and there he began the construction of his home. The name originates from the black rock around the farm which has iron in and is by nature black rocks. This also attracts electric storms. He drew the initial plans for the house on a piece of wood and got a local builder to construct the house according to his rough sketch plan. The house is a very cold place as he built the house facing West which does not work in the Southern Hemisphere.

Marks built a grand 40 odd room Victorian mansion, Zwartkoppies Hall, on the farm near Pretoria, which became well known to celebrities and dignitaries visiting South Africa. Sammy and Bertha moved into the house in 1886. Sammy had an Italian painter paint the walls on silk material so that the walls would look like they were made of silk. Beautiful patterns decorated each room of the mansion. Having the same restless energy that led to Marks's success, his wife Bertha controlled the house and its staff with ease, managing to raise nine children, breed poultry, maintain a garden, and entertain on a lavish scale. Luncheons, dinners, croquet on the lawn, tennis and billiards parties were all regular events. There was no dinner party, and no Sunday, which passed without a 5 course meal attended by 30+ guests. A staff of 13, most of whom were engaged through an agency in London, carried out the housework: parlourmaids, kitchenmaids, laundrymaids and gardeners, as well as a governess, a cook, an estate carpenter and a Scottish butler. A massive stove in the kitchen, with five ovens and 10 hot-plates, testified to the scale of the entertainment.

Bertha, having married a very wealthy man, was often abroad buying décor for the mansion from France, Germany, India etc.

Dolly was the youngest daughter to be born; doctors was afraid she wouldn't make it after birth as she only weighed 780 grams at birth. She lived a full life and died aged 96 years. The oldest son, Louis was very full of himself and had this attitude after studying in England, referring to himself as "Young Lord Louis", even signing his letters with the initials "YLL". Sammy once entered a party where the coat boy took his hat and jacket and tipped the young man a generous 1 pound. After taking the tip, the boy turned to Sammy and asked if he could tip him more as his son Louis tipped him five pounds when he came in earlier. Sammy looked at the young man and replied with a well thought comeback: "Remember that my son has a very rich father, I on the other hand, do not."

Gertrude was Sammy's oldest daughter and also favourite child as they were the closest to one another. She was very talented and went to England for her studies, where she met a young Christian boy. She was only sixteen at the time. After writing her father a very long letter explaining to him that she had met the love of her life and intended to marry him and convert to Christianity, Sammy being a Russian Jew, he was disappointed and livid at the same time. He immediately sent for her to be fetched and brought back to South Africa where Gertrude, heartbroken, refused to marry in her life. She kept herself busy by attending charities and helping the less fortunate, but she never courted a man. She is buried on the Zwartkoppies farm.

Joseph was the son who never wanted to be a businessman, and told his father that he wanted to be a farmer when grown up. He demanded his curtains, bedding, carpet, everything in his room be the colour of green. Joseph studied agriculture and ran the farm after the death of his father, in addition to running his own nearby farm. Not liking the mansion's walls being decorated by the beautiful patterns, he painted over them, causing extensive damage. The mansions walls are being renovated as the funds are available, being painstakingly removed by a scalpel, carefully not to damage the original layer. Six layers of paint by Joseph nearly destroyed 171 years of art.

== Museum ==
Ditsong Sammy Marks Museum
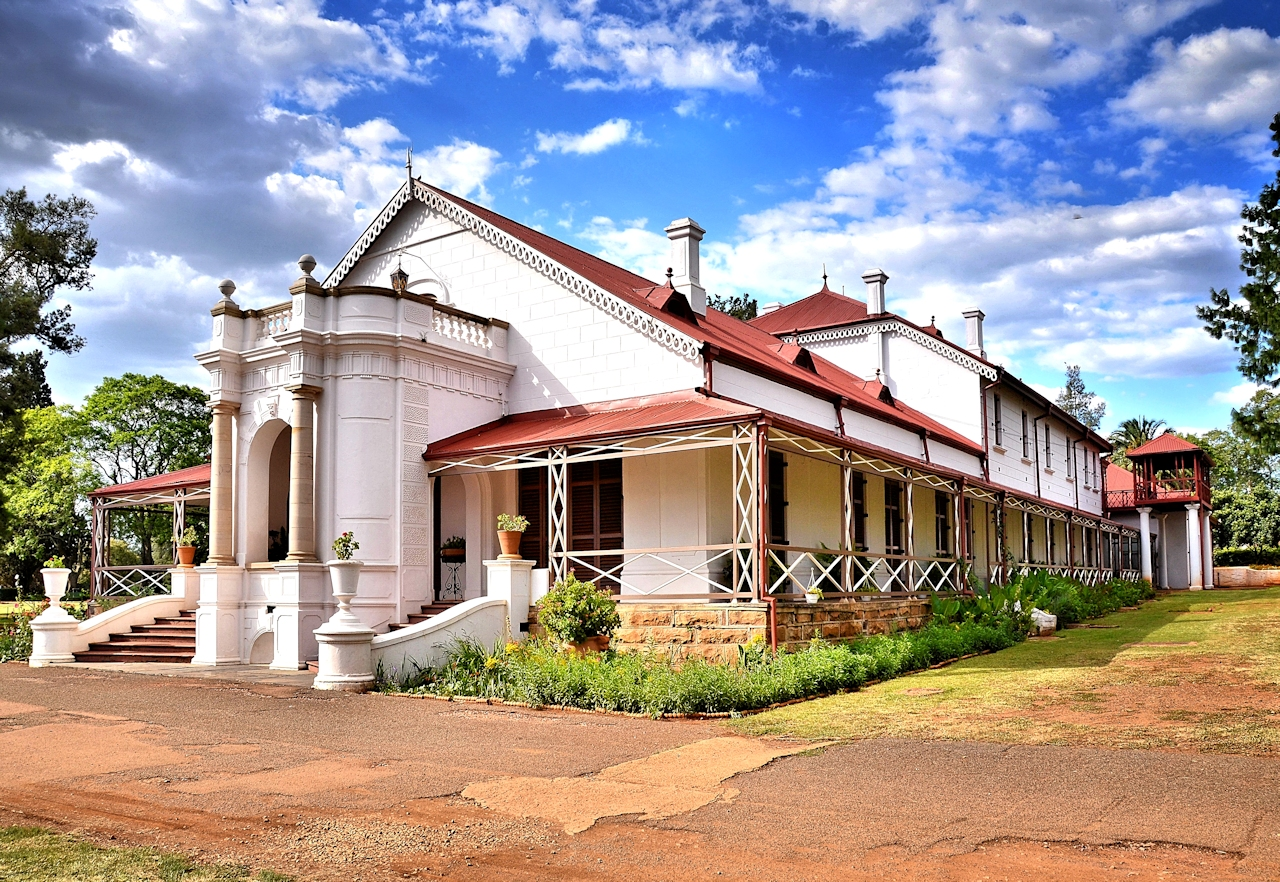
- Coordinates: 25.75015°S 28.38024°E
- Website: Sammy Marks Museum

Ditsong Museums of South Africa network
- Natural History; Military History; Cultural History; Agricultural History; Pionier Museum; Sammy Marks Museum; Tswaing Meteorite Crater; Kruger Museum

After Marks' death, his widow and some of the children lived in the house until the death of the last one in 1981. After a period of standing vacant, the family realised it was in need of maintenance and a suitable tenant was sought. In 1984, an agreement was reached with the National Cultural History Museum according to which the Government was to buy the contents of the house from the estate, restore the house and rent it from the family trust. In 1986, the Sammy Marks Museum opened its doors to the public. In 1995, roughly 73ha surrounding the house and upon which all of the historical buildings are situated, was cut from the rest of the farm and sold to the National Cultural History Museum. Today the Sammy Mark's Museum forms part of the Ditsong Museums of South Africa. Every Sunday a brass band plays in the gardens of Zwartkoppie Hall.

== Gallery ==
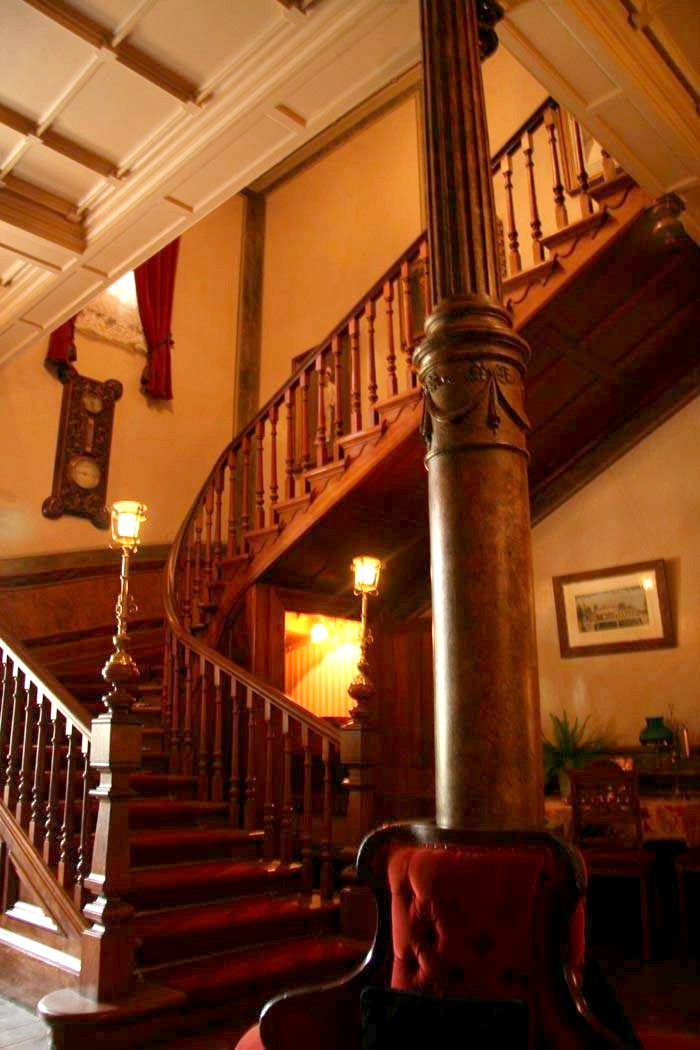

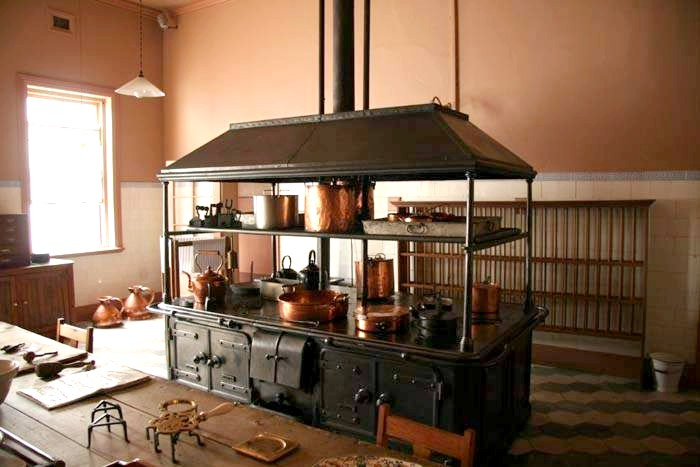

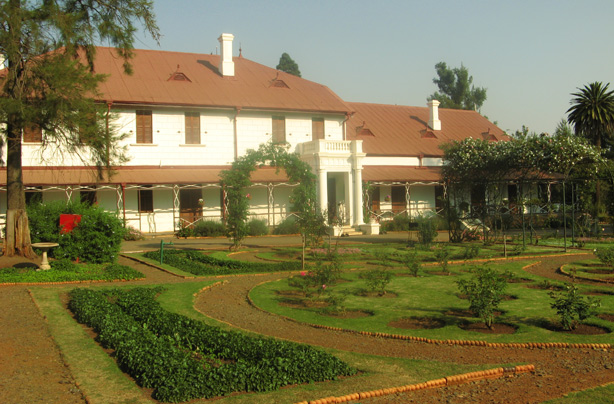
Sammy Marks House, Zwartkoppies, Pretoria

== See also ==
- List of Castles and Fortifications in South Africa
