= Ditsong National Museum of Cultural History =

National Museum of Cultural History of South Africa

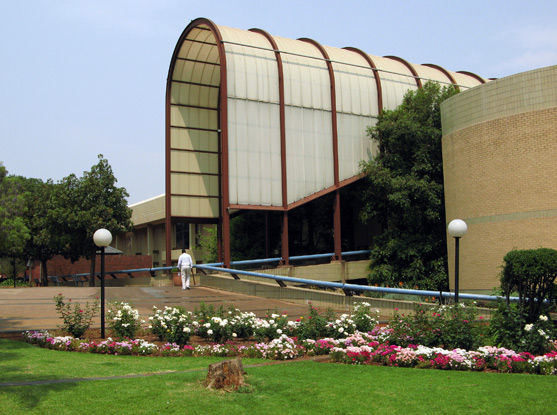
- Ditsong National Museum of Cultural History entrance
- Location: 149 Visagie Street, Pretoria, Gauteng
- Coordinates: 25°45′12″S 28°11′4″E
- Type: Cultural history
- Public transit access: Gautrain bus dropoff
- Website: Ditsong National Museum of Cultural History

Ditsong Museums of South Africa network
- Natural History; Military History; Cultural History; Agricultural History; Pionier Museum; Sammy Marks Museum; Tswaing Meteorite Crater; Kruger Museum

The Ditsong National Museum of Cultural History is a museum that showcases the various stages and forms of culture in South Africa. It is part of the Ditsong Museums of South Africa. The museum is located in Pretoria, Gauteng, South Africa.

== History ==
The Ditsong National Museum of Cultural History is housed in the old South African Mint building. The museum was amalgamated with the Pretoria-based Transvaal Museum for Natural History (now the Ditsong National Museum of Natural History) and the Johannesburg-based South African National Museum of Military History on 1 April 1999 to form the Northern Flagship Institution (NFI), and the NFI was renamed the Ditsong Museums of South Africa in April 2010. The Ditsong Museums of South Africa are managed by a chief executive officer and a board, which replaced the three separate boards of its component institutions.

== Exhibits ==
The collection of the museum includes historical documents, excavated archaeological material and artworks and various current and historical audio-visual materials. Topics that feature in its work include Stone Age, Iron Age and historic archaeology sites, historical buildings and early domesticated animals.

== Gallery ==
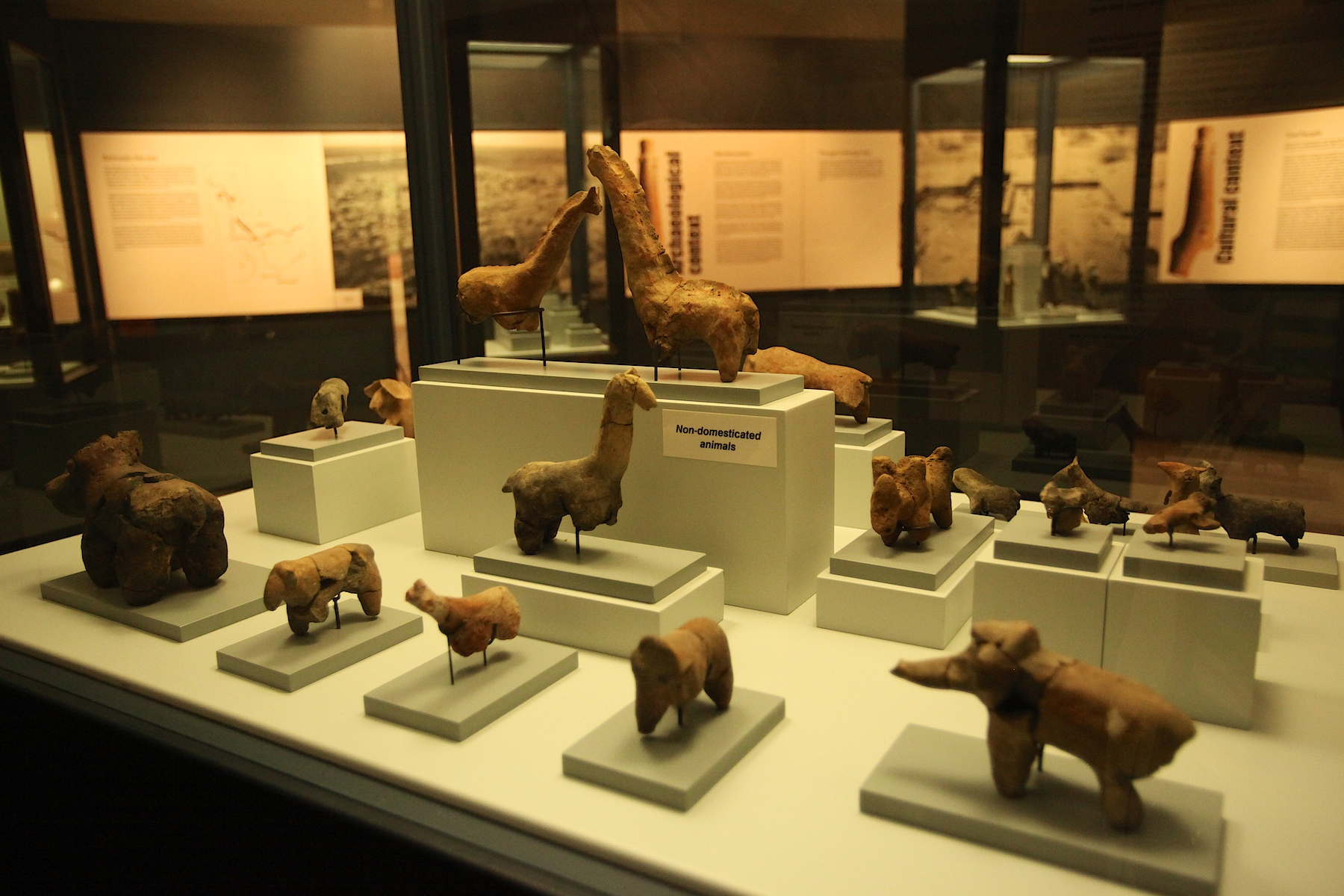
Archaeological non-domesticated animal figurines

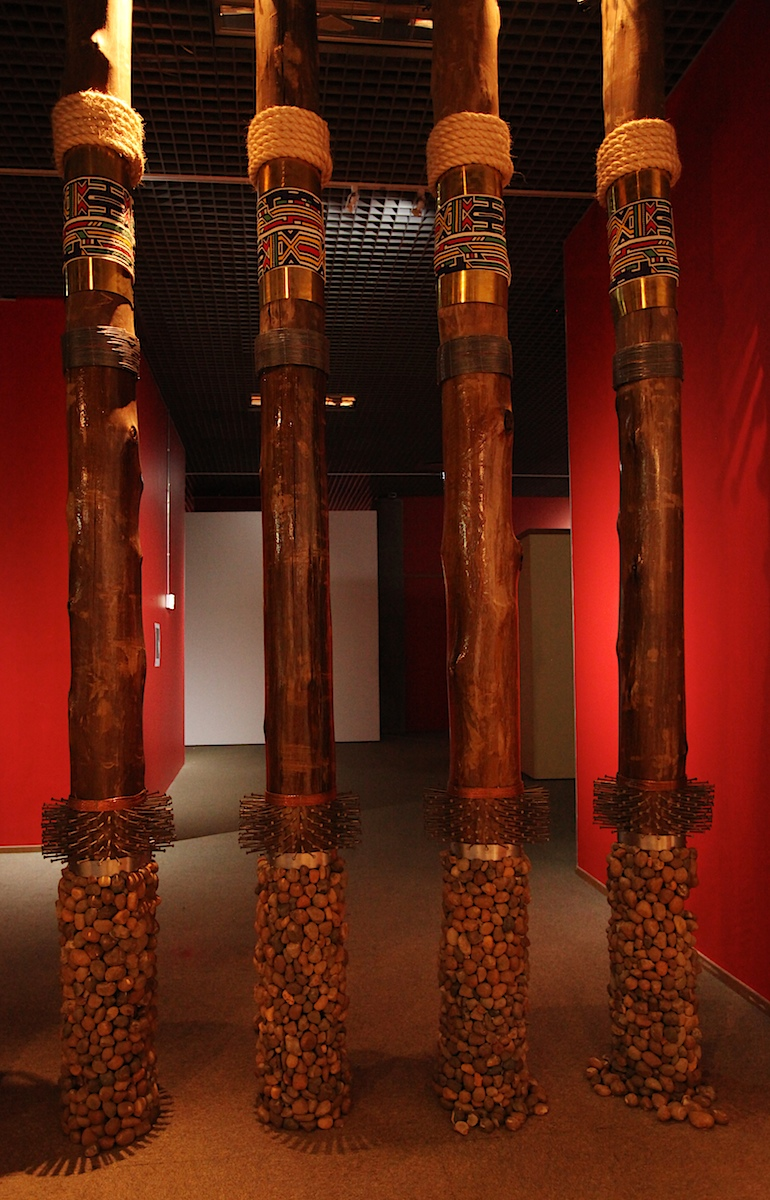
Sticks

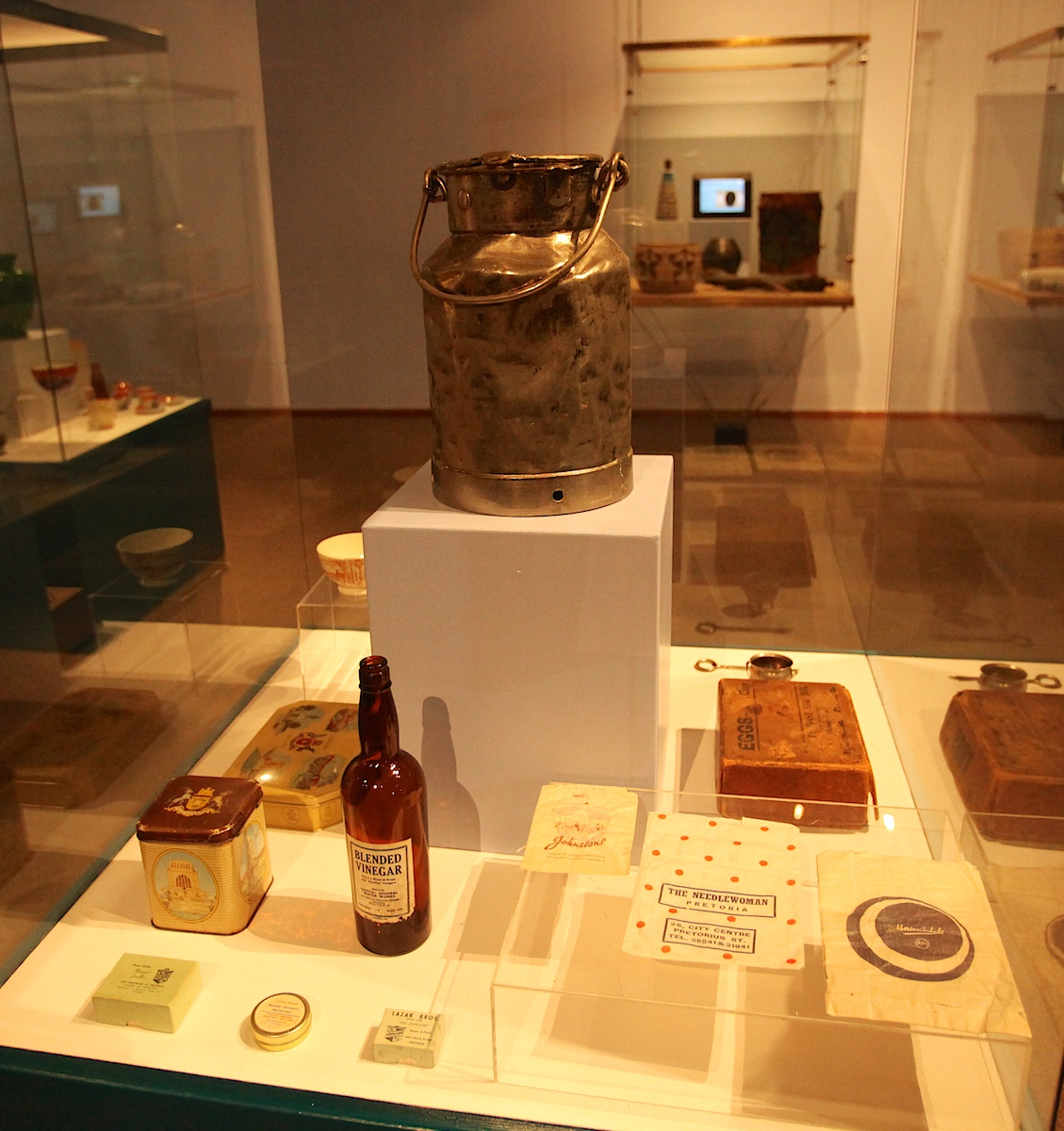
Blended Vinegar bottle, book The Needlewoman Pretoria, egg box

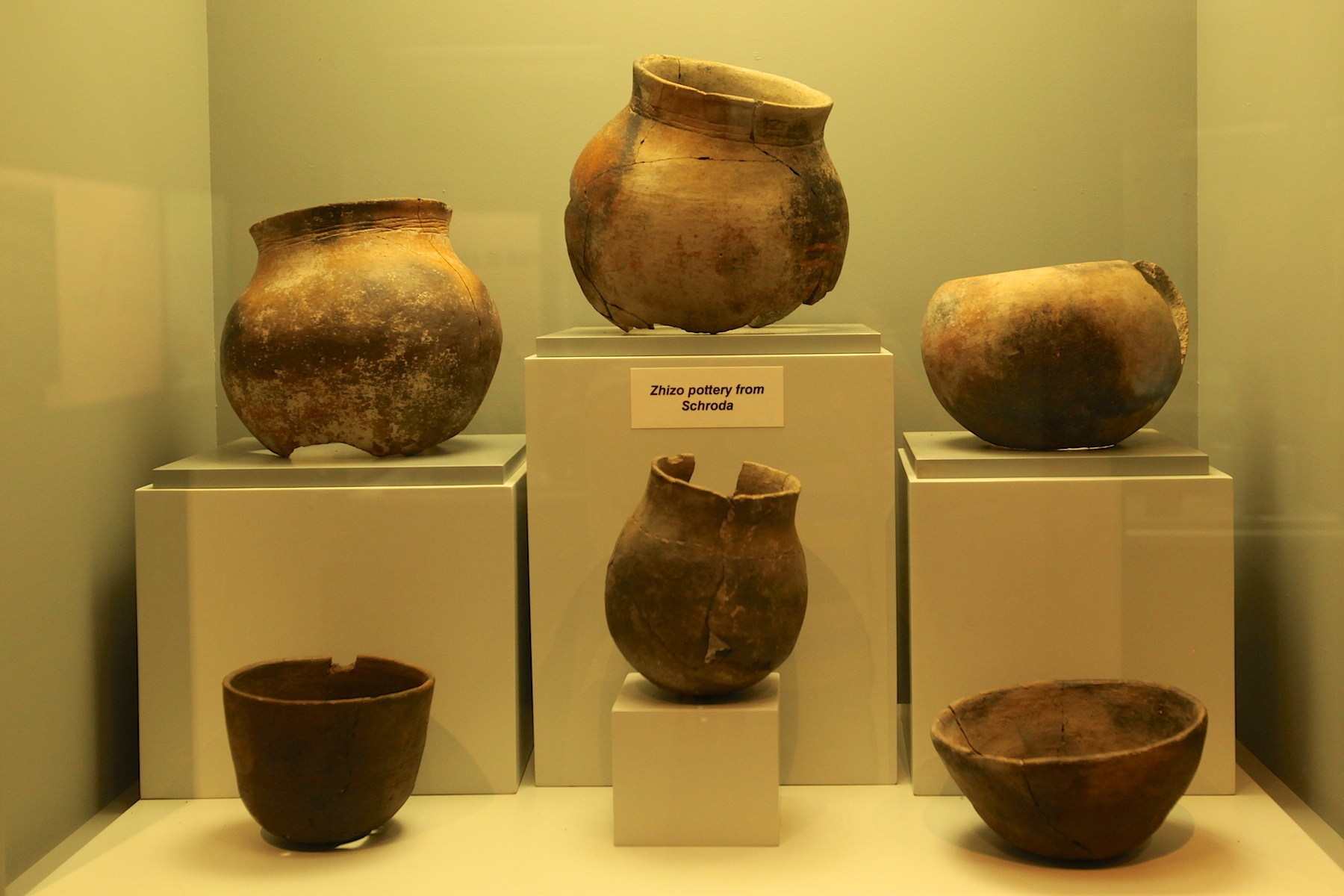
Zhizo pottery from Schroda

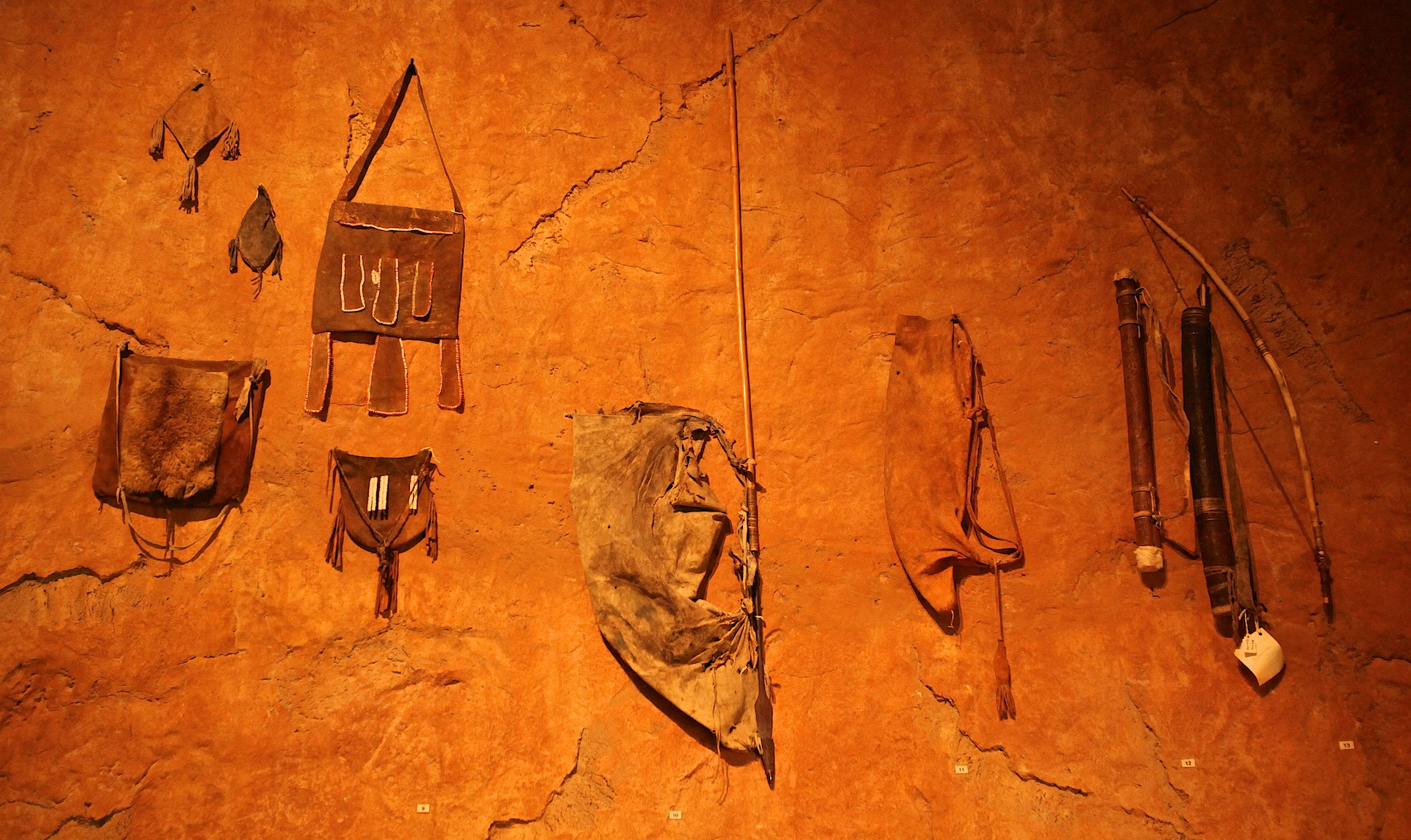
San people artefacts

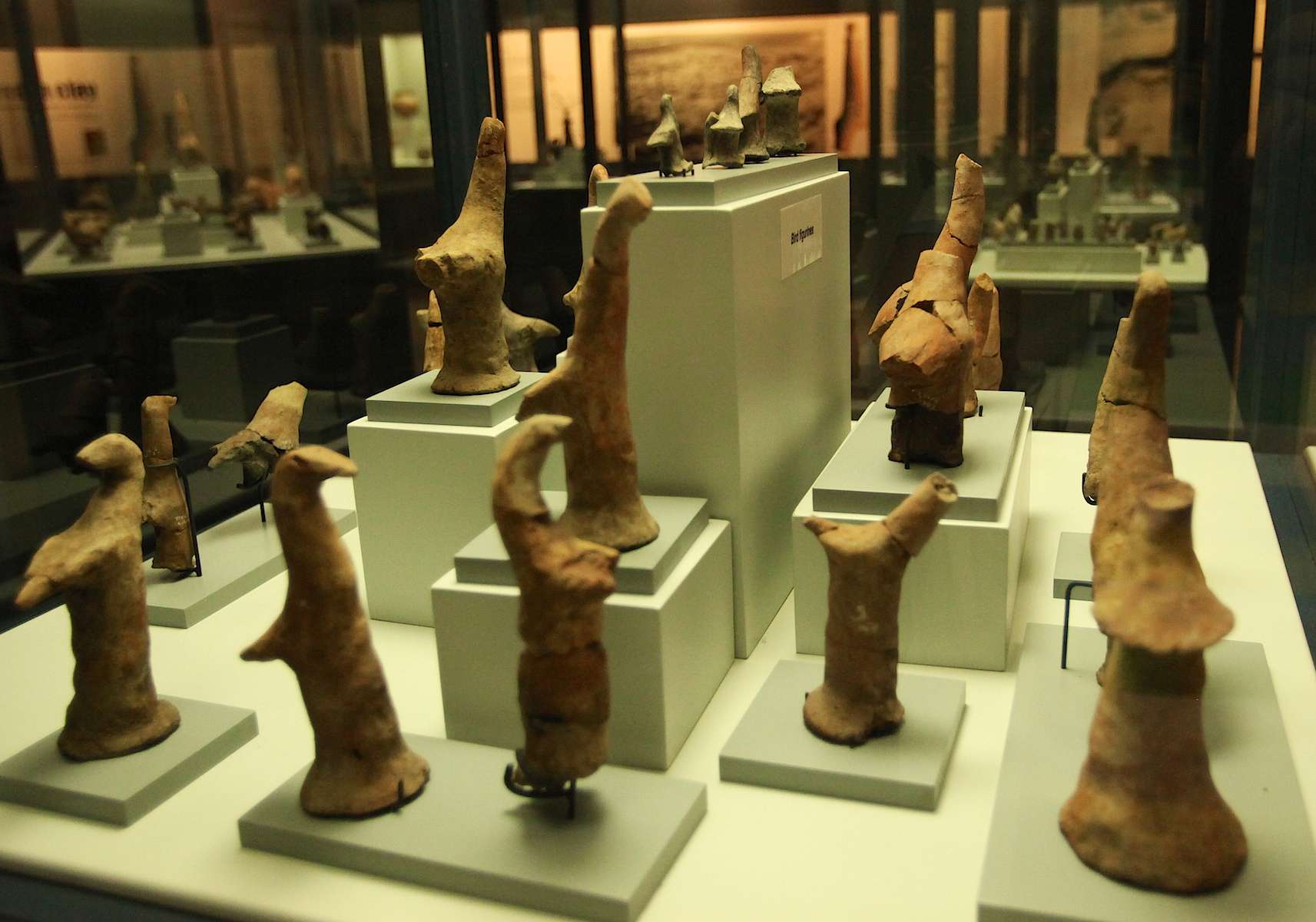
Bird figurines

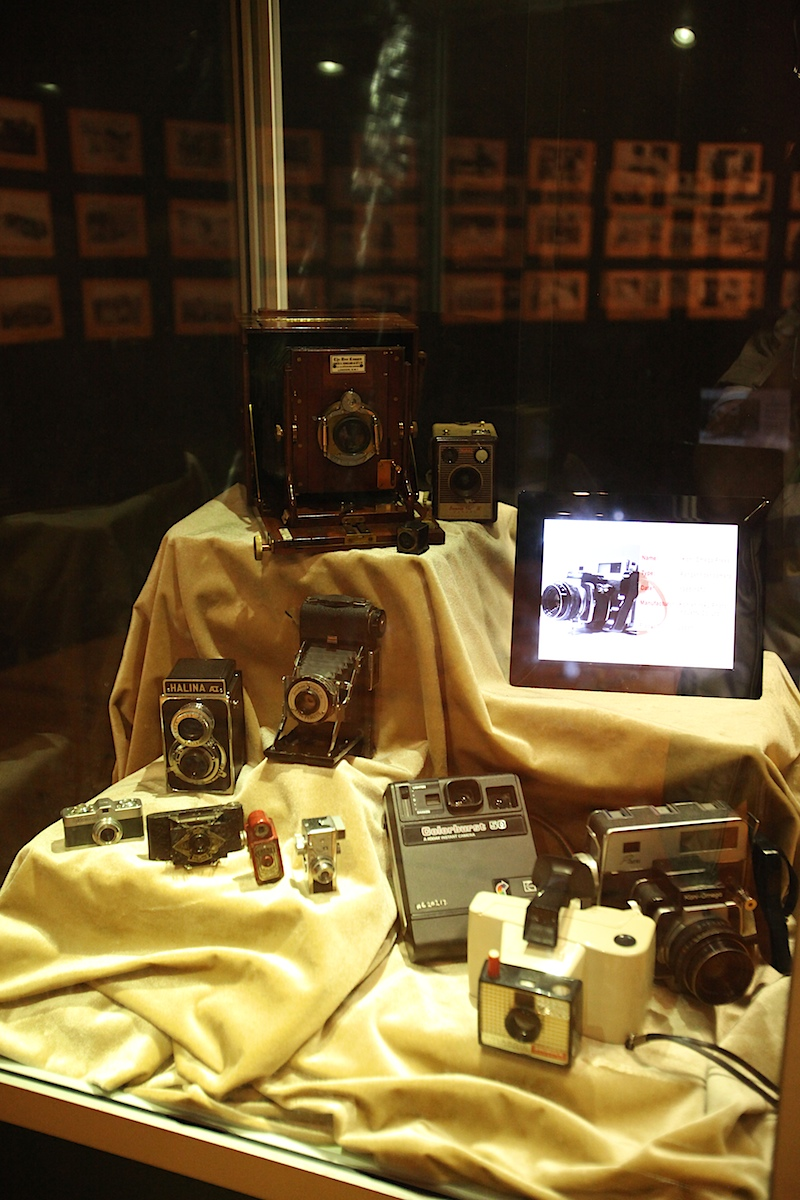
Historical cameras

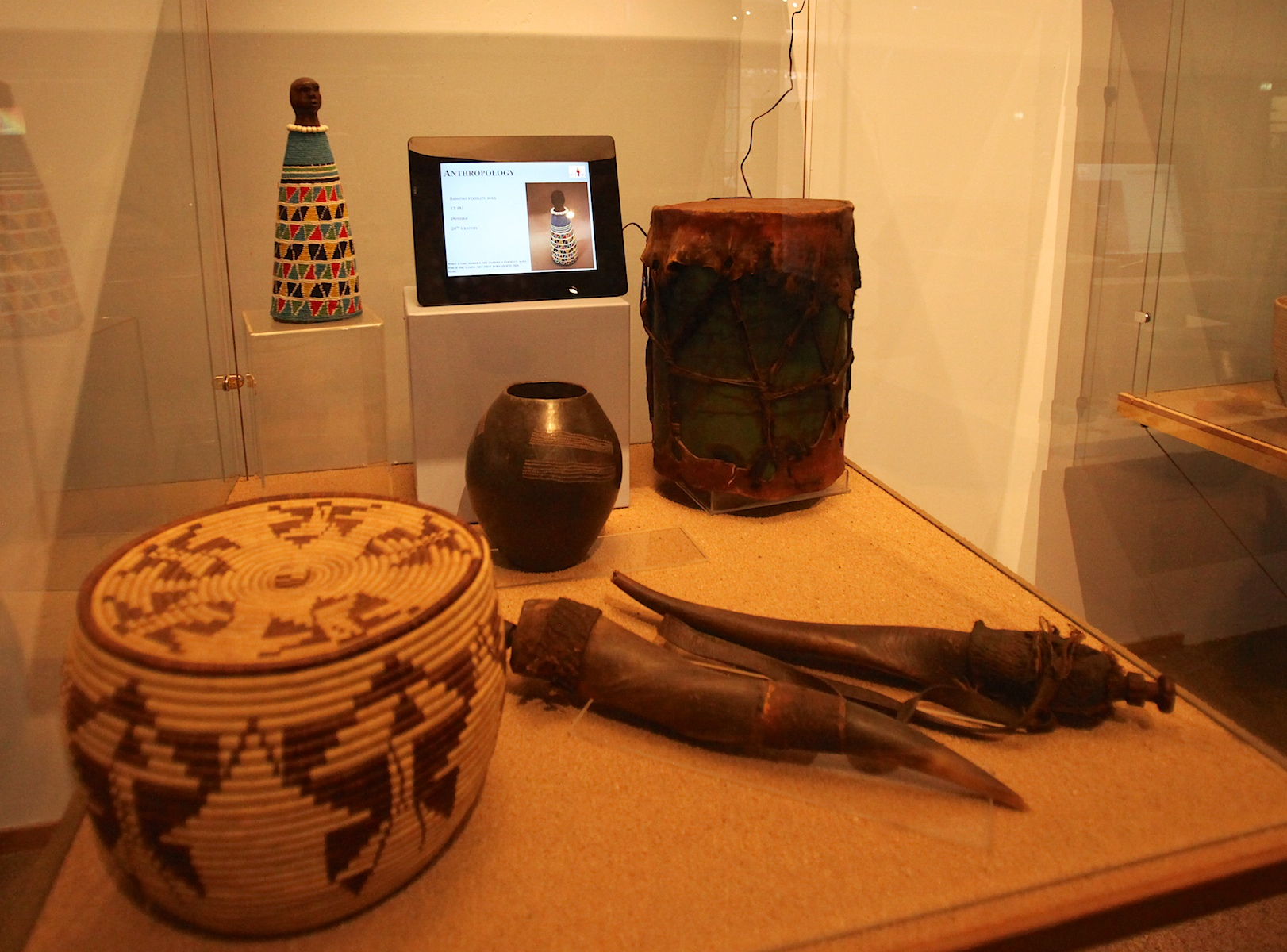
Anthropological artefacts: wicker basket, 20th century Basotho fertility doll, vase, drum

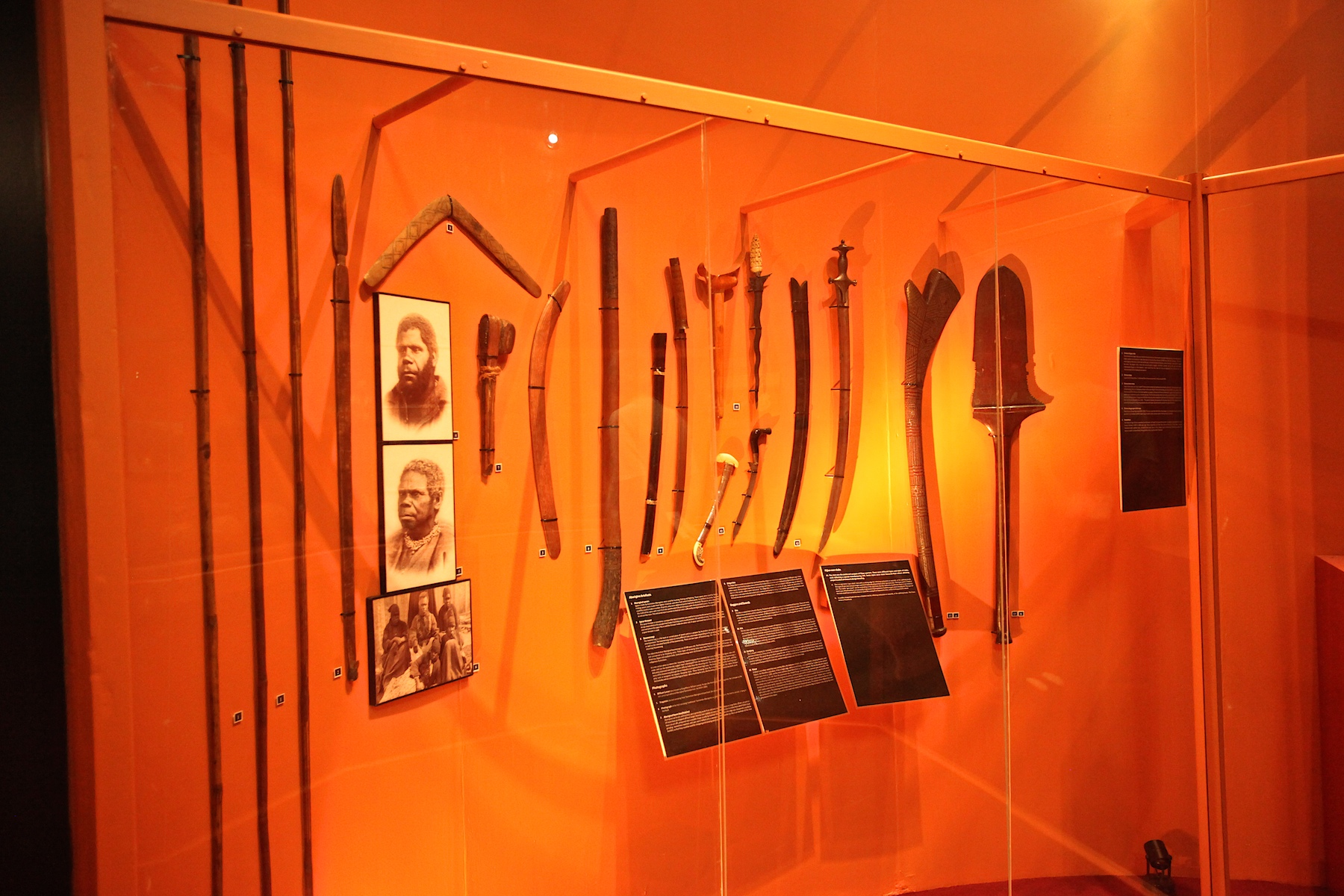
San people artefacts

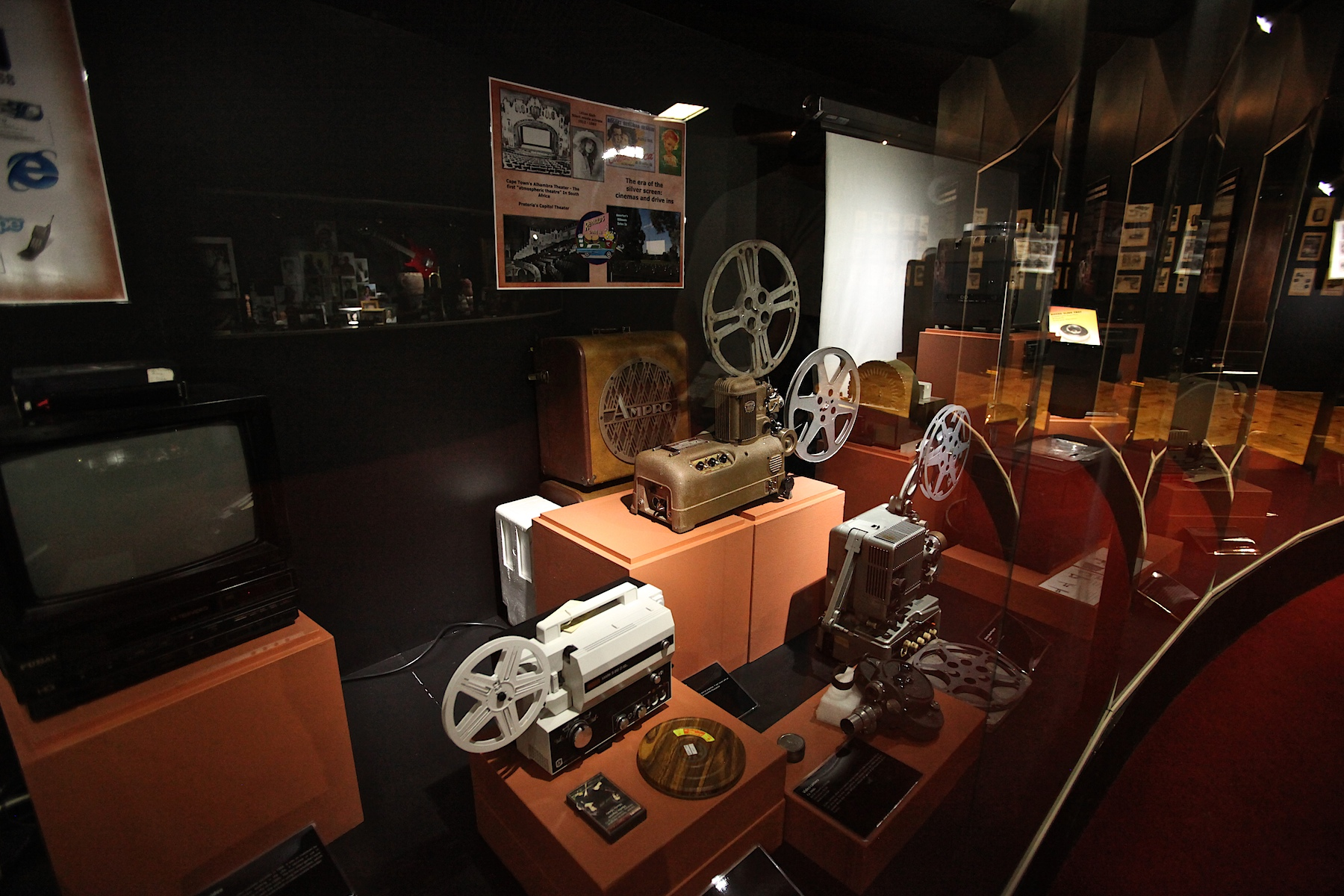
Film projectors

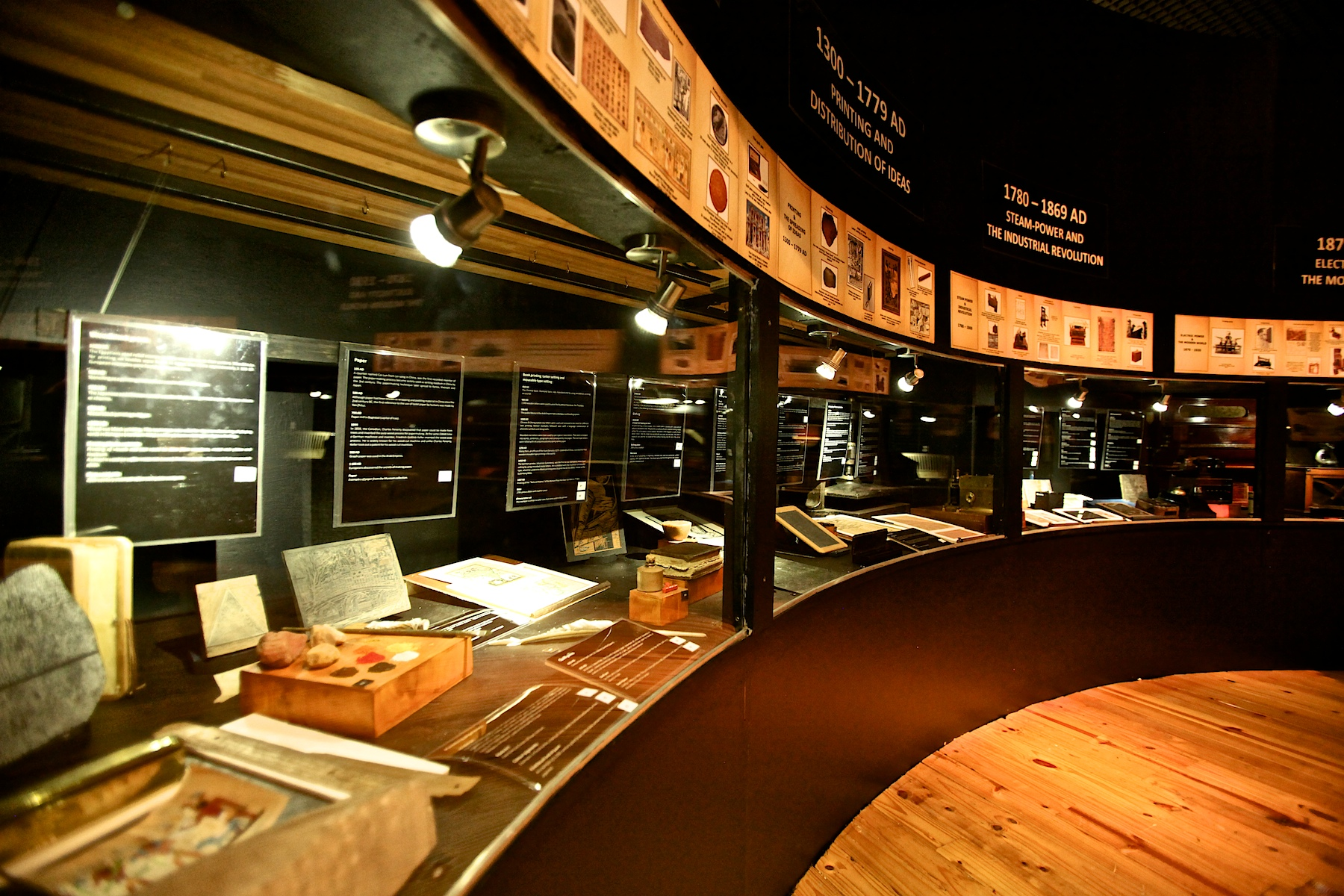

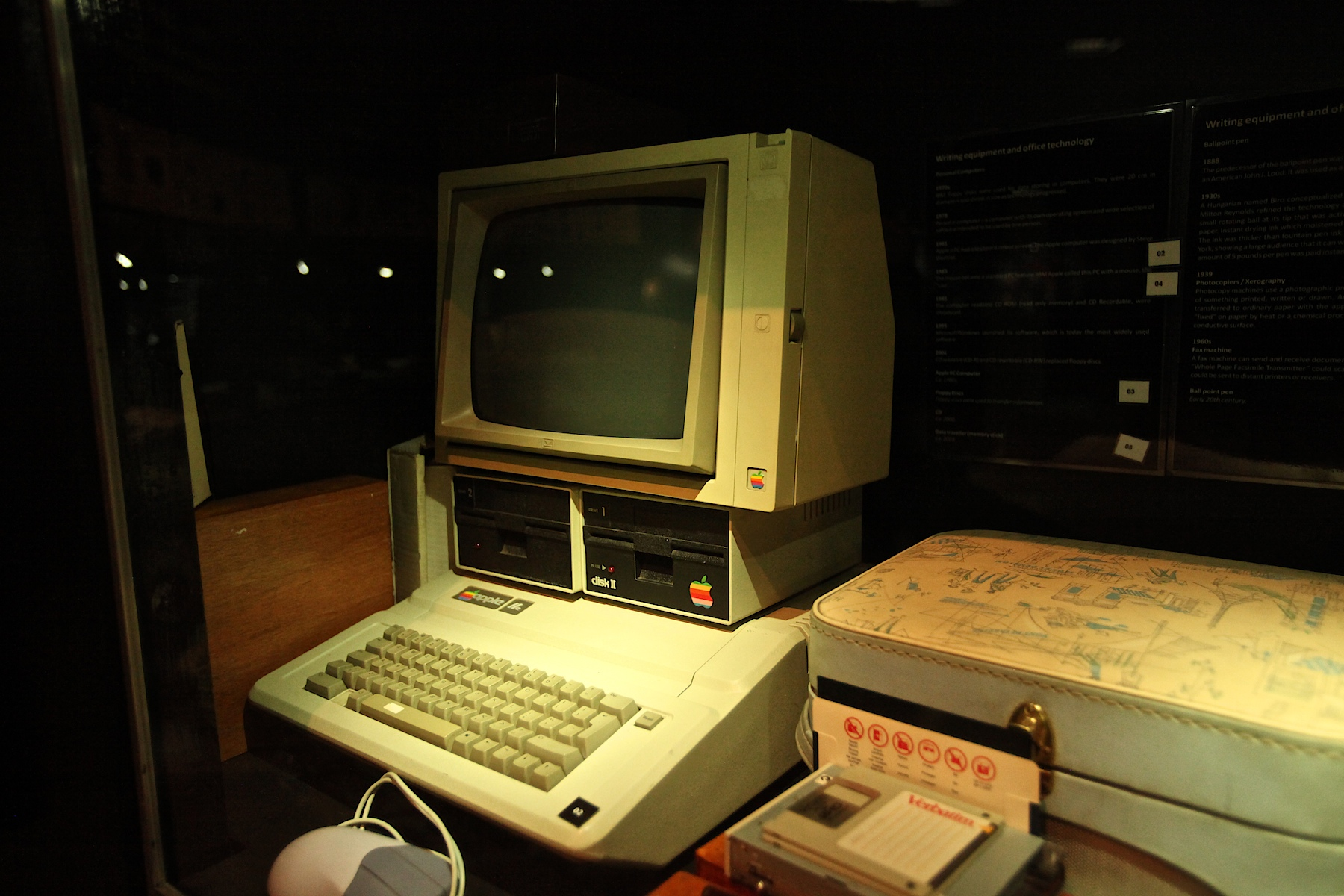
1977 Apple II computer
