= Pretoria Reformed Church (GKSA) =

Church in Pretoria, South Africa

Coordinates: 25°45′4″S 28°11′4″E

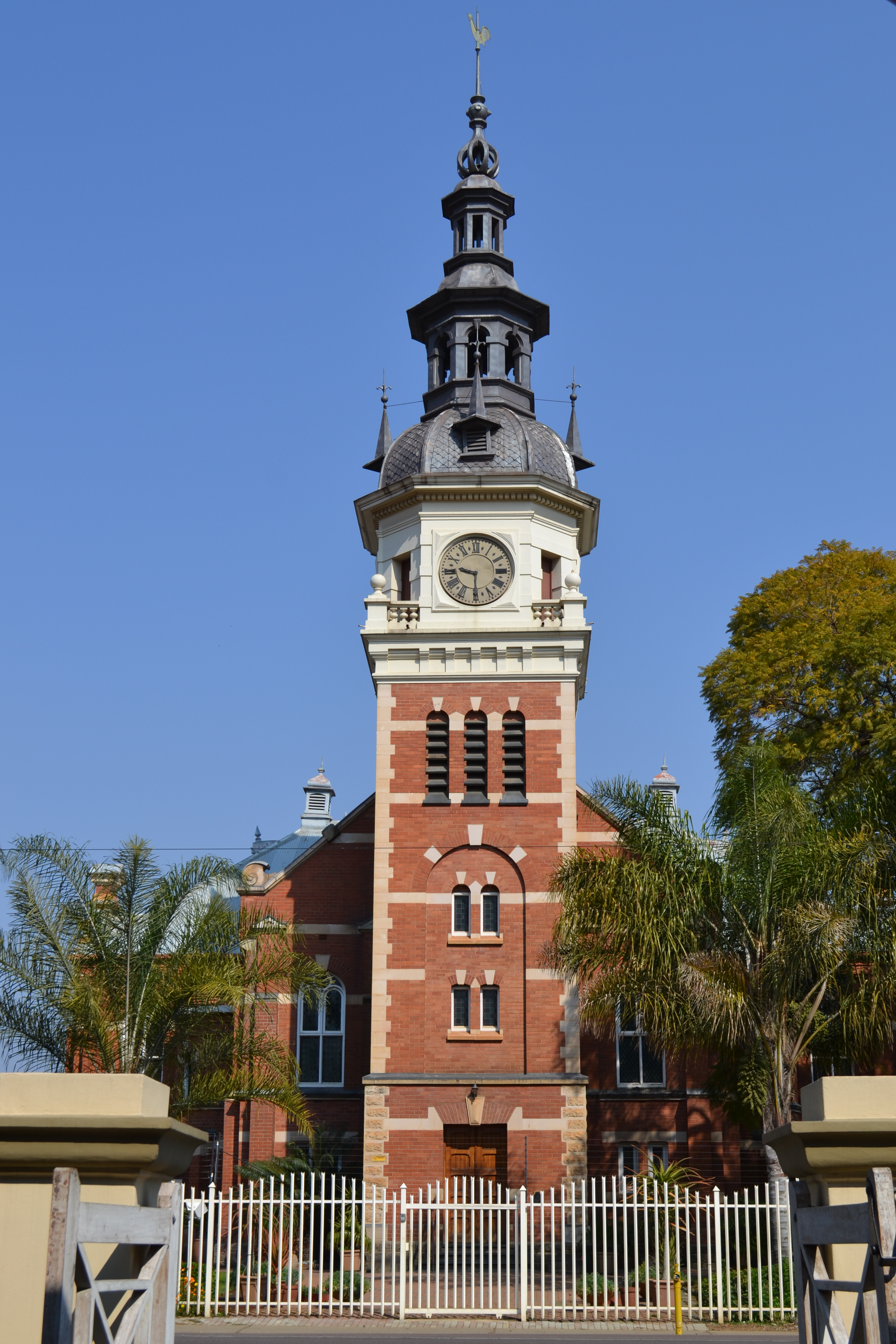
- Pretoria Reformed Church
- Location: Pretoria
- Country: South Africa
- Denomination: Reformed Churches in South Africa

History
- Founded: 1859

Architecture
- Functional status: Church

The Pretoria Reformed Church on the corner of Church and Potgieter Streets in Pretoria opposite the Kruger House is a historic Reformed church that was built during the rule of the South African Republic. The then president of the ZAR, Paul Kruger, laid the cornerstone on 10 October 1896, his birthday. The building was designed by Klaas van Rijsse and was built by Daanen and Dorlas.

== Background ==
Due to the rapid increase in the population of the village of Pretoria in the 1890s, the problem of the church being too small came to the attention of the church council. A fund was established for the construction of a new church, but due to various setbacks it took until 1896 before the first stone for the new building could be laid. This happened by Paul Kruger, the president of the South African Republic, on his 71st birthday.

The architect, Klaas van Rijsse, was an elder of the congregation and originally came from the Netherlands. As a government engineer and architect, Van Rijsse was responsible for the construction of a large number of government buildings and mansions. However, church architecture was Van Rijsse's favorite. The construction was undertaken by the firm of Daanen and Dorlas and the construction costs amounted to £13,000, of which the president himself contributed £2,250. The new Reformed church was taken into use after the president opened the doors on Christmas Day 1897. The new building had room for nine hundred churchgoers and the church has never been too small again. The church, built in the style of the Dutch neo-Renaissance, later also influenced the construction of other churches. The church, built of red brick, has a ground plan of a Greek cross with a high interior space without nave.

In 1983, the church became a national monument, a culmination of the efforts of Reverend MJ Booyens.

== Sources ==
- (in Afrikaans) Engelbrecht, prof. dr. S.P. 1953, Geskiedenis van die Nederduitsch Hervormde Kerke van Afrika. Kaapstad, Pretoria: H.A.U.M.–J.H. de Bussy.
- (in Afrikaans) Harris, C.T., Noëth, J.G., Sarkady, N.G., Schutte, F.M. en Van Tonder, J.M. 2010. Van seringboom tot kerkgebou: die argitektoniese erfenis van die Gereformeerde Kerke. Potchefstroom: Administratiewe Buro.
- (in English) Musiker, R. en N. in Potgieter, D.J. 1974. Standard Encyclopaedia of Southern Africa, volume 10. Cape Town: Nasionale Opvoedkundige Uitgewery Ltd.
- (in English) Picton-Seymour, Désirée. 1989. Historical buildings in South Africa. Cape Town: Struikhof Publishers.
- (in Afrikaans) Spoelstra, dr. Bouke in De Kock, W.J. 1968. Suid-Afrikaanse Biografiese Woordeboek, deel I. Kaapstad: Nasionale Boekhandel Beperk.
- (in Afrikaans) Vogel, Willem (red.). 2014. Die Almanak van die Gereformeerde Kerke in Suid-Afrika vir die jaar 2015. Potchefstroom: Administratiewe Buro.
