= Pionier Museum =

Museum in South Africa

Pioneer Open-air Museum
- "Pionier Opelug Museum"
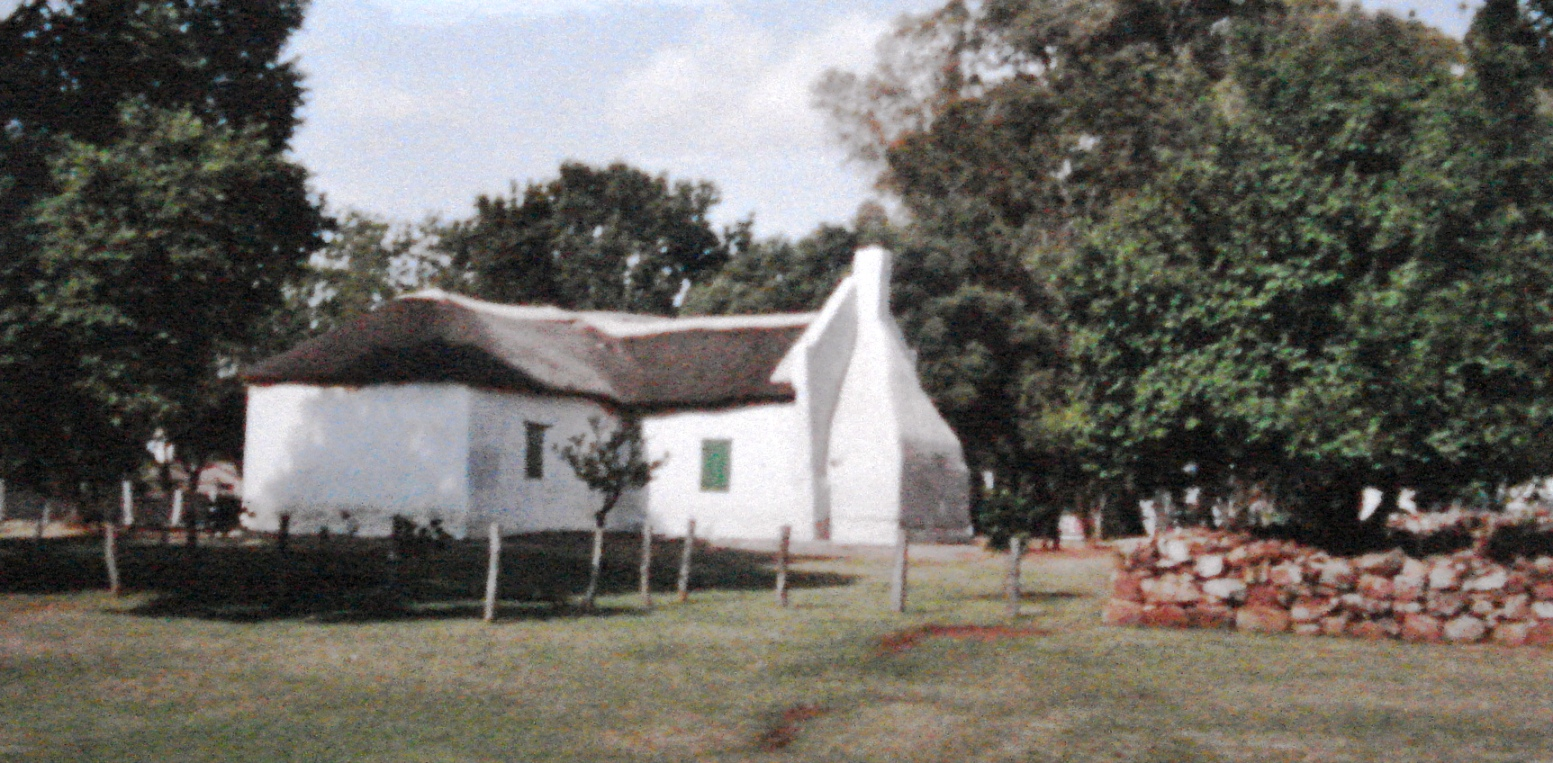
- The 1848 House
- Established: 1975
- Location: Pretoria, Gauteng, South Africa
- Coordinates: 25.734715°S 28.308467°E
- Type: Cultural history
- Website: www.ditsong.org.za/pioneer.htm, http://pioniersmuseum.co.za/

Ditsong Museums of South Africa network
- Natural History; Military History; Cultural History; Agricultural History; Pionier Museum; Sammy Marks Museum; Tswaing Meteorite Crater; Kruger Museum

Pionier Opelug Museum (Afrikaans for the Pioneer Open-air Museum) is a cultural and "living" museum in the eastern suburbs of Pretoria that reflects the lifestyle of early pioneers or "Voortrekkers" of the early 19th century. It is housed in the oldest building in Pretoria, the 1848 House, and the museum is operated by Ditsong Museums of South Africa.

== Museum ==
The museum is a "living museum" so in other words the guides and the visitors are meant to experience the museum as if they lived in the early 19th century and the guides are clad in period dress. Activities include traditional bread making and butter churning and presentations of "Voorlaaier", Afrikaans for "Front-loading" musket, firing and reloading. The main tour of the museum follows the history of the 1848 House and the people who inhabited the original farm called "Hartebeestpoort". The surrounding gardens are stocked with a traditional herb and vegetable garden where one can learn about Voortrekker "Boereraat" or "home-remedies", an orchard, a furnished period wagon house and a vineyard.

=== Events ===
- A New Year's Festival is held on 1 January every year in the museum complex.
- There is also a farmers' market held at the museum every Saturday from 5h30 to 9h30 called the Pretoria Boeremark.

== 1848 House ==
The fittingly named 1848 House is the main building of the complex and was built in 1848 by early Voortrekker pioneers using traditional methods, it is the oldest man made structure still standing in the city of Pretoria. According to the website the house's specifications are: "The house was built of clay and local materials, with a thatched roof and earthen floors, and is furnished in the traditional 19th century rural style."

== History ==
The Cape Colony farmer David Botha, was the first to settle on the farm Hartebeespoort in 1846 and two years later he built the current main house. The property served the purpose of halfway station for many years with several coach-houses and stables catering to the needs of travelers. In 1961 the property was donated to the Municipality of Silverton and in 1975 it was made into a museum and named the "Pionier Museum" or "Pioneer Museum".
