= R553 (South Africa) =

Regional Route in Gauteng, South Africa

Regional route R553

Route information
- Maintained by GDRT
- Length: 62 km (39 mi)

Major junctions
- North end: M1 in Ormonde, Johannesburg
- N1 / N12 in Eldorado Park, Soweto; N12 in Eldorado Park, Soweto; R554 east of Lenasia; R558 / R557 in Lenasia South; R551 in Orange Farm; R28 in Evaton; R28 / R54 in Sebokeng; R57 in Vanderbijlpark
- South end: R42 in Vanderbijlpark

Location
- Country: South Africa
- Major cities: Johannesburg, Soweto, Lenasia, Orange Farm, Sebokeng, Vanderbijlpark

Highway system
- Numbered routes of South Africa
← R552	→ R554

The R553 is a Regional Route in Gauteng, South Africa that connects Johannesburg with Vanderbijlpark via Eldorado Park, Ennerdale, Evaton and Sebokeng. It is known as the Golden Highway for much of its length.

== Route ==
Its northern terminus is an interchange with the M1 highway (De Villiers Graaff Motorway) in Ormonde, Johannesburg South (southbound only). It heads south-west as the Golden Highway and forms an intersection with the M68 road (Columbine Avenue) in Southgate, west of Southgate Shopping Centre and east of Soweto, before meeting the western terminus of the M38 road.

Continuing south-west, it forms an interchange with the N1 highway (which is co-signed with the N12). The R553 is parallel to the N1 from here for most of its length. From there, it passes through Eldorado Park (the south-eastern corner of Soweto) in a south-westerly direction before it forms another interchange with the N12 national route (which is now its own highway).

From the N12 interchange, it exits Johannesburg to the south-south-west. It passes through the Olifantsvlei Nature Reserve and forms an intersection with the R554 road just east of Lenasia before reaching Lenasia South and bypassing Ennerdale.

East of Ennerdale, it intersects with the R558 (which provides access to Kanana Park across the nearby N1 highway) before crossing back to the eastern side of the parallel N1 highway next to the N1's Grasmere Toll Plaza.

Next, it meets the western terminus of the R557 just after the N1 overbridge and passes in-between Drieziek and Orange Farm (where it meets the western terminus of the R551) before exiting the City of Johannesburg Metropolitan Municipality and entering Evaton and Sebokeng. At Evaton, it is joined by the R28 and they are one road southwards through western Sebokeng for 9 kilometres.

At the intersection with the R54 road, the R28 stops cosigning with the R553 southwards and begins cosigning with the R54 eastwards towards Vereeniging, leaving the R553 as the road southwards. Next, the R553 reaches an intersection with the R57 (which takes over the name Golden Highway) at the northern edge of Vanderbijlpark, with the R57 providing access to Vanderbijlpark Central and Sasolburg in the south-east.

The R553 continues south-west from this intersection for 8 kilometres as Fred Dorste Road to end at a t-junction with the R42 road west of Vanderbijlpark. (The R42 connects westwards to Parys)
