= R82 (South Africa) =

Road in South Africa

Provincial route R82

Route information
- Maintained by GDRT and FSDPRT
- Length: 183 km (114 mi)

Major junctions
- North end: M1 / M68 in Johannesburg
- R54 / R59 in Vereeniging; R28 in Vereeniging; R42 in Vereeniging; R57 near Sasolburg
- South end: R34 near Kroonstad

Location
- Country: South Africa
- Major cities: Johannesburg, Vereeniging, Sasolburg, Kroonstad

Highway system
- Numbered routes of South Africa
← R81	→ R101

The R82 is a provincial route in South Africa that connects Johannesburg with Kroonstad via Vereeniging and Sasolburg. It starts just south of the M1 Johannesburg Municipal Highway's interchange with the N12 Southern Bypass (Uncle Charlie's Interchange), going south, meeting the R59, R54, R42 & R28 routes at Vereeniging before crossing the Vaal River into the Free State & proceeding to Kroonstad. It is an alternative, but longer route to the N1 national route between Johannesburg & Kroonstad.

== Route ==
Detailed Route

The R82 is an alternative route to the N1 highway from Johannesburg to Kroonstad, with the N1 highway being a shorter and more direct route by about 20 kilometres. Whereas the N1 has tollgates, the R82 is toll-free.

=== Gauteng ===
The R82 road begins in the southern suburbs of Johannesburg, at the southern end of the M1 Johannesburg Municipal Highway. It comes from Johannesburg Central in the north as the M1 and changes to the R82 designation just after meeting the N12 highway (Johannesburg Southern Bypass) at the Uncle Charlie's Interchange in Johannesburg South, near the Southgate suburb. At this interchange, only the N12 and the M1 have access to each other (N12 east to M1 north and M1 south to N12 west, with no direct access between the N12 and the R82).

At the next off-ramp with Columbine Avenue (M68) by Southgate Shopping Centre, the route stops being a highway and continues southwards as Vereeniging Road (2 lanes in each direction). It continues for 6 kilometres, bypassing Meredale, to meet the R554 route (Swartkoppies Road) from Alberton just south-west of Kibler Park and they are cosigned southwards for 800 metres up to the western terminus of the R550 route from Nigel (at a four-way-junction), where the R554 route becomes the road westwards towards Lenasia.

The R82 continues south for 11 kilometres, crossing into the Midvaal Local Municipality, to reach the town of Walkerville, where it meets the R557 route from Meyerton and they are cosigned for 3 kilometres southwards before the R557 route becomes the road westwards towards Kanana Park. The R82 continues for 22 kilometres southwards, through De Deur (where it meets the R551 route), entering the Emfuleni Local Municipality, to enter Vereeniging as Old Johannesburg Road, bypassing the suburb of Roshnee.

At the four-way-junction with the R54 route (Houtkop Road) near the Duncanville suburb, under the passing R59 Sybrand van Niekerk Freeway, the R82 becomes Voortrekker Street and is the main road southwards through Vereeniging Central. At Beaconsfield Avenue in Vereeniging Central, the R82 meets the south-eastern terminus of the R28 route from Sebokeng. At the 3rd junction afterwards (with Victoria Avenue), the R82 meets the R42 route from Vanderbijlpark and they become cosigned on the road eastwards from this junction. At the 2nd junction (with Mario Milani Drive), just after passing under the Vereeniging Railway, the R42 becomes the road northwards towards Three Rivers, leaving the R82 as the road eastwards. Right after this junction, the R82 crosses the Vaal River into the Free State.

=== Free State ===
The R82 crosses the Vaal River into the Metsimaholo Local Municipality as Problem Road. Right after crossing the Vaal River, the road turns southwards and continues for seven kilometres to Viljoensdrif, where it meets Ascot-On-Vaal Road from Vanderbijlpark, Gauteng and the R716 route to Deneysville (on the western banks of the Vaal Dam).

The R82 continues southwards for twelve kilometres to the south-eastern area of Sasolburg (Coalbrook; east of the Zamdela constituency), where it meets the R57 route between Vanderbijlpark and Heilbron and a road linking eastwards to Deneysville (Vaal Dam). After the Sasolburg area, the R82 crosses into the Ngwathe Local Municipality and continues south-west for fifty-eight kilometres, intersecting with the R723 route (co-signed for 2.7 kilometers), bypassing the town of Koppies, to reach an intersection with the R720 route.

The R82 and the R720 are co-signed south-east for four kilometres, crossing the Renoster River, before the R82 becomes its own road south-west. The R82 travels for fifty-two kilometres, through Heuningspruit, to end at an intersection with the R34 route north-east of Kroonstad (2 kilometres east of the R34's interchange with the N1 national route) in the Moqhaka Local Municipality.
