= R557 (South Africa) =

Regional route in South Africa

Regional route R557

Route information
- Maintained by GDRT
- Length: 43.2 km (26.8 mi)

Major junctions
- West end: R553 near Ennerdale
- R558 near Ennerdale; R82 near Walkerville; R59 in Daleside; R551 near Suikerbosrand Nature Reserve
- East end: R42 near Suikerbosrand Nature Reserve

Location
- Country: South Africa

Highway system
- Numbered routes of South Africa
← R556	→ R558

The R557 is a Regional Route in Gauteng, South Africa that connects Ennerdale with the Suikerbosrand Nature Reserve via Kanana Park and Randvaal.

== Route ==
The R557 begins at a junction with the R553 (Golden Highway) in Ennerdale South. The road heads north-east to meet the southern terminus of the R558 before turning to the east-south-east in Kanana Park and it proceeds to reach a T-junction with the R82. It joins the R82 northwards for two kilometres before becoming its own road eastwards in the southern part of Walkerville. The R557 continues east-south-east to cross the R59 highway (Sybrand van Niekerk Freeway) in Randvaal (Daleside). It flies over the M61 metropolitan route before turning south as Kroonarend Road and east as Karee Road in Daleside. It crosses the Klip River and continues south-east, passing by the south-western corner of the Suikerbosrand Nature Reserve, crossing the R551, to end at a junction with the R42 between Vereeniging to the south-west and Heidelberg to the north-east.
