= R59 (South Africa) =

Road in South Africa

Provincial route R59

Route information
- Maintained by FSDPRT and GDRT
- Length: 421 km (262 mi)

Major junctions
- Southwest end: R64 near Dealesville
- R34 in Hoopstad; R30 in Bothaville; R76 in Viljoenskroon; R53 in Parys; R42 near Parys; N1 near Parys; R57 in Sasolburg; R42 in Vereeniging; R28 in Vereeniging; R54 / R82 in Vereeniging; N12 in Alberton
- Northeast end: M38 in Tulisa Park

Location
- Country: South Africa
- Major cities: Hertzogville, Hoopstad, Bothaville, Viljoenskroon, Vredefort, Parys, Sasolburg, Vereeniging, Meyerton, Alberton

Highway system
- Numbered routes of South Africa
← R58	→ R60

The R59 is a provincial route in South Africa that connects Hertzogville with Alberton (south-east of Johannesburg) via Bothaville, Parys and Vereeniging. The R59 is a freeway from the R57 Junction in Sasolburg until the N12 Reading Interchange in Alberton, signposted as the Sybrand van Niekerk Freeway.

== Route ==
Detailed Route

=== Free State ===
The R59 begins at a t-junction with the R64 about 18 kilometres west of Dealesville. It heads north for 61 kilometres to the town of Hertzogville, where it meets the R708 at a t-junction next to the Palmietpan and they become co-signed northwards. North of the town, the R59 becomes its own road north-east, heading for 50 kilometres to Hoopstad where on the southerly outskirts, before the Vet River, it meets the northern terminus of the R700 at a t-junction and turns northwards.

It crosses the Vet River into Hoopstad, where it meets and becomes cosigned with the R34. They loop to the north of the town and turn east before the R59 becomes its own road just north of the Tikwana suburb to resume its journey north-east, heading for 31 kilometres to reach a junction with the R505. The route continues north-east for 55 kilometres, past a place named Misgunst, to reach a t-junction with the R30 and co-sign with it northwards, crossing the Vals River into the town centre of Bothaville. In Bothaville central, the R727 t-junctions the R30/R59 co-signage. At a four-way intersection north of Bothaville, as the R504 is the road westwards and the R30 continues northwards, the R59 becomes the road to the east.

The R59 continues in a north-easterly direction for 40 kilometres to bypass Viljoenskroon to the north, where it meets the R76 at a 4-way-junction. It continues north-east from Viljoenskroon for 11 kilometres to meet the southern terminus of the R501 and cross the Renoster River before heading another 40 kilometres to Vredefort.

After bypassing Vredefort to the west, it meets the northern terminus of the R721 north of the town. It continues north-east for 12 kilometres to Parys, where it becomes the main road through the town (Bree Street) and meets the southern terminus of the R53 and R500 routes from the North West Province (which the nearby, parallel Vaal River forms the border with). It is not one direct road through Parys (makes a right turn to become Water Street and a left turn to become Loop Street).

From Parys, the route continues north-east for 19 kilometres to meet the south-western terminus of the R42 road extension (Boundary Road) just before meeting the N1 Kroonvaal Toll Route and crossing over it just north of the N1's Vaal Toll Plaza.

It proceeds east-north-east for 20 kilometres, still following the Vaal River, to enter Sasolburg's northern suburbs, where it forms a large interchange with the R57 Golden Highway. It crosses over the R57 and continues north-east to meet Ascot-on-Vaal Road (R716) on the outskirts of Sasolburg (just west of Viljoensdrif) before crossing the Vaal River into Gauteng province east of Vanderbijlpark as the Sybrand van Niekerk Freeway. It is a freeway for its remainder.

=== Gauteng ===
After crossing the Vaal, it interchanges with and crosses the R42 for the second time east of Sharpeville, Vanderbijlpark and south-west of Vereeniging Central (west southbound and east northbound off-ramps only), before crossing the R28 west of Vereeniging Central. It continues north and meets the R54 to the Three Rivers suburb (R59 North off-ramp only) and the R82 to Vereeniging Central (R59 South off-ramp only) at an interchange close to Duncanville. It then meets the M61 as it continues north-east, passing to the west of Meyerton, where it intersects with the R551.

It continues north-east, passes Henley on Klip and intersects with the R557 near Randvaal. It continues north, passing to the west of Garthdale, where it crosses the R550 road and then the Klip River. Its next interchange is with the M7 (Klip River Drive) outside Brackendown and Thokoza. It continues into Brackenhurst, a suburb of Alberton, where it meets the R554 road (Swartkoppies Road; which provides access to the Alberton CBD) before meeting Michelle Avenue (M95) in Meyersdal. After a short distance, it meets the N12 highway (Johannesburg Southern Bypass) at the Reading Interchange and then proceeds to end at a T-junction with the M38 road in Tulisa Park, Johannesburg South.
