= Vaal Mall =

- Interactive map of the Vaal Mall area

General information
- Status: Completed
- Type: Shopping Mall
- Architectural style: Winding River
- Location: Vanderbijlpark, Gauteng, Cnr. Rossini Boulevard & Barrage Rd, Vanderbijlpark S. W. 2, Vanderbijlpark, 1911, South Africa, Vanderbijlpark (Emfuleni Local Municipality), South Africa
- Coordinates: 26.709417°S 27.822426°E
- Opened: 2006
- Owner: Growth Point

Technical details
- Floor count: 2 (ground level, first level)

Website
- http://www.vaalmall.co.za/

The Vaal Mall is a large shopping centre in Vanderbijlpark, Gauteng, South Africa. It is the largest shopping centre in the region and serves patrons from Vanderbijlpark, Vereeniging, Sasolburg, Sebokeng, Bophelong and Parys.

The entire centre is built on one level with an extra 15 000sqm level added in (2014-2016) which contains a Ster-Kinekor with 7 movie cinemas, with one main passageway in the form of a winding river. Elements of the river theme can be found throughout the centre.
