= M61 (Johannesburg) =

Metropolitan route in Greater Johannesburg, South Africa

Metropolitan route M61

Route information
- Maintained by Johannesburg Roads Agency and Gauteng Department of Roads and Transport
- Length: 49 km (30 mi)

Major junctions
- South end: R54 in Vereeniging
- R59 near Redan; R551 / R59 at Meyerton; R557 at Randvaal; R550 at Garthdale; M7 at Alberton M82 at Alberton
- North end: R554 / R103 in Alberton

Location
- Country: South Africa

Highway system
- Numbered routes of South Africa
← M60	→ M63

The M61 is a long metropolitan route in Gauteng, South Africa. It connects Vereeniging with Alberton via Meyerton. For its entire route, it is an alternative route to the R59 highway.

== Route ==
The M61 begins in Vereeniging, Emfuleni Local Municipality, just north-east of the town centre (just west of the Three Rivers suburb), at a junction with the R54 road. It begins by going north-north-east, following the Klip River, to cross the R59 highway (Sybrand van Niekerk Freeway) and pass by the settlement of Redan.

It continues north-north-east, parallel to the R59 highway, to enter the town of Meyerton in the Midvaal Local Municipality and reach a T-junction with the R551 road. The M61 joins the R551 and they are one road eastwards, crossing the R59 highway again, before the M61 becomes its own road northwards (Morris Road) just before the Meyerton Town Centre.

The M61 continues north-north-east, still following the R59 Highway and the Klip River, bypassing Henley on Klip, meeting the R557 road at Randvaal, to reach Garthdale (Kliprivier), where the M61 reaches a junction with the R550 road. At this junction, the M61 leaves the Midvaal Local Municipality and enters the City of Ekurhuleni Metropolitan Municipality.

From the R550 junction, the M61 goes northwards as Vereeniging Road, immediately crossing the Klip River (no-longer parallel), meeting the M7 road (Kliprivier Road), to bypass the Thokoza and Katlehong townships to the west and enter the town of Alberton. It passes through the Alrode suburb of Alberton to reach its northern terminus at a T-junction with the R554/R103 route co-signage (Heidelberg Road) south-east of the Alberton town centre.
