= R42 (South Africa) =

Road in South Africa

Provincial route R42

Route information
- Maintained by GDRT and MDPWRT
- Length: 175 km (109 mi)

Major junctions
- Southwest end: R59 near Parys
- N1 near Vanderbijlpark; R57 in Vanderbijlpark; R59 in Vereeniging; R82 in Vereeniging; R54 in Vereeniging; R23 in Heidelberg; N3 near Heidelberg; R51 in Nigel; N17 near Springs; R29 near Springs; R50 in Delmas; N12 near Delmas
- Northeast end: R25 near Bronkhorstspruit

Location
- Country: South Africa
- Major cities: Vanderbijlpark, Vereeniging, Heidelberg, Nigel, Delmas, Bronkhorstspruit

Highway system
- Numbered routes of South Africa
← R41	→ R43

The R42 is a provincial route in South Africa that connects Vanderbijlpark with Bronkhorstspruit via Vereeniging, Heidelberg, Nigel and Delmas.

== Route ==
Detailed Route

The R42 begins south of Bronkhorstspruit, City of Tshwane, Gauteng, at an intersection with the R25. It goes southwards, bypassing the Bronkhorstspruit Municipal Nature Reserve and temporarily enters Mpumalanga Province.

=== Mpumalanga ===
In Mpumalanga Province, the R42 continues southwards and crosses the N12 freeway, entering Delmas. The distance from the R25 junction near Bronkhorstspruit to Delmas is 35 km.

In Delmas Central, the R42 joins the R50 road. They are one road south-east for 5 km, crossing the R555 in Delmas Central. South of Delmas, the R42 continues by way of a right turn, continuing south-west.

=== Gauteng ===
The R42 re-enters Gauteng Province and meets the R29 road and N17 national route on their route midway between Springs to the west and Devon to the east. The R42 continues south-west, bypassing the Marievale Bird Sanctuary and Nigel Dam as Nigel-Delmas Road, to Nigel. The journey from Delmas to Nigel is 43 km.

In Nigel, at the Balfour Road junction, the R42 cosigns with the R51 and R550 for a few kilometres westwards, forming the northern border of Nigel's CBD, up to the main four-way junction after the Glenverloch suburb. At this junction, as the R51 continues via a right turn (north) and the R550 continues straight (west), the R42 continues via a left turn. The R42 goes a small distance (15 km) south-west as Heidelberg-Nigel road, following the Blesbokspruit, to Heidelberg.

Entering Heidelberg, as Jacobs Street, the R42 crosses the N3 highway. At Louw Street, the R42 makes a right turn and a left turn at the next junction to become HF Verwoerd Street. It then intersects with the R23 road at an off-ramp junction just after the town centre and it continues west-south-west, becoming the southern border of the Suikerbosrand Nature Reserve. At the junction with the R551, the R42 continues, via a left turn, west-south-west, bypassing Meyerton, to Vereeniging. The journey from Heidelberg to Vereeniging is 45 km.

Upon entering Vereeniging, north of the Three Rivers East suburb, the R42 meets the R54 road from Vereeniging North & Potchefstroom. They are cosigned southwards up to the next junction. As the R54 continues south-east to Villiers, Free State, the R42 becomes the road west-south-west. It forms the main road through Three Rivers westwards as General Hertzog Road, separating the two sides of the Three Rivers suburb (Three Rivers North from Three Rivers South) and crossing the Klip River.

At Peacehaven, the R42 turns southwards, following the Vereeniging Railway, to reach a junction with the R82 road, just west of the R82's Vaal River crossing. At this junction, the R42 joins the R82 and they are co-signed westwards, crossing under the Vereeniging Railway, up to the 2nd junction (Voortrekker Street). As the R82 becomes Voortrekker Street northwards through Vereeniging Central, the R42 becomes Voortrekker Street southwards.

At the Lewis Street junction, Voortrekker Street (R42) becomes Barrage Road and turns west-south-west towards Vanderbijlpark. Near the suburb of Powerville, the R42 meets the R59 Sybrand van Niekerk Freeway (west southbound and east northbound off-ramps only). The R42 continues westwards as the main road through Vanderbijlpark, bypassing Sharpeville and passing the Vaal University of Technology. Adjacent to Vaal Mall, the R42 meets the R57 Golden Highway at a junction.

From the R57 Golden Highway junction, the R42 goes west for a further 15 km, meeting the southern terminus of the R553 road from Sebokeng. As the road continuing westwards joins the N1 Kroonvaal Toll Route southbound, the R42 route makes a left turn to become Boundary Road southwards and continues for 15 kilometres, crossing the Vaal River adjacent to the Vaal Barrage into the Free State, crossing to the other side of the N1 toll highway, to end at another junction with the R59 road approximately 18 kilometres east of the city of Parys, just west of the R59's intersection with the N1 highway.
