= R551 (South Africa) =

Regional route in South Africa

Regional route R551

Route information
- Maintained by GDRT
- Length: 42.6 km (26.5 mi)

Major junctions
- West end: R553 in Evaton
- R82 in De Deur; R59 in Meyerton; R557 near Suikerbosrand Nature Reserve
- East end: R42 near Suikerbosrand Nature Reserve

Location
- Country: South Africa

Highway system
- Numbered routes of South Africa
← R550	→ R552

The R551 is a Regional Route in Gauteng, South Africa that connects Evaton and Orange Farm with the Suikerbosrand Nature Reserve via Meyerton.

== Route ==
Its western terminus is a junction with the R553 (Golden Highway) south of Drieziek. It begins by heading eastwards as Saint Patrick Road, separating Evaton in the Emfuleni Local Municipality to the south from Orange Farm in the City of Johannesburg Metropolitan Municipality to the north. It then reaches a T-junction, where it becomes Rose Road north-eastwards and enters the Midvaal Local Municipality to reach a T-junction with the R82 (Old Johannesburg Road) in De Deur. The R551 joins the R82 southwards for 750 metres before becoming its own road east-south-east as Weilback Road.

It proceeds to enter the town of Meyerton, where it is joined by the M61 metropolitan route before forming an interchange with the R59 freeway (Sybrand van Niekerk freeway). After crossing the R59, the M61 becomes its own road northwards while the R551 remains as the road eastwards, passing through the southern part of the Meyerton town centre. It reaches a T-junction with Pierneef Boulevard, where it becomes Pierneef Boulevard northwards to pass through the eastern part of the Meyerton town centre before turning eastwards. It passes by the southern end of the village of Henley on Klip (crossing the Klip River) and proceeds to cross the R557 before reaching its eastern terminus at an intersection with the R42 near the south-western corner of the Suikerbosrand Nature Reserve (16 kilometres west-south-west of Heidelberg).
