= Spokes H =

South African township pop musician

- Born: Letona Spokes Hlatshwayo; 29 March 1968; South Africa
- Died: 23 July 2013 (aged 45) Vereeniging, Gauteng, South Africa
- Genres: Township pop
- Occupations: Musician, songwriter
- Years active: Late 1980s – 2013
- Labels: Gallo Record Company

Letona Spokes Hlatshwayo (29 March 1968 – 23 July 2013), known by his stage name Spokes H, was a South African township pop musician and songwriter. He rose to prominence in the late 1980s and 1990s through songs including Tamatisous, Rabaki, and Peace Magents. In 2018, he was posthumously honored with a Lifetime Achievement Award at the South African Music Awards.

== Early life ==
Spokes H was born on 29 March 1968 in Evaton township of Sebokeng.

== Career ==
Spokes H emerged as a recording artist and producer during the late 1980s before Kwaito music, a period marked by the growth of township pop and bubblegum music in South Africa. He started producing local musicians such as Sea Bee with a hit song, Thiba.He gained recognition for songs characterized by humor, everyday social themes, and multilingual lyrics reflecting township life.

He recorded and released music primarily through the Gallo Record Company, one of South Africa's largest record labels. His commercially successful songs included Tamatisous, which helped establish his popularity nationally, followed by Rabaki and Peace Magents, which further strengthened his reputation within the South African popular music industry.

== Death ==
Spokes H died on 23 July 2013 in Vereeniging after being hospitalized due to illness. Reports indicated that he experienced health complications related to chronic conditions, including hypertension and diabetes.

== Legacy ==
In 2018, the South African Music Awards posthumously honored him with a Lifetime Achievement Award, recognizing his contribution to the development of South African popular music.

== Discography ==
=== Albums ===
- Nnete E A Baba (1999)
- My African Groove
- On My Way Home
- Rafifi
- The Best of Spokes H

=== Selected songs ===
- Tamatisous
- Rabaki
- Peace Magents
- Mohla Ke Tsamayang
- Ba Ntebetse

== Awards and honours ==
- 2018 – Lifetime Achievement Award, South African Music Awards (posthumous)
