= R558 (South Africa) =

Regional route in South Africa

Regional route R558

Route information
- Maintained by GDRT

Major junctions
- North end: R24 in Krugersdorp
- R41 in Kagiso; R559 near Protea Glen; N12 near Protea Glen; R553 in Ennerdale; N1 in Lenasia South
- South end: R557 near Lenasia South

Location
- Country: South Africa

Highway system
- Numbered routes of South Africa
← R557	→ R559

The R558 is a Regional Route in Gauteng, South Africa that connects Krugersdorp with Ennerdale via Lenasia. It is made up of two disconnected sections (from Krugersdorp to the Lenz Military Base and from Lenasia to Ennerdale).

== Route ==
=== First section ===
Its northern terminus is a junction with the R24 in the eastern suburbs of Krugersdorp. It heads south through Krugersdorp's Kagiso township, crossing the R41 to skirt the western edge of Soweto. It then meets the eastern end of the R559 and intersects the N12 before reaching the Lenasia Railway Station on the eastern side of the Lenz Military Base, where the railway separates it from the town of Lenasia on the other side. This marks the end of the first section.

=== Second section ===
The second section begins just on the other side of the railway station, in the town of Lenasia (on the western side of the town centre). It heads south to pass through Lawley and Ennerdale and form an intersection with the R553, before crossing the N1 freeway (Kroonvaal Toll Route) and ending at a junction with the R557 south of Kanana Park.
