= Feroza Adam =

South African political activist

Member of the National Assembly
- In office 28 April 1994 – 9 August 1994

Personal details
- Born: 16 August 1961 Lenasia, Transvaal, South Africa
- Died: 8 August 1994 (aged 32) Cape Town, Western Cape, South Africa
- Party: United Democratic Front; African National Congress
- Occupation: Political activist
- Known for: Anti-apartheid activism

Feroza Adam (16 August 1961 – 8 August 1994) was a South African political activist, a publicist for the African National Congress and other organizations. She was elected to Parliament in 1994, shortly before she died in a car accident.

== Early life ==
Feroza Adam was raised in Johannesburg's Lenasia township, in a Muslim family. She studied at the University of Witwatersrand, where she became active in politics as a member of student groups affiliated with the Transvaal Indian Congress. She served on the executive board of the Azanian Students' Organization. Much later she pursued further studies in international relations and diplomacy at the Institute of International Relations Clingendael, in the Netherlands.

== Career ==
Feroza Adam taught school after finishing college. She joined the Federation of Transvaal Women (FEDTVAW) and the Federation of South African Women, and from 1984 to 1990 she served the latter federation as a publicist. From 1988, she worked full-time for the United Democratic Front. She helped to set up the African National Congress's regional office for Pretoria-Witwatersrand-Vereeniging, and served on the steering committee of the Women's National Coalition. She was publicity secretary for the ANC Women's League from 1992 to 1993. In 1990, she gave a speech to a national conference of women, saying:

"It is important for us to unite women committed to a non-racial, non-sexist, democratic South Africa. Otherwise we will find ourselves in the same situation as women from other countries in the post-liberation era. After having struggled together with their men for liberation, women comrades found their position had not changed. We need to assert our position as women more strongly now than ever before, and we can only do that as one, unified, loud voice."

In 1994, she was elected a Member of the National Parliament, in the first democratically elected government in South Africa.

== Death and remembrance ==
Feroza Adam died on 8 August 1994 from injuries sustained in an accident on 6 August, when she drove her car the wrong way onto a freeway exit in Cape Town. She died a few days before her 33rd birthday. Her remains were buried in Johannesburg.

The Institute for Gender Studies at UNISA sponsors an annual Feroza Adam Memorial Lecture, named in her memory. The iTouch Foundation is dedicated to working for Adam's interests in supporting young South Africans and alleviating poverty.

== See also ==
- List of members of the National Assembly of South Africa who died in office
