= Roshnee =

- Location within Gauteng Location within South Africa
- Coordinates: 26°34′S 27°56′E
- Country: South Africa
- Province: Gauteng
- District: Sedibeng
- Municipality: Emfuleni
- Main Place: Vereeniging
- Time zone: UTC+2 (SAST)
- Postal code (street): 1936

Roshnee is a suburb that is located in Vereeniging, Gauteng, South Africa. The town later expanded when Dadaville was established. It was expanded further after extension 1 was established.

== History ==
The township was established under the Group Areas Act by the Vereeniging Town Council and the apartheid government as a segregated housing development for Indians living in the Vaal Triangle in the late 1960s. The adjoining area of Dadaville was created to alleviate housing shortages in Roshnee.

The Vereenging Airport FAVV is located east of the town.

== Education ==
- Roshnee Primary School (grades 1-7)
- Roshnee Secondary School (grades 8-12)
- Roshnee Islamic School (grades 1-12)

== Sports ==
- Roshnee Stadium
