= Bophelong =

- Location within Gauteng Location within South Africa
- Coordinates: 26°41′S 27°48′E
- Country: South Africa
- Province: Gauteng
- District: Sedibeng
- Municipality: Emfuleni

Area
  - Total: 9.67 km^{2} (3.73 sq mi)

Population (2011)
  - Total: 46,089
  - Density: 4,770/km^{2} (12,300/sq mi)

Racial makeup (2011)
  - Black African: 99.1%
  - Coloured: 0.5%
  - Indian/Asian: 0.1%
  - White: 0.1%
  - Other: 0.3%

First languages (2011)
  - Sotho: 69.4%
  - Xhosa: 10.7%
  - Zulu: 9.3%
  - Other: 9.0%
- Time zone: UTC+2 (SAST)
- Postal code (street): 1911/1913
- PO box: 1913

Bophelong meaning 'a place of life' is a township near Vanderbijlpark, Gauteng, South Africa. It was established in 1955 to house black residents who worked in Vanderbijlpark and Vereeniging.

The location has now been extended by another location right next to it called Muvhango with 18 extensions. As big as the location is, it has only 1 clinic, library, satellite police station, 4 secondary schools and 5 primary schools. The municipality announced in early 2016 that they will build a shopping complex in the location between Extension 14 and Extension 15, which will be called Bophelong Mall. In 2017 during the meeting of the budget, public participation and the Integrated Development Plan (IDP) 2017/2021, these rumors were dismissed, "Nquba dismissed rumours about a new mall was going to be built in Bophelong. He said the billboard that has been put up about the mall being built was made by ‘chancers’ adding that once there's information on this, everyone, including the stakeholders will be made aware."

== Neighbouring townships ==
Neighbouring townships include Sebokeng, Boipatong, Small Farms, Boitumelo, Polokong, Golden Gardens, and Lakeside.
