= Ormonde, Gauteng =

Ormonde
- Location within Gauteng Location within South Africa
- Coordinates: 26.242°S 28.000°E
- Country: South Africa
- Province: Gauteng
- Municipality: City of Johannesburg
- Main Place: Johannesburg

Area
  - Total: 4.99 km^{2} (1.93 sq mi)

Population (2011)
  - Total: 9,823
  - Density: 1,970/km^{2} (5,100/sq mi)

Racial makeup (2011)
  - Black African: 20.6%
  - Coloured: 40%
  - Indian/Asian: 20.8
  - White: 2.2%
  - Other: 3.9%

First languages (2011)
  - English: 34.9%
  - Zulu: 18.9%
  - Sotho: 9.5%
  - Tswana: 8.7%
  - Other: 28.1%
- Time zone: UTC+2 (SAST)
- Postal code (street): 2091

Ormonde is a suburb of Johannesburg, South Africa. It is located in Region F of the City of Johannesburg Metropolitan Municipality.

== History ==
The suburb was first proposed by Crown Mines Ltd in November 1970, as Ormonde Extension 1.
