= Sharpeville =

- Location within Gauteng Location within South Africa
- Coordinates: 26°41′19″S 27°52′17″E
- Country: South Africa
- Province: Gauteng
- District: Sedibeng
- Municipality: Emfuleni

Area
  - Total: 4.99 km^{2} (1.93 sq mi)

Population (2011)
  - Total: 37,599
  - Density: 7,530/km^{2} (19,500/sq mi)

Racial makeup (2011)
  - Black African: 99.5%
  - Coloured: 0.2%
  - Indian/Asian: 0.1%
  - White: 0%
  - Other: 0.2%

First languages (2011)
  - Sotho: 76.4%
  - Xhosa: 6.8%
  - Zulu: 6.5%
  - Tswana: 3.1%
  - Other: 7.3%
- Time zone: UTC+2 (SAST)
- Postal code (street): 1928
- PO box: 1933
- Website: http://sharpeville.co.za/

Sharpeville (also spelled Sharpville) is a township situated between two large industrial cities, Vanderbijlpark and Vereeniging, in southern Gauteng, South Africa. Sharpeville is one of the oldest of six townships in the Vaal Triangle. It was named after John Lillie Sharpe who came to South Africa from Glasgow, Scotland, as secretary of Stewarts & Lloyds. Sharpe was elected to the Vereeniging City Council in 1932 and held the position of mayor from 1934 to 1937.

The main reason for the establishment of Sharpeville was the relocation of people from "Top Location" to an area away from Vereeniging because it was felt black people were too close to Vereeniging for comfort. Because the project was intended only to relocate residents of "Top Location", and not to house additional people, it did not alleviate the housing shortage. What was planned as a five-year resettlement project beginning in 1935, in fact, took 20 years. In 1941, 16,000 people lived in "Top Location". The building of the houses only started in 1942. A sub-economic housing scheme was used for Sharpeville. Water was free but 14 houses shared one tap and there were two bathing complexes in the township. By 1946 some of the houses had their own taps and bathrooms. The township was first called "Sharpe Native Township" but it changed to Sharpeville in the 1950s.

== Place in South African history ==
With the implementation of the apartheid government's Group Areas Act 21 of 1950, it was estimated that over 3.5 million South Africans were forcibly removed from 1960 to 1982. Of the "Top Location" residents, Blacks were moved to Sharpeville, Coloureds to Rus-ter-vaal and Indians to Roshnee. The Indians were the last ethnic group to leave "Top Location", the last residents being moved to Roshnee in 1974. In 2004, the people of Top Location were compensated for the loss of their properties and land, and an amount of R60,000 per house was paid to all former residents or dependants.

On 21 March 1960, the Sharpeville massacre occurred when the PAC (Pan Africanist Congress) organized a protest in which black Africans attempted to hand in to police their Apartheid-required pass books which restricted them from going in certain areas. Although the crowd was peaceful throughout the day, over 70 white officers and men of the South African Police (SAP), 13 of them armed with sub machine guns, fired at point blank range (a distance of three to five meters at most according to police testimony). They had been ordered to fire by the Officer in Charge. According to official figures released at the time by Prime Minister Henrik Verwoerd's government, 69 Africans were killed and 180 wounded by the police. All of these people were long term residents of Sharpeville. None were "migrant workers."

A new book published in 2024 and based on extensive research in police documents held by the South African National Archives in Pretoria has now demonstrated that the "69 killed and 180 injured" was a severe undercount and was in fact a police lie. Using these police documents that were initially created in 1960, 1961, and 1962, the two authors now show that the number of killed on 21 March 1960 was at least 91 and probably more, and that the number injured, many of them crippled for life, was at least 238. These same records also contain at least 250 witness statements collected from Sharpville residents in 1961 and 1962, all of them given under oath and attested to by the police at the time. The names and ages of all the victims are recorded in this new book by Nancy L. Clark and William H. Worger.

Sharpeville was also the site of a murder in 1984 which led to the arrest, trial, and controversial death sentences (later commuted) of the Sharpeville Six.

Symbolically, Nelson Mandela signed the South African Constitution in Sharpeville on 10 December 1996. He also opened "The Sharpeville Memorial" to honour the victims of the Sharpeville massacre of 1960. 21 March is now celebrated as Human Rights Day.

== Neighbouring townships ==
Neighbouring townships include Evaton, Orange Farm, Bophelong, Small Farms, Golden Gardens, and Sebokeng.
