= Walkerville, South Africa =

Walkerville
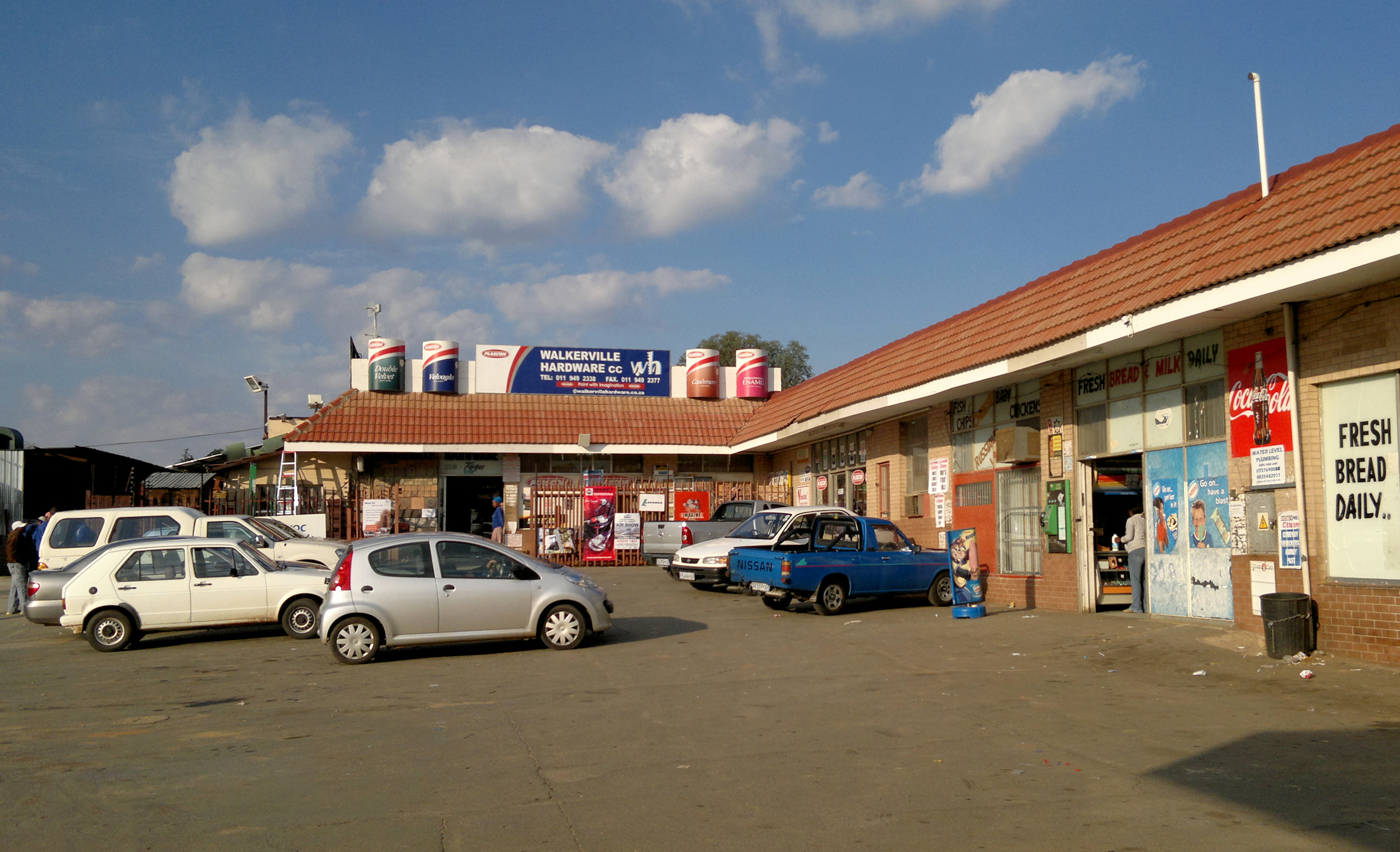

- Location within Gauteng Location within South Africa
- Coordinates: 26.420°S 27.957°E
- Country: South Africa
- Province: Gauteng
- District: Sedibeng
- Municipality: Midvaal

Area
  - Total: 97.07 km^{2} (37.48 sq mi)

Population (2011)
  - Total: 9,173
  - Density: 94.50/km^{2} (244.8/sq mi)

Racial makeup (2011)
  - Black African: 53.2%
  - Coloured: 5.6%
  - Indian/Asian: 0.9%
  - White: 39.4%
  - Other: 0.9%

First languages (2011)
  - English: 34.5%
  - Afrikaans: 18.2%
  - Zulu: 14.9%
  - Sotho: 13.0%
  - Other: 19.4%
- Time zone: UTC+2 (SAST)
- Postal code (street): 1961
- PO box: 1876

Walkerville is a village in Gauteng, South Africa, about 30 km (20 mi) south of Johannesburg on the R82 road.
