= Lenasia =

Suburb in Gauteng, South Africa

Lenasia Lenz
- Location within Gauteng Location within South Africa Location within Africa
- Coordinates: 26°19′1″S 27°49′40″E
- Country: South Africa
- Province: Gauteng
- Municipality: City of Johannesburg

Area
  - Total: 20.28 km^{2} (7.83 sq mi)

Population (2011)
  - Total: 89,714
  - Density: 4,424/km^{2} (11,460/sq mi)

Racial makeup (2011)
  - Black African: 40.4%
  - Coloured: 2.6%
  - Indian/Asian: 55.9%
  - White: 0.2%
  - Other: 0.9%

First languages (2011)
  - English: 55.4%
  - IsiZulu: 8.8%
  - Setswana: 8.2%
  - Sesotho: 6.4%
  - Other: 21.2%
- Time zone: UTC+2 (SAST)
- Postal code (street): 1821
- PO box: 1827
- Area code: 011

Lenasia, also known as Lenz, is a suburb south of Soweto in the Gauteng province, South Africa, originally created to house Indians. It is located in Region G of the City of Johannesburg Metropolitan Municipality. Lenasia is approximately 35 kilometres southwest of the Johannesburg CBD.

== History ==
=== Early history ===
Apartheid-era planners situated the group area for Johannesburg's Indians near the Lenz Military Base. It originates from 1958. The name "Lenasia" is thought to be a combination of the words "Lenz" and "Asia". The Lenz in question was one Captain Lenz who owned the original plot on which Lenasia is situated. According to Parnell and Pirie the foundations for Lenasia were laid in 1963. Many of its early residents were forcibly removed under the Group Areas Act from Pageview and the portion of Vrededorp populated by non whites (jointly known as Fietas) and Fordsburg, areas close to the Johannesburg city centre, to Lenasia. As segregation grew it became the largest place where people of Indian extraction could legally live in the Transvaal Province.

In 1899, the Vanwyksrust Fort and Gaol of the ZAR was built around the same time as the Old Fort at Constitution Hill in Braamfontein. Only remnants now remain of the original structure on the corner of the Golden Highway and the R554 - (26.33899°S 27.90091°E).

On the north-western outskirts of Lenasia, west of the Klip River wetland and alongside the N12 highway, is the Zuurbekom Pumphouse. It was built in 1899 (127 years ago) and is still operational. Its purpose was to extract and provide the water from the dolomite rocks under the vast wetland to Central Witwatersrand. In 1975, it was declared a National Monument, and subsequently made into a Provincial Heritage Site in 2000.

In 1910, Gandhi was gifted land by Hermann Kallenbach on the outskirts of Lenasia, and established the Tolstoy Farm; it is now situated on land owned by Corobrik. On it is a museum and training centre.

On 27 September 1992, Nelson Mandela gave an address at the opening of the Gandhi Hall.

== Geography ==
=== Cityscape ===
The township is large, and divided into extensions (Extensions 1-13) including a major suburb south of Lenasia, called Lenasia South and referred to as Daxina by the locals. Anchorville is the industrial park, located between Lenasia and Lenasia South.

Above Nirvana Drive (a section of the R554), is the Olifantsvlei Nature Reserve, a protected wetland lake area.

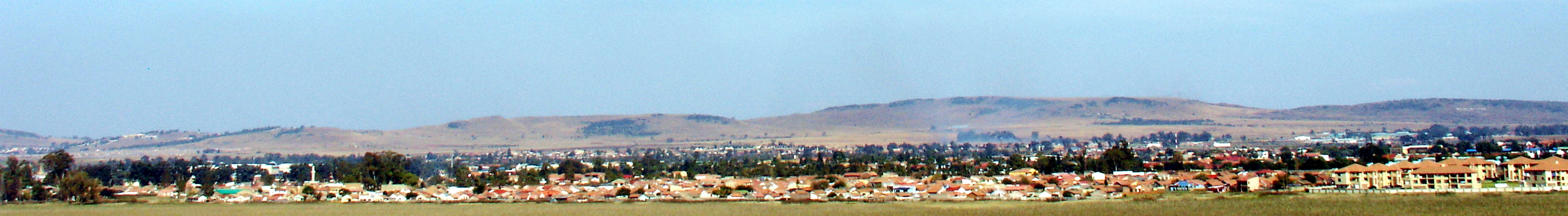
A panoramic view of Lenasia as seen from the nearby N12 Freeway. On the left can be seen the town's most famous landmark – the Trade Route Mall (opened in April 2006) – whilst on the right is a townhouse complex (a common sight in contemporary Lenasia) called The Reeds. In the centre can be seen several of the residential areas of Lenasia with many minarets (representing the many mosques of the town) interspersed within it.

=== Lenasia South ===
Lenasia South Daxina
- Town
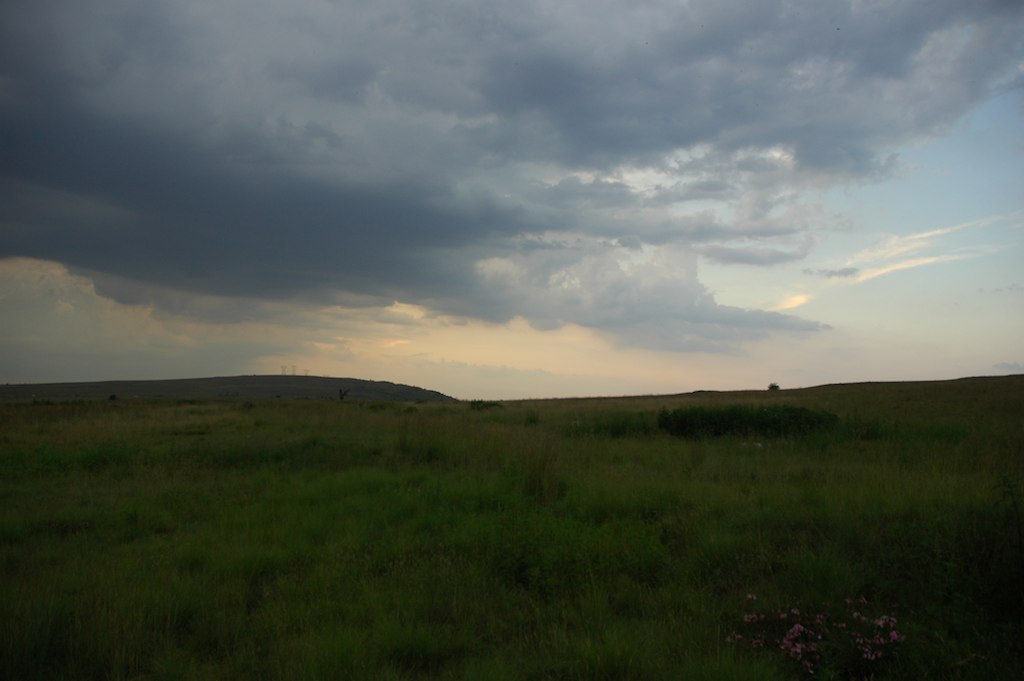
- Interactive map of Lenasia South
- Country: South Africa
- Province: Gauteng
- District: City of Johannesburg

Area
  - Total: 13.98 km^{2} (5.40 sq mi)

Population (2011)
  - Total: 37,110
  - Density: 2,655/km^{2} (6,875/sq mi)

Racial makeup (2011)
  - Indian/Asian: 49.00%
  - Black African: 46.24%
  - Coloured: 3.73%
  - Other: 0.88%
  - White: 0.15%

First languages (2011)
  - English: 53.07%
  - isiZulu: 12.88%
  - Sesotho: 8.56%
  - isiXhosa: 5.98%
  - Setswana: 5.77%
  - Afrikaans: 3.73%
  - Xitsonga: 2.83%
- Postal code: 1829
- PO box: 1835
- Area code: 011

Lenasia South is located separately from the main extensions of Lenasia. It is found on the R558 road before Ennerdale. It has a population of 37,110. The Lawley Lake is found here.

==== History ====
In January 2021, construction began on a 15 megalitre reservoir at a cost of R 45 million in Lenasia South. The reservoir was built to address low water pressure and water shortage issues surrounding Lenasia. After its opening on 30 June 2022, residents faced the same issues.

== Economy ==
Lenasia is now a vibrant and thriving community. The rapidly growing suburb has shopping malls (Trade Route Mall & Signet Terrace Shopping Centre), churches, temples, mosques, shops, banks and various industrial and commercial sectors. It also boasts numerous other restaurants with well known franchises.

There are several prominent publications and newspapers based in Lenasia such as Lenasia Times, and the Rising Sun Newspaper.

Four satellite radio stations, Radio Islam, Eastwave FM, Channel Islam International and Lenz Fm broadcast from Lenasia.

Lenasia embraced the digital age when in 2002 a community website lenzinfo was launched, which keeps the community informed on happenings, sports events, religious and cultural activities and general information.

In September 2023, City Power conducted a disconnection drive of non-paying customers in Lenasia in an attempt to collect revenue; the Lenasia SDC owed R 1.3 billion.

== Law and government ==
=== Government ===
It is located in Region G of the City of Johannesburg Metropolitan Municipality. The Lenasia SDC (service delivery centre) includes the neighbouring suburbs of Lenasia South, Vlakfontein, Hopefield, Ennerdale, Nancefield and Grasmere.

=== Politics ===
The community of Lenasia played a prominent role in opposing the national tricameral elections held in 1984 and 1989 under the apartheid era National Party government. This was an attempt to create separate legislative assemblies in South Africa for Whites, Indians and Coloureds in order to entrench racial segregation and perpetuate the disenfranchisement of the African majority in South Africa. Lenasia also played a role in the creation and activities of the United Democratic Front (UDF), the mass democratic movement that opposed apartheid in the 1980s and early 1990s before the unbanning of the African National Congress. Many of Lenasia's residents played a prominent role in the UDF structures and the broader anti-apartheid movement. Some of these activists became senior political figures after the first national democratic elections in 1994.

== Parks and greenspace ==
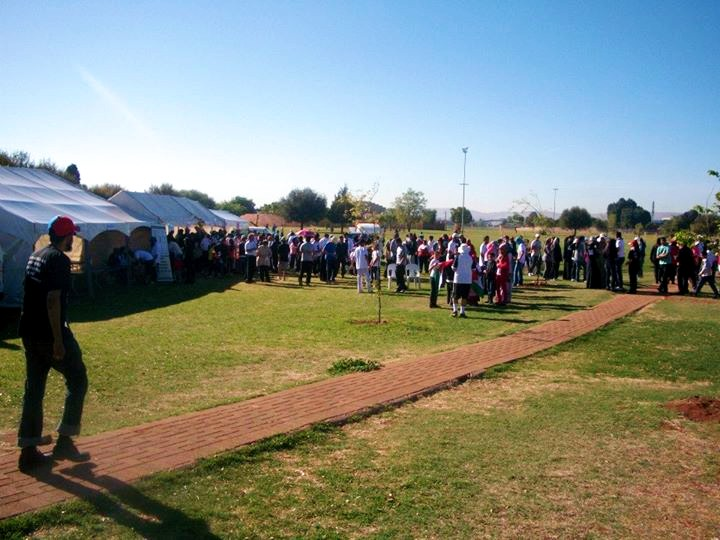
Rose Park in September 2012.

Rose Park a popular venue amongst Lenasia residents for public events and for family relaxation on weekends. The park, which consists of aesthetically-pleasant rose bushes and a fountain, also has a special stimulation and play area that are specifically for children with disabilities. It also featured as a fan park during the 2010 FIFA World Cup.

Rose Park is also the venue for the popular parkrun', which takes place every Saturday at 8am.

== Sport ==
=== Cricket ===
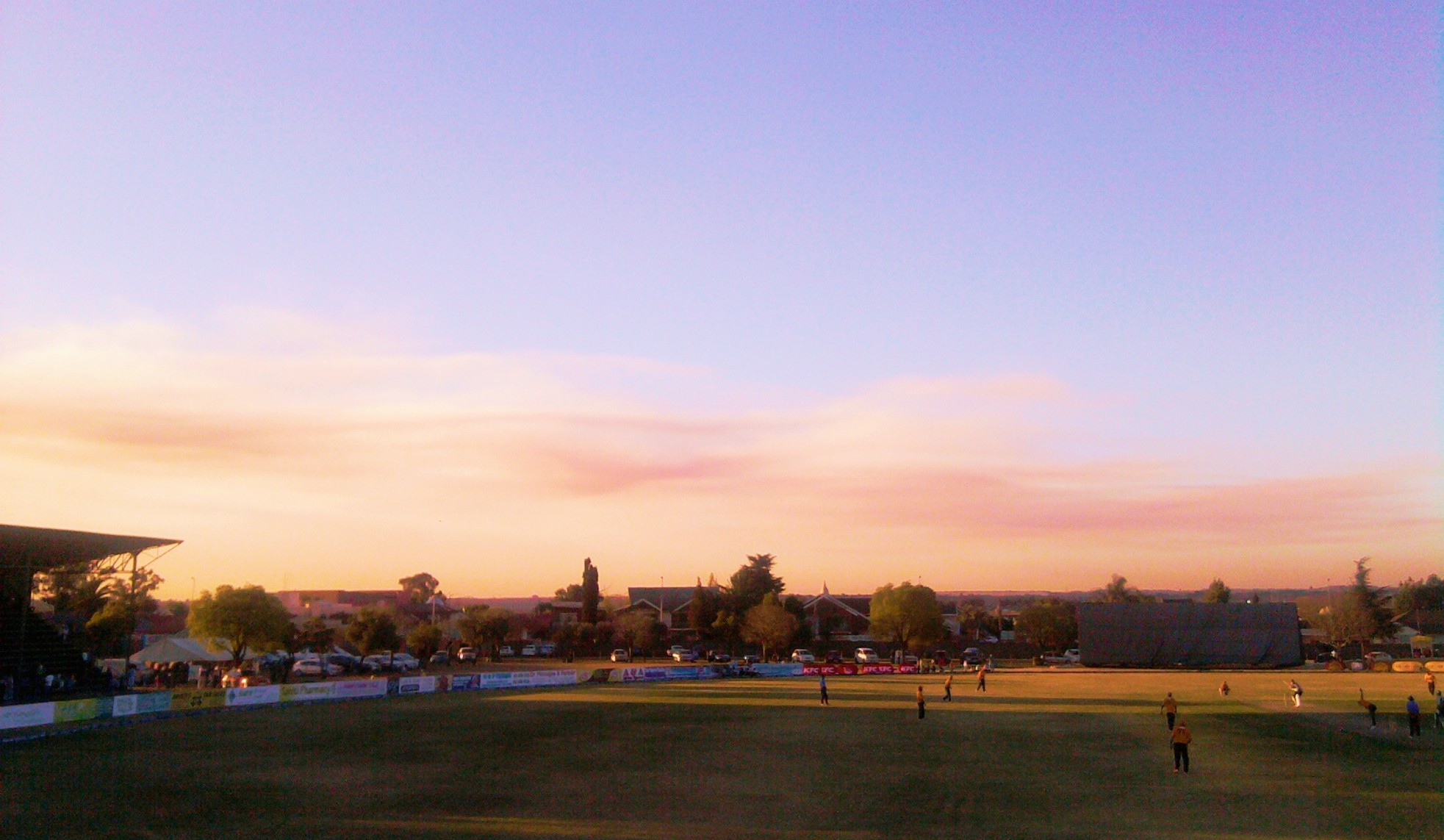
Crescent Hawks and Cavalier Cats cricket match - Lenasia Cricket Stadium in September 2011.

Lenasia played host to Transvaal and matches played in the Howa Bowl were played at the Lenasia Stadium.

The GM LPL (Lenasia Premier League) is a prominent annual Twenty20-styled cricket tournament played during September. It commenced in 2010.

== Religious places ==
=== Hinduism ===
==== Shree Rameshwar Mahadev Mandir ====
Shree Rameshwar Mahadev Mandir is situated in Lenasia. The Mandir was built by the community, for the Community in 1988. The main aim is to promote, support, and perpetuate the worship of Shree Rameshwar Mahadev, to celebrate religious festivals, holy days & charitable events, and the continuous worship & spiritual guidance from Shree Rameshwar Mahadev.

== Noted residents ==
- Feroza Adam, political activist
- Candice Morgan, actor and Miss Deaf World SA
- Ahmed Kathrada, ANC activist
- Mahatma Gandhi, led protests against colonial British rule at Lenasia Train Station
- Abu Baker Asvat, medical doctor and political activist
