= Vanderbijlpark =

- City
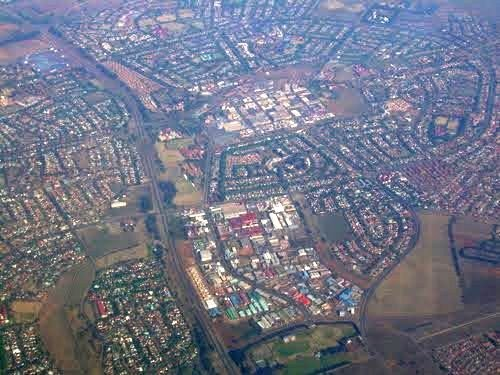
- Vanderbijlpark from the air

- Location within Gauteng Location within South Africa Location within Africa
- Coordinates: 26°41′57″S 27°50′8″E
- Country: South Africa
- Province: Gauteng
- District: Sedibeng
- Municipality: Emfuleni

Area
  - Total: 177.84 km^{2} (68.66 sq mi)
- Elevation: 1,500 m (4,900 ft)

Population (2011)
  - Total: 95,840
  - Density: 538.9/km^{2} (1,396/sq mi)

Racial makeup (2011)
  - Black African: 42.5%
  - Coloured: 1.3%
  - Indian/Asian: 0.9%
  - White: 54.4%
  - Other: 0.9%

First languages (2011)
  - Afrikaans: 51.0%
  - Sotho: 19.9%
  - English: 10.0%
  - Zulu: 4.9%
  - Other: 14.2%
- Time zone: UTC+2 (SAST)
- Postal code (street): 1911
- PO box: 1900
- Area code: 016

Vanderbijlpark is an industrial city with approximately 95,000 inhabitants, situated on the Vaal River in the south of Gauteng province, South Africa. The city is named after Hendrik van der Bijl, an electrical engineer and industrialist.

Vanderbijlpark is home to Vanderbijlpark Steel, previously part of the South African Iron and Steel Corporation (ISCOR), which subsequently became a subsidiary of the global company ArcelorMittal. With neighbouring cities Vereeniging and Sasolburg, it forms the Vaal Triangle, historically a major industrial region of South Africa. It is situated in the local municipality of Emfuleni and district municipality of Sedibeng.

The peri-urban black townships Boipatong, Muvango, Bophelong, Sebokeng, Evaton, Tshepiso and Sharpeville are close to the city.

== History ==
In 1920, Dr HJ van der Bijl, a young South African electrical engineer working in the United States at the time, was called back to South Africa by the then prime minister Jan Smuts to advise the government in the planning of South Africa's industrial development. Van der Bijl oversaw the Iron and Steel Corporation's first plant at Pretoria, but with the increased demand after World War II, 100 km^{2} was bought to construct a large steel works and establish a model town. The steelworks began operating in 1947 and the town was proclaimed in 1942. The town attained municipal status on 29 October 1952 when Governor General Dr EG Jansen opened ISCOR's second steel works. The founder of the town, Hendrik van der Bijl, had his old house situated in Grieg street, in the affluent SW5 proper suburb. In 1952 even larger steelworks were opened, and the industrial settlement finally gained municipal status after many decades of governance under the South African Iron and Steel Industrial Corporation in Pretoria. By 1952 the town was officially known as the major steel-producing center of South Africa.

Mittal Steel South Africa announced the closure of its Newcastle and Vereeniging steel-making operations in January 2025.

== Climate ==
Vanderbijlpark is situated on the highveld of South Africa, at an altitude of 1,500 meters on the banks of the Vaal River. Summers in the city are warm to hot with an average high between 31 and 35°C, and an average low between 15 and 22°C. Winters in the city are cool to warm with an average high of between 18 and 23°C and an average low of between −1 and 5°C.

Climate data for Vanderbijlpark
Month	Jan	Feb	Mar	Apr	May	Jun	Jul	Aug	Sep	Oct	Nov	Dec	Year
Record high °C (°F)	43 (109)	36 (97)	35 (95)	33 (91)	28 (82)	25 (77)	25 (77)	28 (82)	32 (90)	35 (95)	38 (100)	38 (100)	43 (109)
Mean daily maximum °C (°F)	29 (84)	28 (82)	27 (81)	24 (75)	22 (72)	19 (66)	20 (68)	22 (72)	26 (79)	27 (81)	27 (81)	28 (82)	25 (77)
Daily mean °C (°F)	22 (72)	21 (70)	20 (68)	17 (63)	14 (57)	10 (50)	11 (52)	14 (57)	18 (64)	19 (66)	20 (68)	21 (70)	17 (63)
Mean daily minimum °C (°F)	17 (63)	16 (61)	15 (59)	5 (41)	−1 (30)	−2 (28)	1 (34)	7 (45)	12 (54)	14 (57)	16 (61)	17 (63)	12 (54)
Record low °C (°F)	8 (46)	11 (52)	6 (43)	2 (36)	−3 (27)	−7 (19)	−4 (25)	−1 (30)	2 (36)	4 (39)	7 (45)	7 (45)	−6 (21)
Average precipitation mm (inches)	154 (6.1)	75 (3.0)	82 (3.2)	51 (2.0)	13 (0.5)	7 (0.3)	3 (0.1)	6 (0.2)	22 (0.9)	71 (2.8)	98 (3.9)	120 (4.7)	703 (27.7)
Average precipitation days	14	11	10	7	3	1	1	2	3	9	12	15	87
Mean monthly sunshine hours	261	235	254	246	283	271	289	296	284	275	254	272	3,220
Source 1: South African Weather Service
Source 2: The Weather Network (sun only)

== Suburbs ==
Vanderbijlpark was designed in a circular outlay, rather than the traditional grid design of towns. The town is divided into four distinct residential blocks, namely:

- CE (Central East)
- CW (Central West)
- SE (South East)
- SW (South West)

Vanderbijlpark CBD on Wikimapia

A map showing the suburbs of Vanderbijlpark.

The different suburbs are then named as follows:

- CE1
- CE2
- CE3
- CE4
- CW1
- CW2
- CW3
- CW4
- CW5
- CW6
- SE1
- SE2
- SE3
- SE4
- SE6
- SE7
- SE8
- SW1
- SW2
- SW5

The other suburbs of Vanderbijlpark are:

- Boipatong
- Bophelong
- Bonnane
- Flora Gardens

There are also a number of small holdings in Vanderbijlpark:

- Theoville
- Lamont Park

== Economy ==
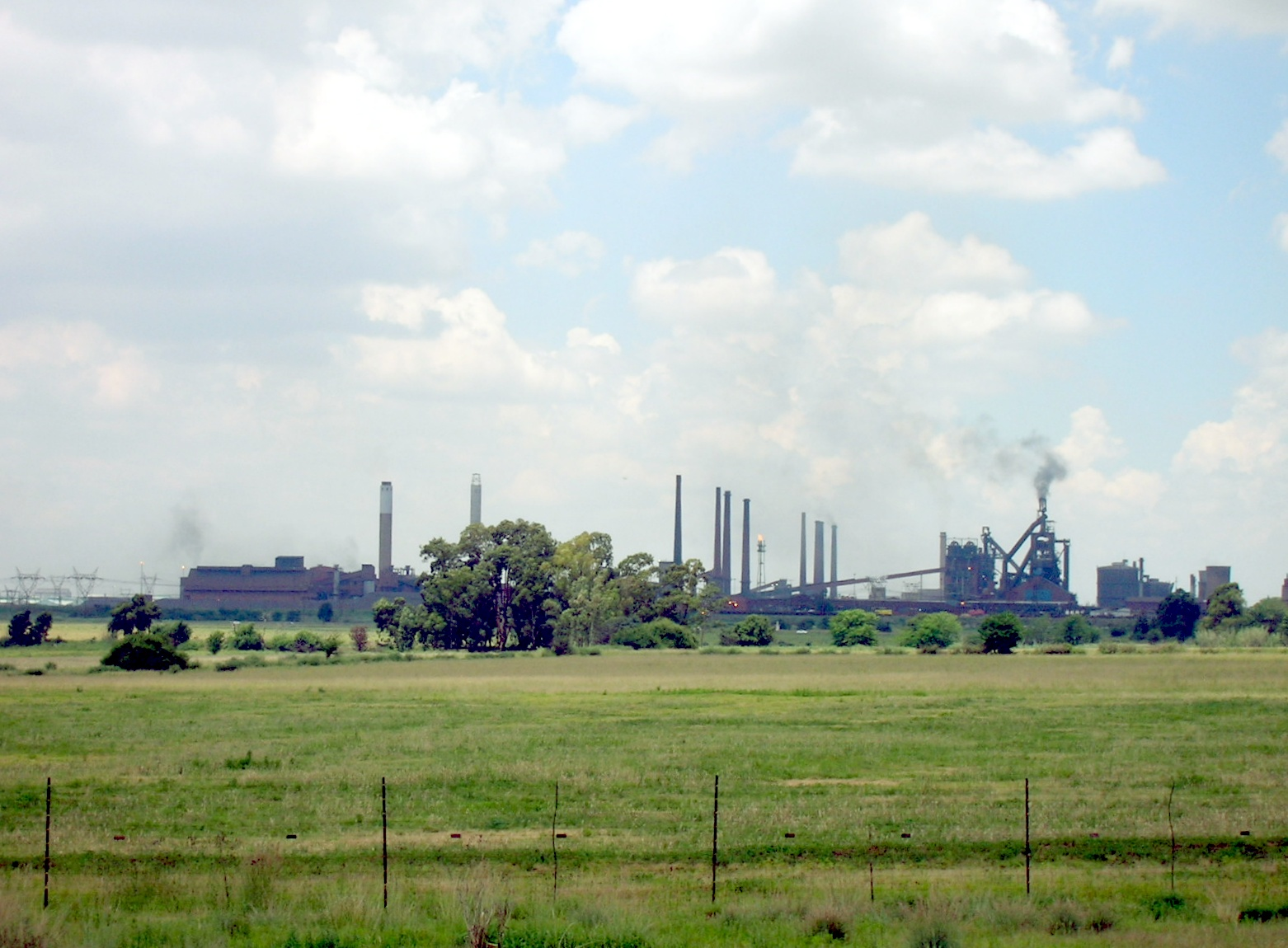
The steel mill at Vanderbijlpark, owned by ArcelorMittal.

About 60% of the town's workforce are employed in factories. The rest work for the Government, private businesses, shops or in the service sector. Rossini Boulevard used to be a residential area, but in recent years most of the homes have been turned into informal businesses.

Since 2015 the town has had a gradual negative economic growth, to such a degree that the local council was declared bankrupt in November 2019. This happened when billions of property tax proceeds to the municipality were stolen by local government officials.

The 2019 bankruptcy of the local government was due to billions of unpaid accounts to Rand Water and Eskom. This has caused a significant collapse in industries and in turn; building development in the town.

As of August 2026, the Emfuleni Local Municipality owed R10.8 billion to creditors.

== Architecture ==
Most of the town's houses were built by ISCOR during the 1947–1964 period, and these homes are all built in exactly the same format. About 60% of the town's population lives in these homes. Some modern suburbs were established by the wealthy on the banks of the Vaal River. Large, modern buildings and apartment blocks were erected in open areas around the CBD.

The suburb called SW5 houses some of the most extravagant and sought-after estates in the Vaal triangle. Dr. HJ van der Bijl and Aldridge had built their private estates in this area during the late 1800s, and these homes are now privately owned and still preserved on Grieg street in SW5. Some of the stands in the area range between 2–4 acres. The stands used to be much larger in the day of Dr van der Bijl, however, further development of the town increased the use of subdivided stands.

Another significant part of the Vaal's wealth lies on the Marlbank of the Vaal River towards Loch Vaal, west of the CBD. Some of these homes are sized up to 7,000 square meters and more. The area is often also referred to as the "billionaires bend" as it houses some of the most expensive homes in Africa, ranging from R100 million upwards for a single property. Many of the inhabitants of the Marlbank river stretch do not necessarily have business interests in the town itself. Many of them live there because of the picturesque landscapes and extravagant estates. Helicopter sights are frequent as the wealthy property owners on Marlbank fly in and out from the city of Johannesburg 80km North of Vanderbijlpark.

Vanderbijlpark has major influences of Dutch, French, German, and Italian architecture, due to the settlement of foreigners during the late 1800s and early 1900s. From the early 1900s up until the late 1980s the local building industry was owned by a select group of wealthy developers represented by companies such as Visser Properties and the Visser family, Dias Family, and Storm Family to name a few. Construction and design companies thrived during these times, such as van der Merwe & Associates Engineering, DG Ladegaard also Modern Homes Architects, founded by Gwendolyn Olive Ferreira and Leslie van Wyk in 1987 (later named DOS). DOS was renamed Go Homes again in 2012 and is currently owned by Jean Marx, the grandson of Gwen Ferreira. Jean Marx and the Companies owned by the Jean Marx & Asma Dukanda brands moved to the city of Johannesburg and were last known to operate from Parkwood & Saxonwold.

The town center also consists of many old buildings also showcasing the beautiful homes built during the late 1800s and early 1900s, some have fallen into dramatic decay over the years. Continuous efforts are however undertaken by some individuals and companies to restore these classic homes to their former glory.

SW5 Proper and Vaal riverfront properties remain some of the most extravagant and largest homes in the country to this day. The value of these properties has however dramatically declined since 2015 due to corruption in local government.

== Education ==
There are over 60 primary and secondary schools within the Vaal Triangle area. Of these, 20 primary and 8 secondary schools are located in Vanderbijlpark. There are about 5 private schools in Vanderbijpark, Namely: El Shaddai School, Emmanuel Christian School, Vaal Primary School, Santa Maria Junior School, Curro Vanderbiljpark and Watershed Christian School.

=== Secondary education ===
Secondary Schools located in Vanderbijlpark are:

- Hoërskool Vanderbijlpark
- Hoër Tegniese Skool Carel de Wet
- Hoërskool Driehoek
- Hoërskool Suiderlig (formerly Hoër Handelskool Lettie Fouché)
- Suncrest High
- Prestigious Accurate High
- Vaal Park Articon
- Hoërskool Transvalia
- The Vaal High School
- Curro Vanderbiljpark High School

=== Tertiary education ===
The Vaal Triangle Campus of the North-West University is located in Vanderbijlpark. This campus is situated on the banks of the Vaal River.

The main campus of the Vaal University of Technology is located in Vanderbijlpark, about 1 km from the North West University.

Qualitas Career Academy, a national private college has its largest campus in SE4. It caters for full-time and part-time studies for students as well as corporate training and consulting services for businesses and government departments.

Eduvos, formerly the Computer Training institute (CTI) has a satellite campus in central Vanderbijlpark.

== Entertainment ==
Vanderbijlpark is home to the Emerald Casino Resort, Emfuleni Golf Course, Isaac Steyl Rugby Stadium and the Vaal Mall, constructed in the mid 2000's, and with the Pont de Vaal wine estate, hotel and restaurant right around the corner. There are public swimming facilities in the suburbs of SE 2 and CW 6, as well as in the Vaal River. The Vaal Horse Race Course is about 3 km from the city.

== Demographics ==
According to the 2011 Census, Vanderbijlpark occupied an area of 178 km². The population was 95,840, which can be broken down as follows: 54.44% White, 42.52% Black, 1.27% Coloured and 0.89% Asian. The population density was 539 persons per km² (1,400 persons per mi²).

== Notable residents ==
- Ray Jennings, former coach of the South African cricket team, was born in Vanderbijlpark.
- Behati Prinsloo, Namibian supermodel, lived in Vanderbijlpark for three years as a child before moving to Namibia.
- Shaun Sowerby, former Springbok rugby and Natal Sharks captain, was from Vanderbijlpark. He attended Oliver Lodge Primary school from 1985–1991, then attended Sasol High from 1992–1996.
- Francois Pienaar, captain of the 1995 IRB World Cup winning Springbok rugby team, was from Vanderbijlpark.
- Diaan Lawrenson, known for her role as Paula in local soapie "7de Laan", is also from Vanderbijlpark.
- Thabo Rakhale professional soccer player was born in Vanderbijlpark, born 20 March 1990 who currently plays as a winger for South African club Sekhukhune United.
- Katia Guerreiro, South African-Portuguese fado singer, was born in Vanderbijlpark but grew up in the Azores.

== Town twinning ==
Vanderbijlpark is town twinned with:

Eindhoven, Netherlands
