= Randvaal =

- Location within Gauteng Location within South Africa
- Coordinates: 26°30′7″S 28°2′55″E
- Country: South Africa
- Province: Gauteng
- District: Sedibeng
- Municipality: Midvaal

Area
  - Total: 9.14 km^{2} (3.53 sq mi)

Population (2024)
  - Total: 3,200
  - Density: 350/km^{2} (910/sq mi)

Racial makeup (2024)
  - Black African: 70.1%
  - Coloured: 2.0%
  - Indian/Asian: 1.0%
  - White: 26.8%
  - Other: 0.1%

First languages (2024)
  - Sotho: 42.1%
  - Afrikaans: 14.4%
  - English: 12.7%
  - Zulu: 19.9%
  - Other: 17.6%
- Time zone: UTC+2 (SAST)
- Postal code (street): 1961
- PO box: 1873
- Area code: 016

Randvaal a small industrial community located in the Midvaal Local Municipality that falls under Meyerton CBD in the Gauteng province of South Africa. Randvaal consists of four suburbs which are Daleside, Henley on Klip, Highbury and the industrial giant Valley settlements. Out of all three of its amazing suburbs Daleside is considered to be the middle child of all three suburbs as it is the busiest and has the highest "crime rate", said by locals in the community, compared to its neighbouring sister Henley on Klip.
