= Suikerbosrand Nature Reserve =

Nature Reserve in Gauteng, South Africa

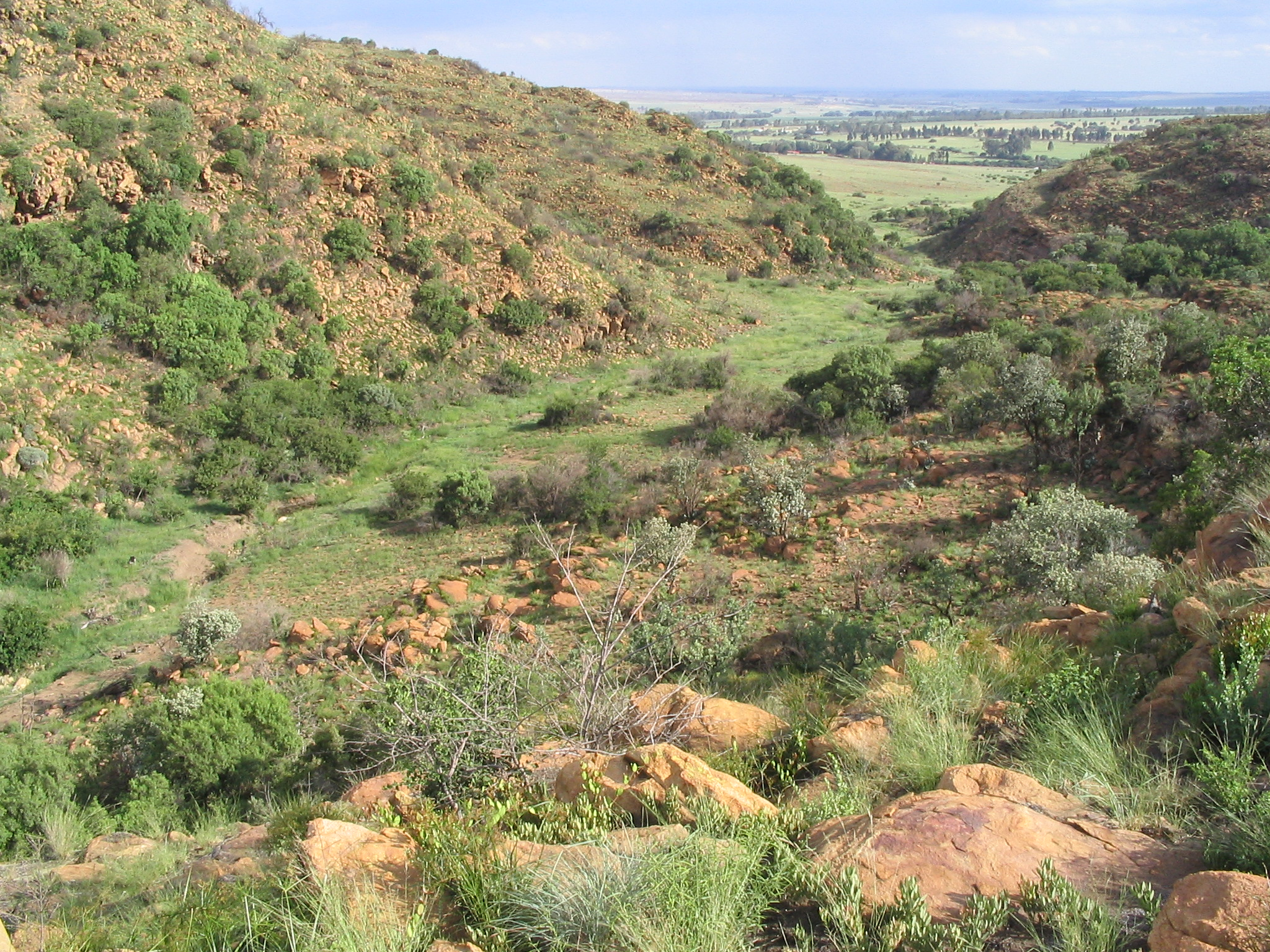
- Suikerbosrand Nature Reserve gorge
- Interactive map of Suikerbosrand Nature Reserve
- Location: South Africa
- Nearest city: Heidelberg, Gauteng
- Coordinates: 26°30′S 28°15′E
- Area: 11,595 ha (28,650 acres)
- Established: 27 March 1974
- Operator: Gauteng Department of Agriculture, Conservation, Environment and Land Affairs
- Website: Gauteng Tourism Authority

Suikerbosrand Nature Reserve is a protected area which encompasses most of the Suikerbosrand Range, South Africa. It is one of Gauteng's most frequented ecotourism locations, located approximately 50 kilometres south-east of Johannesburg, just west of the town of Heidelberg in the upper catchment of the Klip and Suikerbosrand rivers. The altitude varies between 1,545 and 1,917 m (5,069 and 6,289 ft) above sea level.

The reserve, which is 134 km^{2} (52 sq mi), hosts a representative sample of the fauna and flora of the rocky highveld grassland biome. Its boundaries include hiking trails, and tarred circular route for motorists.

== History ==
The Suikerbosrand ridge was originally named after a sweet reed (probably sweet sorghum) found growing here by the party of general Hendrik Potgieter on 5 June 1836. Later the ridge and consequently the reserve's name became associated with the characteristic Transvaal-sugar bush (Protea afra), a dominant vegetation type within the area's limits.

Recent land acquisitions at the beginning of the twenty-first century have seen the reserve almost double in its size. A huge challenge for the reserve's management is to include the newly acquired lands in the reserve without disturbing the balance within the original area. The Suikerbosrand Nature Reserve is managed by the Gauteng province's Department of Agriculture, Conservation, Environment and Land Affairs, South Africa.

== Wildlife ==
Over 200 bird species have been identified in the reserve. The reserve is also a habitat for a large range of mammal species including the animals listed below.

- Aardvark
- Aardwolf
- Black-backed jackal
- Black wildebeest
- Blesbok
- Brown hyena
- Cape fox
- Chacma baboon
- Common duiker
- Common eland
- Common reedbuck
- Grey rhebuck
- Kudu
- Mountain reedbuck
- Oribi
- Porcupine
- Red hartebeest
- Small-spotted genet
- Springbok
- Steenbok
- Zebra
- Pseudocordylus melanotus
- Cordylus vittifer

== Cycling and mountain biking ==
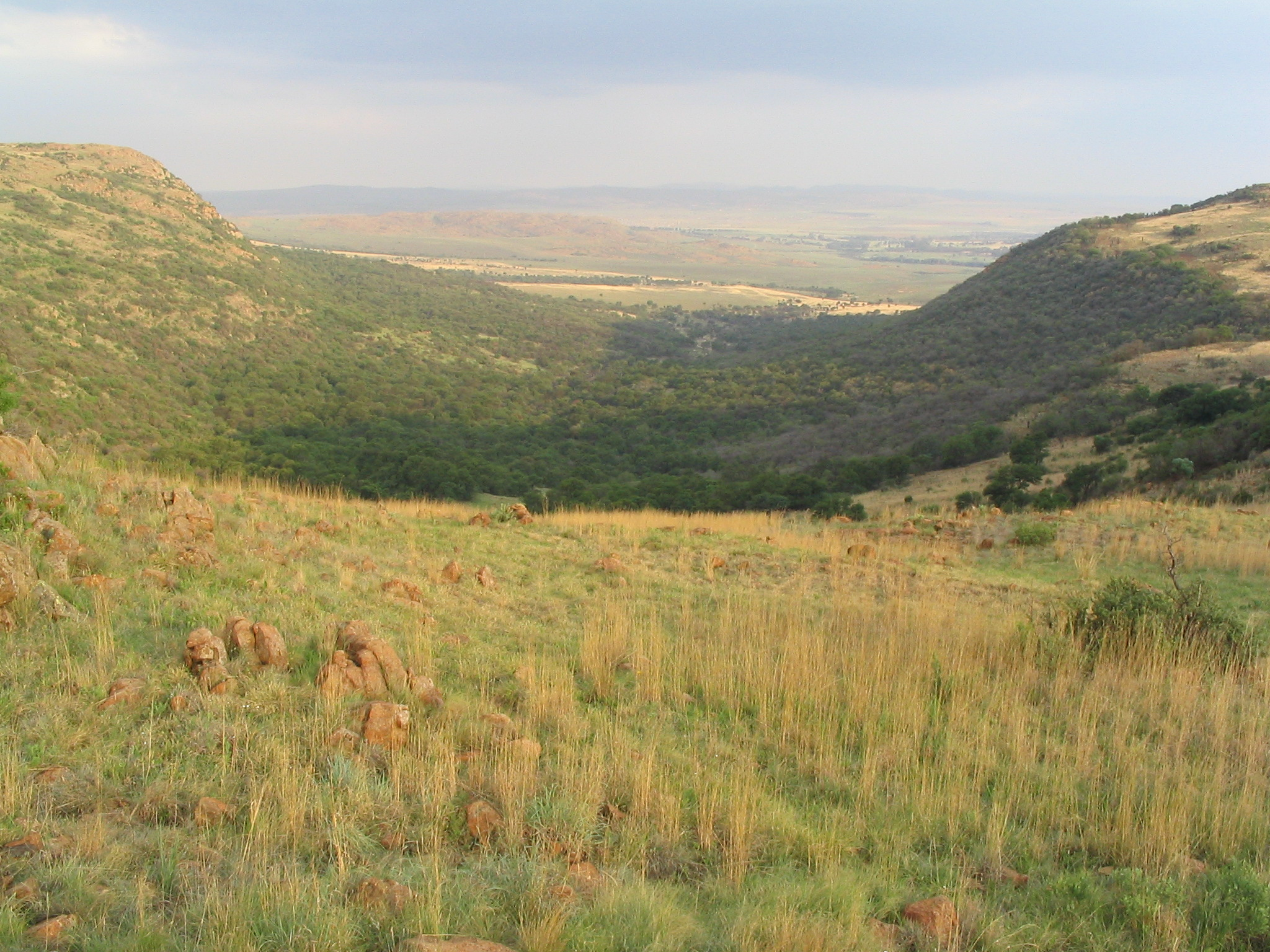
A valley in Suikerbosrand Nature Reserve

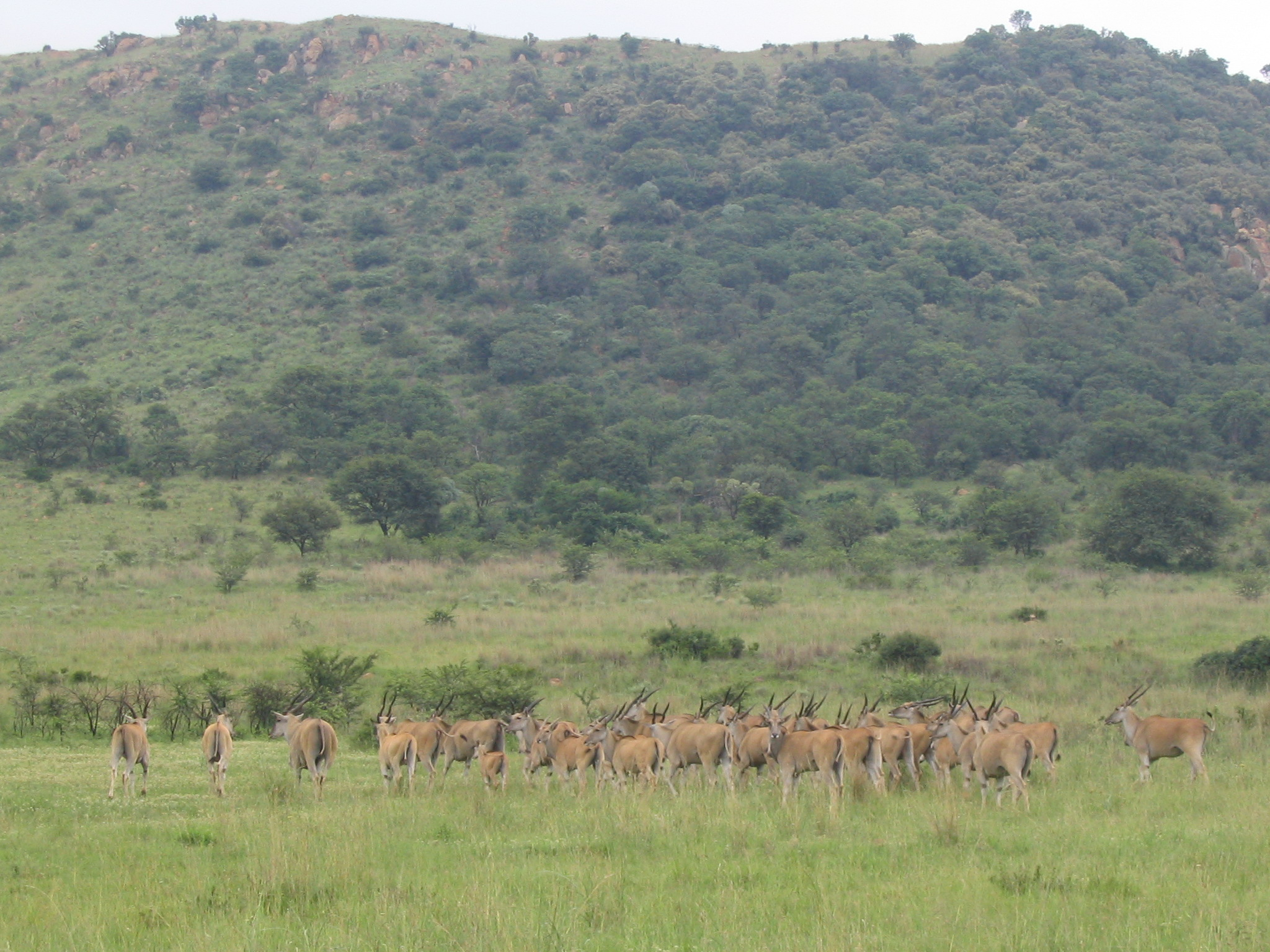
A herd of common eland at Suikerbosrand Nature Reserve

The reserve is popular amongst mountain bikers and road cyclists for its quiet roads and trails, scenery, steep climbs, and fast twisting descents.

== Hiking ==
The reserve includes a Visitors' Centre and the Diepkloof Farm Museum. The area is available on foot and contains several day and overnight hiking trails.

== Holiday resort ==
A holiday resort for day visitors (apparently day visitors are no longer allowed in at Kareekloof) and overnight campers is situated within the nature reserve. (It was previously known as Kareekloof)

Accommodation is in the form of chalets, caravan (some with 240 V power) and tent sites.

== See also ==
- Protected areas of South Africa
