= Three Rivers Proper =

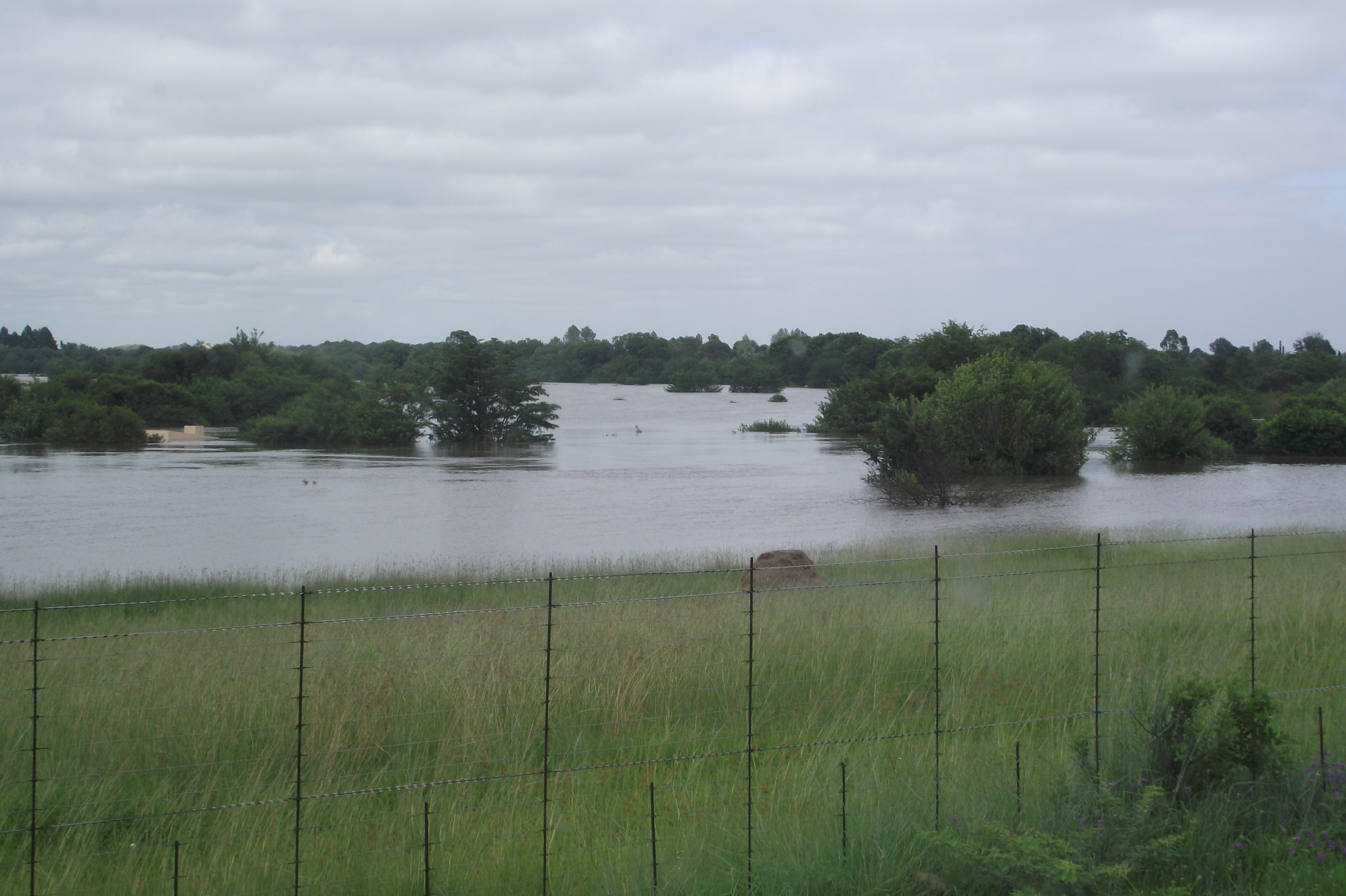
- Flooding along Sugarbush Drive, Three Rivers Proper

- Location within Gauteng Location within South Africa
- Coordinates: 26.664°S 27.972°E
- Country: South Africa
- Province: Gauteng
- District: Sedibeng
- Municipality: Emfuleni
- Main Place: Vereeniging

Area
  - Total: 3.09 km^{2} (1.19 sq mi)

Population (2011)
  - Total: 2,547
  - Density: 824/km^{2} (2,130/sq mi)

Racial makeup (2011)
  - Black African: 21.9%
  - Coloured: 0.7%
  - Indian/Asian: 0.5%
  - White: 76.2%
  - Other: 0.7%

First languages (2011)
  - Afrikaans: 58.5%
  - English: 23.1%
  - Sotho: 9.0%
  - Zulu: 3.9%
  - Other: 5.4%
- Time zone: UTC+2 (SAST)

Three Rivers Proper is a suburb of Vereeniging, Gauteng, South Africa.

The suburb is bordered by Three Rivers East to the east and Three Rivers North to the north. Its northern boundary is formed by the R42 (General Hertzog Road), its western border is formed by the Klip River and its southern border is formed by the Sugarbush River and the Vaal River.

Many of Vereeniging's wealthiest families live here, and together with Three Rivers East contribute to the majority of the tax income by local municipality. Many of its most notable properties lie on the banks of the Sugarbush and Vaal Rivers and have been home to many public figures, including F.W. de Klerk.

The regional River Square Shopping mall is located in Three Rivers Proper and it is also home to Milton Primary School and the Midvaal Private Hospital.
