= Vereeniging =

- City
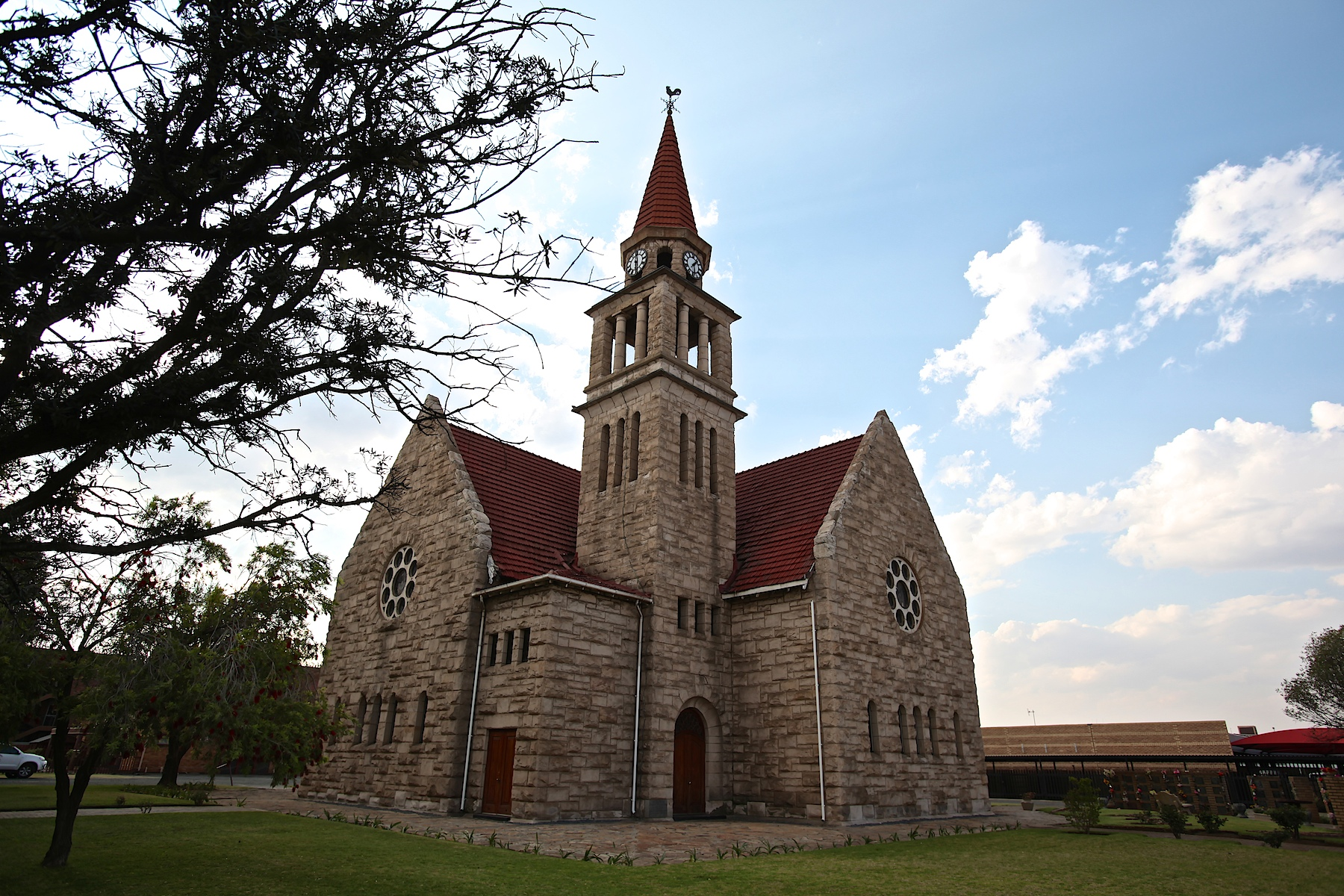
- Dutch Reformed Church, Vereeniging

- Coat of arms
- Motto: Per Pacem Ad Industriam ("From peace to industry")
- Location within Gauteng Location within South Africa Location within Africa
- Coordinates: 26°40′25″S 27°55′55″E
- Country: South Africa
- Province: Gauteng
- District: Sedibeng
- Municipality: Emfuleni
- Established: 1892

Area
  - Total: 188.19 km^{2} (72.66 sq mi)
- Elevation: 1,479 m (4,852 ft)

Population (2020)
  - Total: 99,000
  - Density: 530/km^{2} (1,400/sq mi)

Racial makeup (2011)
  - Black African: 55.0%
  - Coloured: 5.1%
  - Indian/Asian: 5.8%
  - White: 33.1%
  - Other: 1.0%

First languages (2011)
  - Afrikaans: 34.9%
  - Sotho: 26.2%
  - English: 15.5%
  - Zulu: 8.3%
  - Other: 15.2%
- Time zone: UTC+2 (SAST)
- Postal code (street): 1930
- PO box: 1939
- Area code: 016

Vereeniging (locally /fəˈrɪərnəxəŋ/ fə-REER-nə-khəng; Afrikaans pronunciation: [fəˈriənəχəŋ]) is a city located in the south of Gauteng province, South Africa, situated where the Klip River empties into the northern loop of the Vaal River. It is also one of the constituent parts of the Vaal Triangle region and was formerly situated in the Transvaal province. The name Vereeniging is the Dutch word meaning "association", although the spelling has since changed to vereniging, with a single e.

== Geographical information ==
Vereeniging is situated in the southern part of Gauteng Province, and forms the southern portion of the Pretoria-Witwatersrand-Vereeninging (PWV) conurbation, and its neighbors are Vanderbijlpark (to the west), Three Rivers (east), Meyerton (north) and Sasolburg (south). The city is currently one of the most important industrial manufacturing centres in South Africa, with its chief products being iron, steel, pipes, bricks, tiles and processed lime.

The predominant language in Vereeniging is English followed closely by Sesotho language and Afrikaans.

== History ==
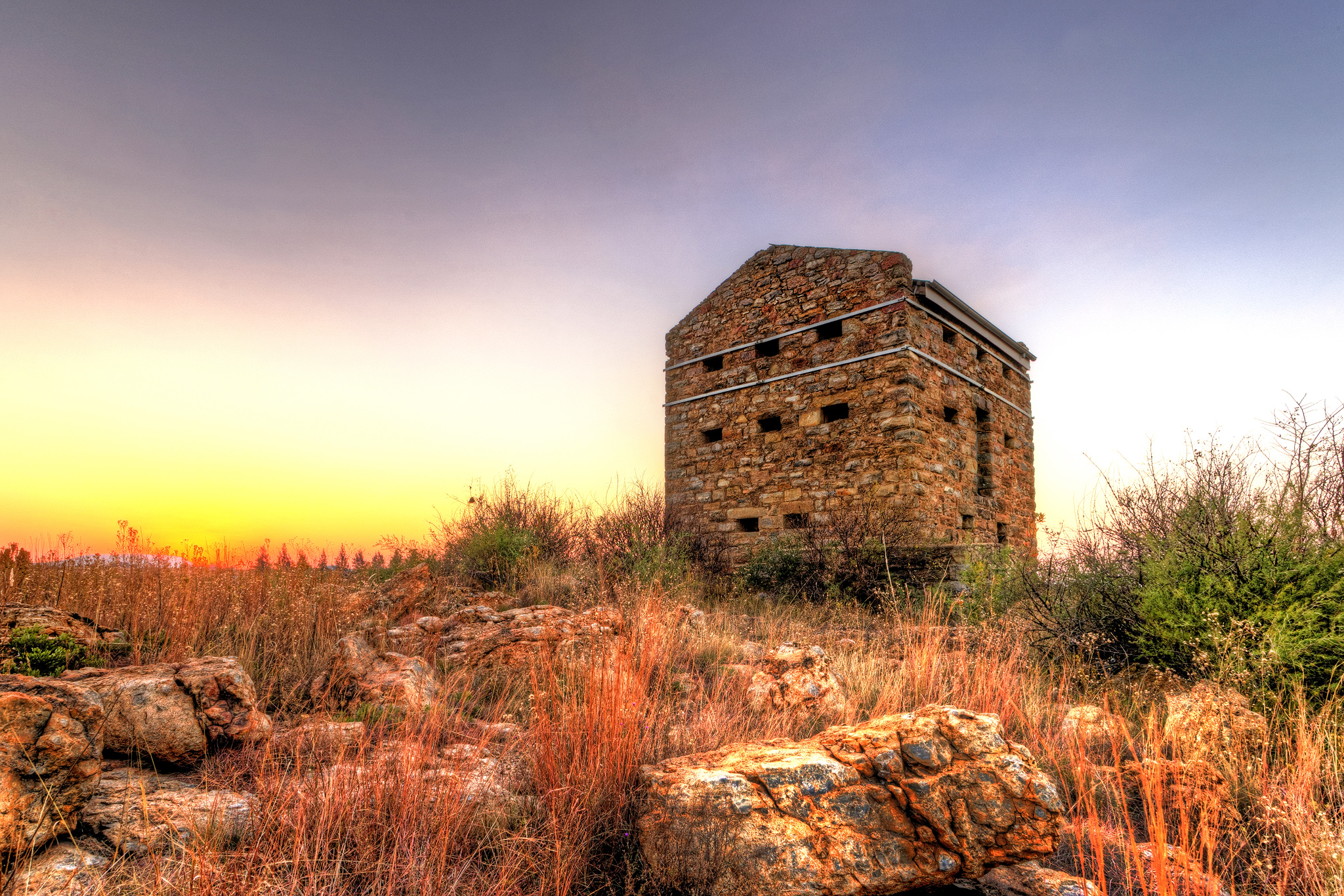
The blockhouse in Vereeniging built by the British during the Second Boer War.

In 1879, George William Stow was commissioned by the Orange Free State government to look for coal deposits in the Bethlehem district With no deposits found he moved northwards to Maccauvlei on the Vaal River and then crossed the river to the Transvaal side. On the farm Leeuwkuil, he found a coal deposit twelve feet thick. But the Orange Free State government believed that the deposit was too far away and there was a lack of transport so turned down the idea of mining there.

Stow settled in Kimberley to find a job, where he met Samuel Marks. After hearing Stow's story, Marks saw an opportunity to use the coal for energy generation at the Kimberley diamond fields. Marks formed De Zuid Afrikaanshe en Oranje Vrystaatsche Kolen and Mineralen Vereeniging (The South African and Orange Free State Coal and Mineral Association) and sent Stow to purchase the farms where the coal was found. On 25 November 1880 he purchased the 12,000 acre farm Leeuwkuil for £5,000. Marks' agent J.G. Fraser also purchased the 6,000 acre Klipplaatdrift farm from Karl August Pistorius in October 1881 for £15,500. This was opposite the farm Maccauvlei.

From 1881, coal was taken by ox-wagon to Kimberley, and by 1882 there was so much development around the mining area that a village was surveyed on the two former farms. The Volksraad agreed to name it Vereeniging, a shortened version of the company's name.

=== Second Boer War ===
The Treaty of Vereeniging ending the Second Boer War (1899–1902) was negotiated here by delegates of the South African Republic, the Orange Free State, and the British Empire. During the conflict, a concentration camp was set up in the area by the British in September 1900, and by October 1901 it housed 185 men, 330 women, and 452 children. Conditions at the camp were very poor: drinking water was brought by cart from a fountain (there was no direct water supply although it was situated next to the Vaal River) and there were only 24 latrines. Most inmates lived in bell-tents but there was a dispensary and a school.

The concentration camp was situated where the Mittal Steel plant (Vaal Works) is situated. Today, the Maccauvlei Golf Course is on the opposite side of the Vaal River to where the concentration camp was, and a Garden of Remembrance is situated at Maccauvlei. All the British soldiers killed in and around Vereeniging during the war were re-buried on this site.

=== Post-Apartheid ===
Since 1999 its municipal services were provided by the Emfuleni Local Municipality. In 2018 the municipality was placed under administration after years of wasteful practices and poor service delivery. In February 2022 it was reported that Vereeniging had 14 out-of-service police vehicles for visible policing, and only 20 operational vehicles.

=== Flooding 2011 ===
In December 2010 and January 2011 the southern part of Gauteng and Mpumulanga experienced a higher than normal rainfall. This resulted in the need to release more water from the nearby Vaal dam. As a consequence, parts of Vereeniging, Three Rivers and the rest of the towns downstream were flooded.

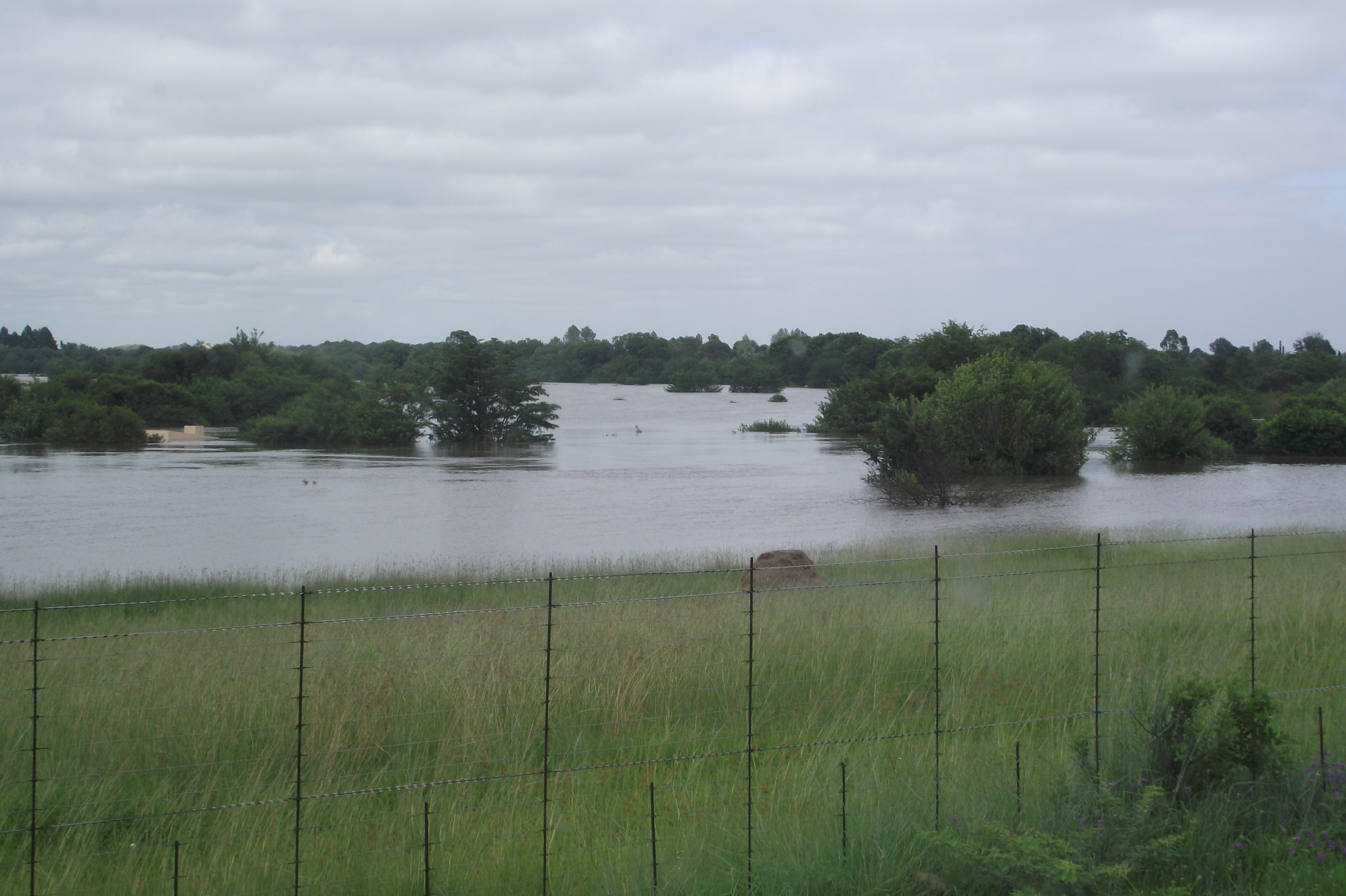
Flooding along Sugarbush Drive, Three Rivers Proper

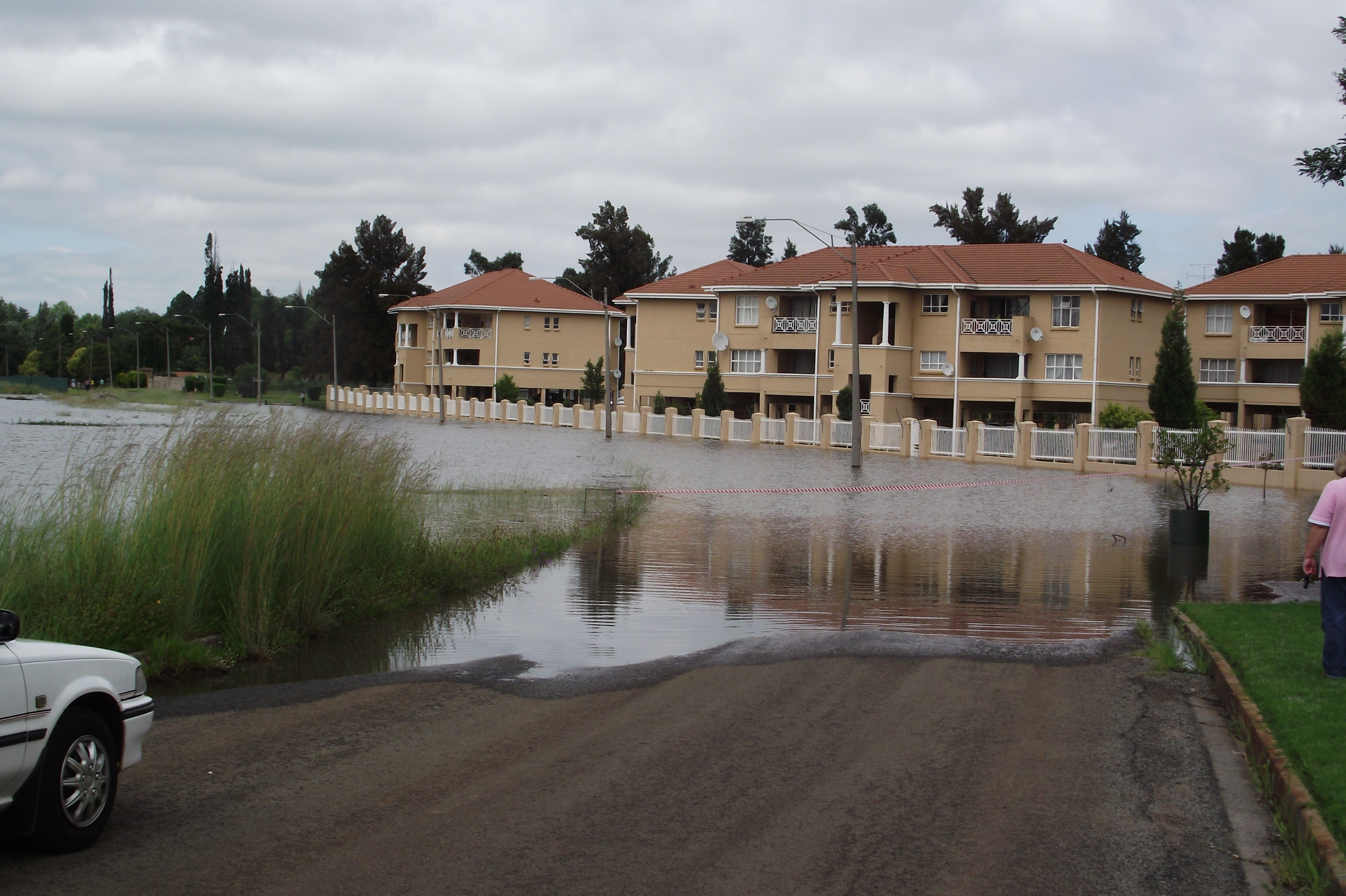
Brandmuller Avenue in Three Rivers Proper

== Trade and industry ==
The city's motto is Per Pacem ad Industriam (Through Peace to Industry). It is currently one of the most important industrial manufacturing centres in South Africa, with its chief products being iron, steel, pipes, bricks, tiles and processed lime. Several coal mines are also still situated in the area, with reserves being estimated at four billion tons. Other mines nearby extract fire-clay, silica and building stone. Vereeniging also has several Eskom thermal power plants that supply electricity to the nearby goldmines.

== Suburbs and municipality ==
In the census of 2001 the population of Vereeniging was recorded as 73,283.

Vereeniging consists of 21 suburbs:

- Arcon Park
- Bedworth Park
- Dickensonville
- Duncanville
- Falcon Ridge
- Homer
- Leeuhof
- Peacehaven
- Powerville
- Randwater
- Roodt's Gardens
- Roshnee
- Sonland Park
- Spider Valley
- Springcol
- Steel Park
- Three Rivers Proper
- Three Rivers East
- Unitas Park
- Vereeniging Central
- Waldrift

Since 1999, Vereeniging has been part of the Emfuleni Local Municipality, along with Vanderbijlpark, Sharpeville and Sebokeng.

== Healthcare ==
Various health services are available in Vereeniging. The majority of these services are located in or near the major medical centres. These include:

- Vereeniging Medi-Clinic
- Kopanong Hospital
- Naledi-Nkanyezi Hospital
- Midvaal Private Hospital
- Market-Avenue clinic

== Education ==
- Vereeniging Gimnasium (Afrikaans medium - Amalgamation of Hoërskool Vereeniging and Hoër Tegniese Skool Vereeniging)
- Handhawer Laerskool (Afrikaans and English medium)
- Selborne Primary School (English medium)
- General Smuts High School (English medium)
- Arcon Park Primary School (English medium)
- Unitaspark Laerskool (Afrikaans and English medium)
- Vryheidsmonument Laerskool (Afrikaans medium)
- Overvaal Hoërskool (Afrikaans medium)
- Sonland Park Primary School (English medium)
- Phoenix High School (English medium)
- Roshnee Islamic School (English medium)
- Word of Life School (English medium - CIE)
- Krugerlaan School (Afrikaans and English medium - LSEN School) in

=== Tertiary institutions ===
Campuses of:

- University of South Africa
- Damelin College
- CTU Training Solutions
- Sedibeng College
- Boston City Campus
- It is also close to the North-West University's Vaal Triangle Campus, and the Vaal University of Technology in Vanderbijlpark.

== Infrastructure ==
=== Road ===
The R59 (Sybrand van Niekerk Freeway) passes through the western suburbs, connecting Vereeniging with Sasolburg and Parys to the south-west and with Meyerton, Alberton and Johannesburg to the north. The R82 passes through the Vereeniging city centre, connecting the city with Johannesburg to the north and with Sasolburg and Koppies to the south. The R42 connects Vereeniging with Vanderbijlpark to the south-west and Heidelberg to the north-east. The R54 connects Vereeniging with Potchefstroom to the west and with Villiers to the south-east. The R28 connects Vereeniging with Evaton and Randfontein to the north-west.

== Notable residents ==
- Gerald Bosch, played fly-half for The Springboks 1974–1976
- Bles Bridges, an Afrikaans country singer, stayed in Vereeniging until his death in 2000.
- F.W. de Klerk was first elected to the South African parliament in 1969 as the member for Vereeniging.
- Francois Pienaar, Springboks rugby player.
- Charl Schwartzel (the 2011 US Masters champion).
- Tertius Bosch, Morné Morkel and Albie Morkel Protea cricket players attended Vereeniging High.
- Leon Schuster, actor, comedian, filmmaker, presenter and singer.
- Deon Dreyer, a cave diver who perished in Bushman's Hole in 1994, was raised in Vereeniging.
- Pieter Aldrich, a South African professional tennis player.

== Crime ==
The latest annual crime statistics for Vereeniging Police Precinct was issued by the South African Police Service (SAPS) in 2021. The SAPS crime report showed the following information:

Type of crime	2018/2019	2019/2020	2020/2021
Murder	23	16	12
Sexual Offences	86	47	61
Assault with the intent to inflict grievous bodily harm	195	162	118
Burglary at non-residential premises	311	254	190
Burglary at residential premises	608	536	403
Theft of motor vehicle and motorcycle	361	224	148
Carjacking	29	53	44

== Coat of arms ==
Vereeniging coat of arms (1955)

Vereeniging established a municipality in 1912. By 1931, the town council had assumed an emblem depicting bridge across a river, and two clasped hands.

The town council obtained a coat of arms from the College of Arms in October 1955, registered it with the Transvaal Provincial Administration in October 1957 and with the Bureau of Heraldry in June 1987.

The arms were : Sable, on a fess wavy Or a barrulet wavy Tenne, the fess between in chief a thunderbolt between two picks, Or, and in base a steel pipe palewise proper between two cogwheels, also Or. In layman's terms, the design is a black shield displaying, from top to bottom, a golden heraldic thunderbolt between two picks, a wavy orange stripe edged in gold, and an upright golden pipe between two cogwheels.

The crest was a dove of peace perched on two clasped hands; the supporters were a lion and a zebra standing on a grassy base strewn with veld flowers; and the motto was Per pacem ad industriam.
