= Kanana Park =

- Location within Gauteng Location within South Africa
- Coordinates: 26°24′18.7″S 27°54′7.9″E
- Country: South Africa
- Province: Gauteng
- Municipality: City of Johannesburg

Area
  - Total: 6.82 km^{2} (2.63 sq mi)

Population (2011)
  - Total: 21,005
  - Density: 3,080/km^{2} (7,980/sq mi)

Racial makeup (2011)
  - Black African: 98.3%
  - Coloured: 0.6%
  - Indian/Asian: 0.1%
  - White: 0.1%
  - Other: 0.9%

First languages (2011)
  - Zulu: 35.8%
  - Xhosa: 22.6%
  - Sotho: 20.3%
  - Tsonga: 5.6%
  - Other: 15.7%
- Time zone: UTC+2 (SAST)

Kanana Park is a suburb of Johannesburg, South Africa. It is located in Region G of the City of Johannesburg Metropolitan Municipality.
