= Sebokeng =

- Location within Gauteng Location within South Africa Location within Africa
- Coordinates: 26°34′37″S 27°50′26″E
- Country: South Africa
- Province: Gauteng
- District: Sedibeng
- Municipality: Emfuleni

Area
  - Total: 46.45 km^{2} (17.93 sq mi)

Population (2011)
  - Total: 218,515
  - Density: 4,704/km^{2} (12,180/sq mi)

Racial makeup (2011)
  - Black African: 99.1%
  - Coloured: 0.4%
  - Indian/Asian: 0.1%
  - White: 0.1%
  - Other: 0.3%

First languages (2011)
  - Sotho: 64.6%
  - Zulu: 14.7%
  - Xhosa: 10.3%
  - Tswana: 2.2%
  - Other: 8.2%
- Time zone: UTC+2 (SAST)
- Postal code (street): 1983
- PO box: 1982
- Area code: 016

Sebokeng (/ˌsəboʊˈkɛŋ/), locally called Zweni by residents, is a middle-class township in the Emfuleni Local Municipality in southern Gauteng, South Africa near the industrial cities of Vanderbijlpark and Vereeniging. Other neighboring townships include Evaton to the north and Sharpeville to the south.

== History ==
Sebokeng, which literally means "gathering place" in Sesotho, was established by the then apartheid government in 1965 when 18,772 houses were erected. In September 1984 there were violent clashes between the South African security forces and the residents of Sebokeng, who were boycotting rent and service tariffs. The cessation of fighting in 1994 allowed citizens to begin forming a stable community.

== Demographics ==
The township is divided into a number of zones ranging from Zone 3 to Zone 24, not forgetting the hostel residence towards the outskirts of the townships when entering from the South coming from Vanderbijl. After South Africa's democratic elections in 1994, the number of middle-class black South Africans or 'black diamonds' in this township has risen dramatically, with Zones such as Zone 6, 10, and 14 consisting of the largest number of black middle-class citizens and homes with a higher property value than traditional Apartheid 'matchbox houses' (four-roomed houses erected during the township's establishment).

The township is predominantly black, but there has been an influx of people of other racial groups seeking to live there.

== Economy ==
Many of the residents of Sebokeng have opted to using entrepreneurship as a means of earning an income since 1994; before then entrepreneurship was strongly discouraged by the Apartheid government and black men were preferred to work in the neighboring suburbs of Vereeniging, Vanderbijlpark and Meyerton as cleaners, garden workers, delivery boys, etc. The types of businesses run by residents range from formal businesses such as beauty shops, pubs, petrol garages and night clubs to informal, usually home-based businesses such as spaza shops, hair salons and shebeens.

In 2002, Sebokeng's first Plaza, Sebokeng Plaza was opened to serve and employ the residents of Sebokeng and neighbouring townships and in 2009 they built another plaza which is Thabong, which was later upgraded to a Mall, not forgetting Mandela Square towards the North, which also created jobs for local residents.

== Infrastructure ==
Developments to upgrade the railway station near Zone 10 began in 2010 and are still underway. Many roads in Sebokeng have deteriorated and remained untarred for more than 30 years. Developments to re-tar many of these road began in 2009, but have been stalled due to tender disputes. Many of the roads of Sebokeng were left unnamed by the Apartheid-era municipality and thus 7-digit house numbers are depended on for navigation through residential areas. The longest main roads of Sebokeng are Moshoeshoe Rd (named after the Sotho king, Moshoeshoe) and Adams Rd in Evaton.

== Education ==
The township has two tertiary institutions, a FET College, Sedibeng, and Vaal University of Technology's Sebokeng campus, which is regarded a privilege as townships hardly have access to tertiary institutions in the Vaal, in actual fact Sebokeng is the only township that is exposed to tertiary education. The Vaal Triangle's D8 education district offices are in Zone 18 next to Residentia High.

Primary and Secondary schools in Sebokeng teach in Sesotho and Zulu, to a lesser extent isiXhosa home languages and English FAL (First Additional Language) and are all over the townships ensuring that the younger population of Sebokeng have access to education.

== Neighbouring townships ==
Neighbouring townships include Boiketlong, Evaton, Sharpeville, Tshepiso, Beverley Hills, Orange Farm, Bophelong, Tshirela, Muvango, Kanana, Seroepe Sa Benya, Mkhelele, Small Farms, Tshepong, Boitumelo, Polokong, Golden Gardens, and Lakeside.
