= Parys =

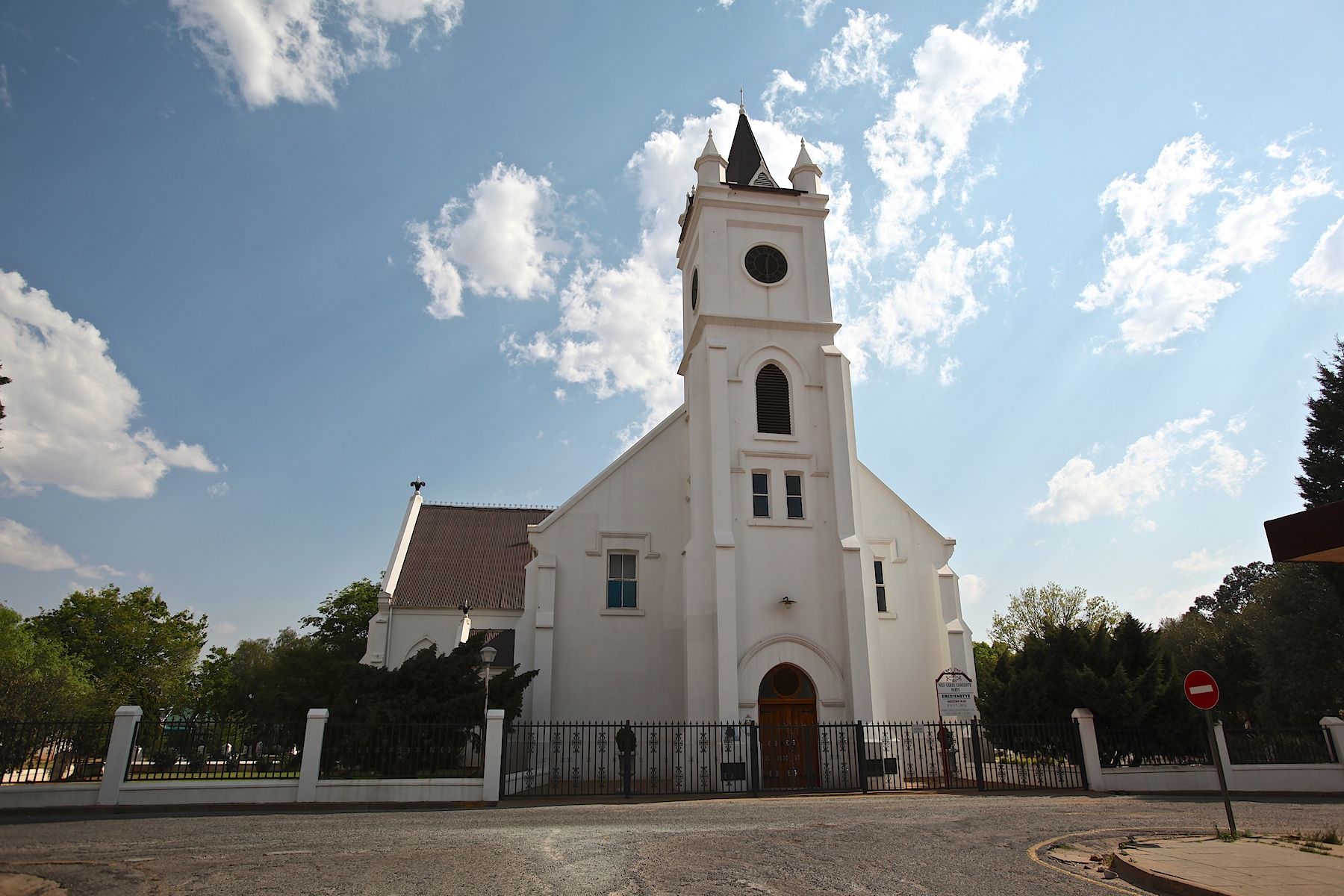
- Nederduitse Gereformeerde Mother Church, Hefer Street, Parys

- Location within Free State (South African province) Location within South Africa
- Coordinates: 26°54′S 27°27′E
- Country: South Africa
- Province: Free State
- District: Fezile Dabi
- Municipality: Ngwathe
- Established: 1882

Area
  - Total: 23.3 km^{2} (9.0 sq mi)

Population (2022)
  - Total: 45,868
  - Density: 1,970/km^{2} (5,100/sq mi)

Racial makeup (2011)
  - White: 84.4%
  - Black African: 13.2%
  - Coloured: 1.3%
  - Indian/Asian: 0.7%
  - Other: 0.4%

First languages (2011)
  - Afrikaans: 84.7%
  - English: 6.9%
  - Sotho: 5.1%
  - Xhosa: 1.0%
  - Other: 2.3%
- Time zone: UTC+2 (SAST)
- Postal code (street): 9585
- PO box: 9585
- Area code: 056
- Website: www.parys.co.za

Parys (pronounced /ˈpɑːreɪs/) is a resort town in northern Free State province, South Africa. It is situated on the southern bank of the Vaal River. The name is the Afrikaans translation of Paris. The origin of the name 'Parys' is attributed to German surveyor Schilbach, who named it after the city of Paris because of the similarity between its location next to the Vaal River and that of Paris on the River Seine. The area of Parys also includes the two townships of Tumahole and Schonkenville.

== History ==
In the early 1870s, towns in the Northern Free State were situated very far apart, and members of different churches had to travel great distances to participate in religious services. It was then decided by the Ring of the Dutch Reformed Church to implant the idea of a congregation north of the Rhenoster River into the minds of the residents of the farm Klipspruit, on the Vaal River, which was owned by four van Coller brothers.

Three gentlemen, Messrs. De Villiers, Luyt and Fleck were sent to the owners of Klipspruit to induce them to lay the farm out as a township, but the Van Coller brothers were very reluctant to listen to the arguments put forward by the three men. Not giving up hope of laying out a township, the three gentlemen went to the adjoining farm, Vischgat (the present Vredefort). The owners of Vischgat were more amenable to argument and inducement, and it was not long before the township Vredefort was born. The owners of Klipspruit soon awoke to the fact that a golden opportunity had slipped through their fingers and set out in haste to retrieve matters. History does not record the steps they took, but it seems probable that they secured the sympathy of the Dutch Reformed Church, for, later on in 1876 when the town was laid out, a goodly portion of ground was set aside and donated to the church. On the 14 th of June 1876 the first sale of seven erven was held by a Mr. Wouter de Villiers, and the upset price of the erven was 25 pounds each.

=== 20th century ===
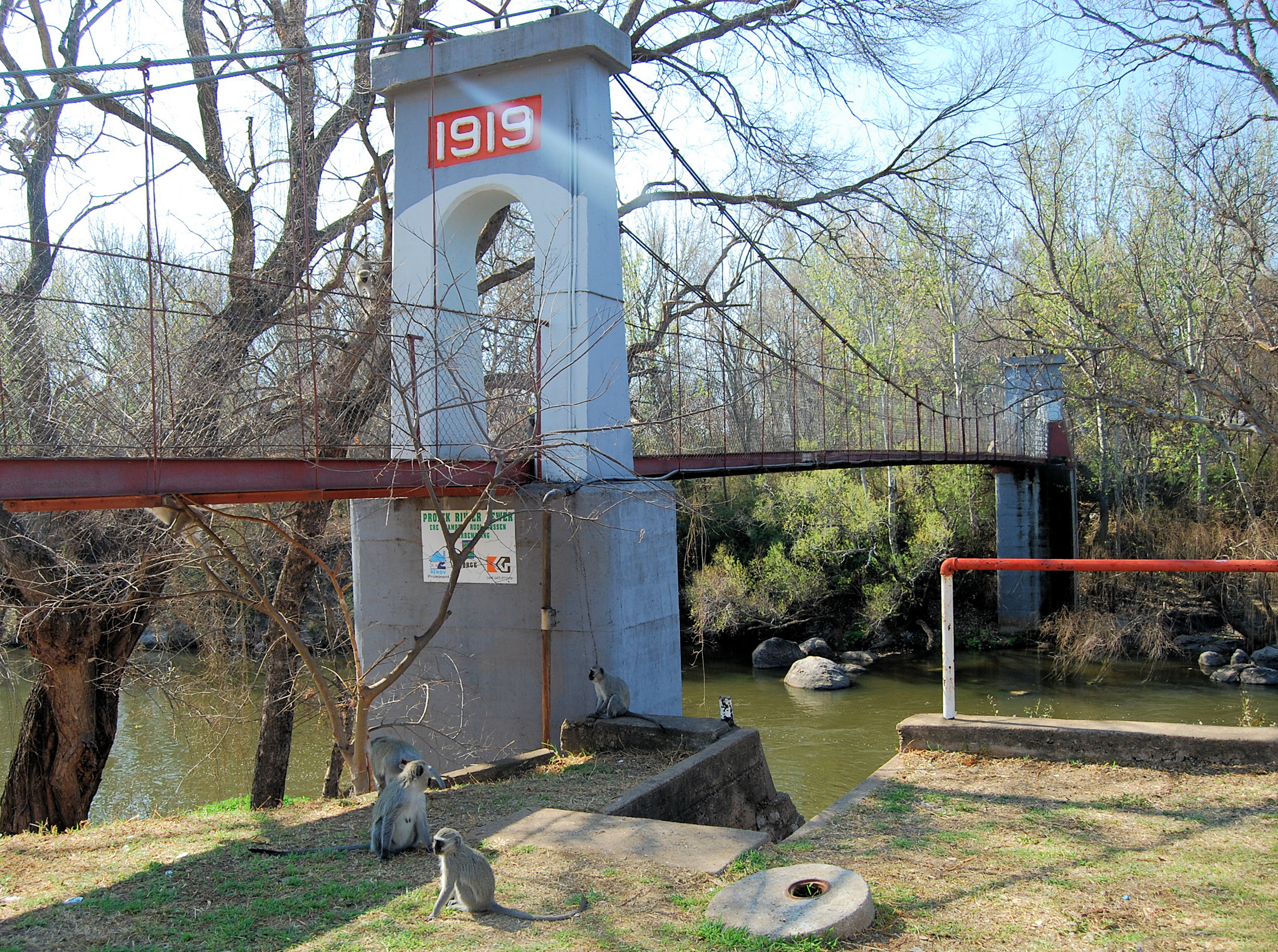
The Parys Suspension Bridge (built in 1919) leads across the Vaal River to one of the numerous islands on the river.

The completion of the railway sideline to Parys in 1905 meant that Parys had suddenly become more accessible to the public, and this led to the growth of the town as a holiday resort and industrial centre. The town was now being marketed as The Pride of the Vaal," and city dwellers flocked by train to the lush green riverbanks and special swimming facilities and accommodations provided by the Village Management Board at the time. Bungalows were built on Woody Island and were serviced by the Woody Island Ferry. Unfortunately, this venture did not last very long because of the inaccessibility of the island during the flood periods. By now, residents of the town had felt for quite some time that a bridge across the Vaal River was justly due. The Woody Island, Ferry Service crossed on to Woody Island and from there another ferry completed the crossing. The service was infrequent, and accidents happened frequently. Farmers on the Transvaal side even preferred to go to Potchefstroom, 48 kilometres (30 mi) away, rather than face the expense of the ferry crossings. Towards the end of 1913, tenders were requested for a reinforced concrete bridge over the Vaal. The project began in May 1914. The outbreak of the First World War three months later caused long delays, and the bridge was only finished and opened for traffic around Christmas 1915. Because of the bridge over the Vaal, trade grew, and Parys was a new market for farmers from the then-Transvaal side. Many new buildings were built as more and more traffic ran through the town.

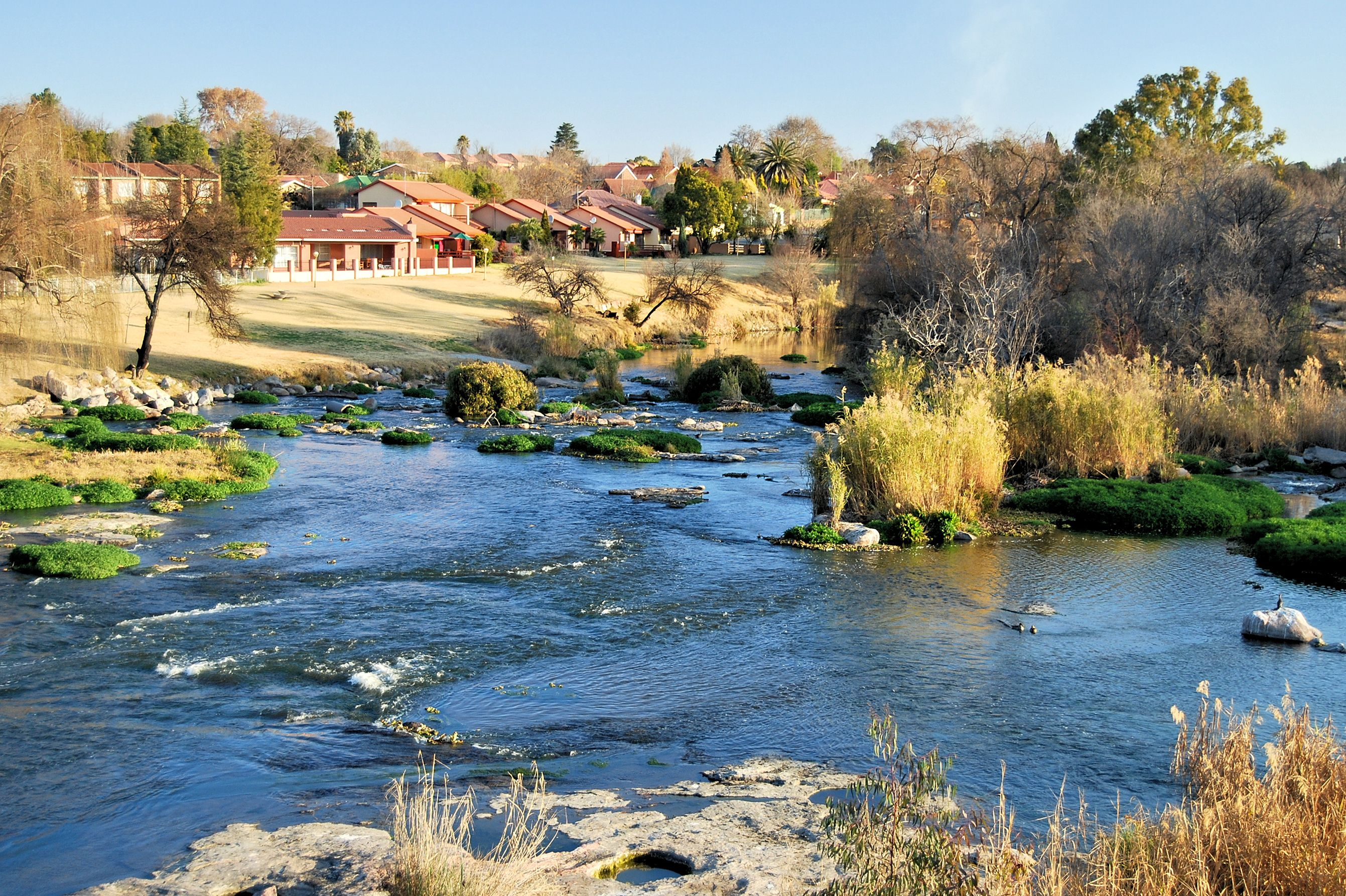
The West End suburb of Parys on the south bank of the Vaal River

Few of the original buildings and historic places remain today. The current Parys Palm Court Hotel is one of the surviving turn-of-the century buildings, as are the museum (once the magistrate's office) and "Moedergemeente" Church in the centre of town. There are, however, a few original old houses remaining. Industries that have come and gone are the Orange River Canning Company, Parys Basket Works, which used a special willow planted on the riverbanks, a jam factory, a boat building factory, a cold drink factory, and the Parys Roller Milling Company. By the middle 1950s, big industries like ARWA, BASA (a nuts-and-bolts factory), Vaalrivierse Tabakkooperasie, Vetsak (an agricultural co-op that was founded in Parys), and Metro Clothing Company had settled in the industrial area of Parys. Only a handful of industries remain today, and like in the early days, the town is becoming increasingly popular as a weekend and holiday destination for people wanting to escape the pressures of city life.

== Notable citizens ==
- Springboks great Frik du Preez, named South Africa's rugby player of the 20th century, was educated at Parys High School, although he was born in Rustenburg.
- Gary Anderson was born in Parys.
- Former Premier of the Free State Province and former Secretary General of the African Nation Congress, Ace Magashule.
- Stompie Seipei was a freedom fighter during the late apartheid era from the age of only 10 years, becoming the country's youngest political detainee when he spent his 12th birthday in jail without trial. Seipei was kidnapped on December 29, 1988, by the Mandela United Football Club, who were Winnie Mandela's bodyguards. He was accused of being a police informant by the group. He was murdered on January 1, 1989. Manankie Seipei, his mother, who still lives in Tumahole, identified her son's remains. In 1991, Winnie Mandela was convicted of kidnapping, but her sentence of six years in jail was reduced to a fine and two years suspended. The Truth and Reconciliation Commission found her guilty of initiating and participating in the assaults, but regarding the actual murder of Stompie, she was only found “negligent”. Winnie Mandela apologised in person to his mother, and the two men accused of killing Stompie also apologized on national television.
