= Emfuleni Local Municipality =

Emfuleni
- Local municipality
- Seal

- Location of Emfuleni Local Municipality within Gauteng
- Coordinates: 26°40′S 27°45′E
- Country: South Africa
- Province: Gauteng
- District: Sedibeng
- Seat: Vanderbijlpark
- Wards: 45

Government
  - Type: Municipal council
  - Mayor: Sipho Radebe (ANC)

Area
  - Total: 966 km^{2} (373 sq mi)

Population (2011)
  - Total: 721,663
  - Density: 747/km^{2} (1,930/sq mi)

Racial makeup (2011)
  - Black African: 85.4%
  - Coloured: 1.2%
  - Indian/Asian: 1.0%
  - White: 12.0%

First languages (2011)
  - Sotho: 52.5%
  - Zulu: 13.1%
  - Afrikaans: 12.5%
  - Xhosa: 7.8%
  - Other: 14.1%
- Time zone: UTC+2 (SAST)
- Municipal code: GT421

Emfuleni Municipality (Sotho: Masepala wa Emfuleni; Zulu: UMasipala wase Mfuleni; Afrikaans: Emfuleni Munisipaliteit) is a local municipality within the Sedibeng District Municipality, in the Gauteng province of South Africa. It is the westernmost local municipality in the district, and covers an area of 987 km^{2} at the heart of the Vaal Triangle. It is located in the former industrial heartland of Gauteng which created employment and wealth for Sebokeng, Vanderbijlpark, Vereeniging, Three Rivers and Sharpeville. Its head offices are located at the corner of Klasie Havenga St and Frikkie Meyer Blvd, Vanderbijlpark. The municipality was founded in 1999.

Emfuleni has been experiencing a financial crisis since 2018, and as of 2020 is considered a "broken" municipality which has lost the ability to rectify or recover from its many failed enterprises. It has been plagued by service delivery protests, and in 2020 its residents started a #EmfuleniMustFall campaign on social media due to its inconsistent or completely lacking waste removal, collapse of the electricity distribution network, ineffective provision of water and sanitation and its failure to maintain its road infrastructure. Jacob Khawe replaced Simon Mofokeng as mayor in 2018 and acknowledged wasteful practices. He declared his commitment to a turnaround, but resigned six months later when the municipality was placed under semi-administration. Lucky Leaseane replaced Oupa Nkoane as municipal manager in February 2020, but was dismissed in September 2020.

== Local history ==
The Emfuleni Local Municipality is rich in history: it encapsulates the Anglo-Boer War, the Sharpeville Massacre of 1960, and the 1996 signing of the Constitution of South Africa in Sharpeville.

== Location ==
It shares boundaries with Metsimaholo Local Municipality in the Free State to the south, Midvaal Local Municipality to the east, the City of Johannesburg Metropolitan Municipality to the north and the Rand West City and Tlokwe local municipalities to the west. The municipality is strategically located with access to a well-maintained road network, including the N1 national route. The Vaal River forms the southern boundary of the municipality; its strategic location affords it many opportunities for tourism and other forms of economic development.

== Urban centres and industry ==
Emfuleni is a largely urbanised municipality, with a high population density compared to other municipalities making up the Sedibeng District. In fact, the municipality houses around 80% of the district's total population. The municipality forms the heartland of what was formerly known as the Vaal Triangle, renowned for its contribution to the iron and steel industry in South Africa. The two main town centres are Vereeniging and Vanderbijlpark. Sasolburg is 10 kilometers to the south, across the provincial boundary.

There are a number of small settlements, mostly within approximately six kilometers of the above towns. They are Bonanne, Steelpark, Duncanville, Unitas Park, Sonland Park, Waldrift, Rust-ter-Vaal, Roshnee and Debonair Park. The area also comprises a number of large residential areas, all of which require considerable investment in infrastructure and environmental upgrading.

It also contains six large townships namely Evaton, Sebokeng, Sharpeville, Boipatong, Bophelong and Tshepiso. These centers currently lack the facilities generally associated with towns of their size.

== Mismanagement ==
Emfuleni Municipality was placed under administration in June 2018. OUTA believed that Emfuleni's service delivery had collapsed by 2018, and that the situation was causing human rights violations. It suggested that criminal enforcement action be taken to rectify its non-compliance as detailed in two directives and nine non-compliance notices. The Portfolio Committee on Cooperative Governance and Traditional Affairs (Cogta) expressed the opinion in 2020 that Emfuleni is dysfunctional without any evidence of improvement, and that it displayed no dedicated efforts to serve the public. The municipality conducted inefficient operations for years, accumulating unauthorized, irregular and wasteful expenses, while showing a disregard for laws and regulations, accompanied with poor oversight and consequence management. At the same time it displayed a lack of willingness to accept advice and cooperation in the form of public-private partnerships. The Democratic Alliance (DA) recommended that the Emfuleni council be dissolved, as service delivery had collapsed.

A 2018 High Court judgment allowed Eskom to seize R645 million worth of Emfuleni's fixed assets due to non-payment for electricity. In 2021 members of the mayoral council (or MMCs) expressed their "surprise" when Eskom commenced with electricity disconnections in parts of Sebokeng and Evaton, and accused the utility of "putting the lives of councillors at risk". The municipality's 2018/19 year-end balance sheet revealed irregular expenditure of R1.1 billion due to non-compliance with laws and regulations. Its committee for public accounts did not investigate these irregular expenditures, nor was its senior manager held accountable, or 81 matters highlighted by the Auditor-General investigated.

The DA pointed out that the municipality spent the exorbitant amount of R378 million on overtime payments during the 2015/2016 to 2019/2020 financial years, besides up to R10 million a month on travel claims and excessive amounts on the salaries of two administrators while it was facing a serious cash flow problem. Its financial recovery plan was ineffective leaving it with a backlog of R586 million for the 2019/2020 financial year. Its unserviced debt with Eskom (over R2.3 bn by 2020, and R3.5 bn by 2021) and Rand Water (some R1.1 bn) prevented it from providing a reliable power and water supply, which negatively affected its ability to collect levies and taxes. By 2020 it had failed to collect R8.6 billion in debt from its residents, and its own debt book reached R9.5 billion or 150% of its annual budget. In 2020 Emfuleni halted attachment of its assets by committing to pay R50 million of its historic debt to Eskom, but in 2021 faced the prospect of forfeiting its electricity infrastructure and/or electricity revenue streams to service further unpaid Eskom debt to the value of R1.3 billion.

Sewage spills and water leaks were the norm, and when an employee drowned at its wastewater treatment plant due to a lack of proper equipment, there was no follow-up. Despite the R3 billion that was spent on local wastewater treatment plants between 2011 and 2018, these plants continued to discharge raw sewage into the Vaal River, Klip River and Riet Spruit. Several suburbs, including Drie Riviere, Duncanville, Falcon Ridge and Sonland Park experienced power cuts which would last for days on end. The installation of smart meters turned into a costly debacle when Emfuleni, due lack of planning and foresight, did not honour its 2013-2017 contract with supplier BXC. Parts of the municipality were plunged into darkness without warning. On 25 September 2024 Emfuleni municipality failed to pay its workers due to municipality debts. On 10 October 2024 the DA in Gauteng wants to probe into R130,000 of sick leave paid to one of the officials.

In spite of the court rulings, in October 2024 the municipality admitted that it had returned R640 million in unspent funds, intended for infrastructure improvements, to the Treasury.

== Violence and corruption ==
In March 2025, a company, Yellow Star Manufacturing, was accused of paying corrupt Emfuleni officials to set up illegal electricity infrastructure, costing the municipality millions of rand a month.

In March 2026, an employee was assassinated after exposing R16 million fleet procurement fraud in the municipality.

== Main places ==
The 2001 census divided the municipality into the following main places:

Place	Code	Area (km^{2})	Population	Most spoken language
Boipatong	70401	1.62	16,867	Sotho
Bophelong	70402	5.97	37,782	Sotho
Evaton	70404	35.20	143,157	Sotho
Orange Farm	70405	3.79	16,720	Zulu
Sebokeng	70406	32.80	222,045	Sotho
Sharpeville	70407	5.04	41,032	Sotho
Tshepiso	70408	5.26	22,952	Sotho
Vanderbijlpark	70409	207.69	80,205	Afrikaans
Vereeniging	70410	191.33	73,283	Afrikaans
Remainder of the municipality	70403	498.77	4,378	Sotho

== Politics ==
The municipal council consists of ninety members elected by mixed-member proportional representation. Forty-five councillors are elected by first-past-the-post voting in forty-five wards, while the remaining forty-five are chosen from party lists so that the total number of party representatives is proportional to the number of votes received.

In the election of 4 November 2026, no party won a majority. The Democratic Alliance (DA) won the most seats.

The following table shows the results of the election.

Party	Ward			List			Total seats
Party	Votes	%	Seats	Votes	%	Seats	Total seats
Democratic Alliance	78,217	40.52	34	79,180	41.29	3	37
African National Congress	46,309	23.99	11	45,857	23.91	11	22
Economic Freedom Fighters	11,951	6.19	0	11,572	6.03	6	6
ActionSA	10,804	5.60	0	11,709	6.11	5	5
Freedom Front Plus	10,647	5.52	0	10,943	5.71	5	5
uMkhonto weSizwe Party	7,788	4.03	0	8,566	4.47	4	4
South African Communist Party	5,698	2.95	0	5,287	2.76	3	3
Pan Africanist Congress of Azania	3,910	2.03	0	3,601	1.88	2	2
Active Citizens of South Africa	3,207	1.66	0	2,759	1.44	2	2
Patriotic Alliance	2,170	1.12	0	1,333	0.70	1	1
African Transformation Movement	1,273	0.66	0	1,389	0.72	1	1
Tau Dia Rora Cultural and Traditional Lekgotla	920	0.48	0	1,025	0.53	1	1
Afrika Mayibuye Movement	871	0.45	0	786	0.41	1	1
Independent candidates	1,312	0.68	0				0
36 other parties	7,962	4.12	0	7,756	4.04	0	0
Total	193,039	100.00	45	191,763	100.00	45	90
Valid votes	193,039	98.77		191,763	98.84		
Invalid/blank votes	2,408	1.23		2,257	1.16		
Total votes	195,447	100.00		194,020	100.00		
Registered voters/turnout	371,556	52.60		371,556	52.22		
