= Evaton =

- Location within Gauteng Location within South Africa
- Coordinates: 26°31′39″S 27°50′48″E
- Country: South Africa
- Province: Gauteng
- District: Sedibeng
- Municipality: Emfuleni

Area
  - Total: 28.37 km^{2} (10.95 sq mi)

Population (2011)
  - Total: 254,678
  - Density: 8,977/km^{2} (23,250/sq mi)

Racial makeup (2011)
  - Black African: 99.2%
  - Coloured: 0.4%
  - Indian/Asian: 0.1%
  - White: 0.1%
  - Other: 0.3%

First languages (2011)
  - Sotho: 60.7%
  - Zulu: 19.5%
  - Xhosa: 7.2%
  - Tswana: 2.8%
  - Other: 9.8%
- Time zone: UTC+2 (SAST)
- Postal code (street): 1984
- PO box: 1985
- Area code: 016

Evaton is a township north of Sebokeng, that's divided into three; Evaton Central, Evaton West (popularly known as "Mkhelele", after Helman Mkhalele) and Evaton North, in the Emfuleni Local Municipality of Gauteng, South Africa. It was established in 1904. Like other townships in the area, Evaton was affected by the violent unrest which erupted in 1984 and by 1985 a state of emergency was imposed.

== Neighbouring townships ==
Neighbouring townships include Sebokeng, Orange Farm, Boipatong, Sharpeville, Small Farms, Boitumelo, Polokong, Golden Gardens, Palm Springs and Lakeside.

== Evaton Renewal Project ==
The Evaton Renewal Project is a project of government aimed at “renewing” or regenerating Evaton to improve the quality of life of the Evaton community. The priority areas of this project include: the development of infrastructure, such as the resurfacing of roads and building of pavements; the development of the local economy through job creation and Small, Micro and Medium Enterprise (SMME) projects, like grass-cutting and the setting up of vegetable gardens and small-scale agriculture. The project has since proven to be a failure.
