= Vaal uprising =

1984–1986 protests in South Africa

- Part of the Internal resistance to apartheid
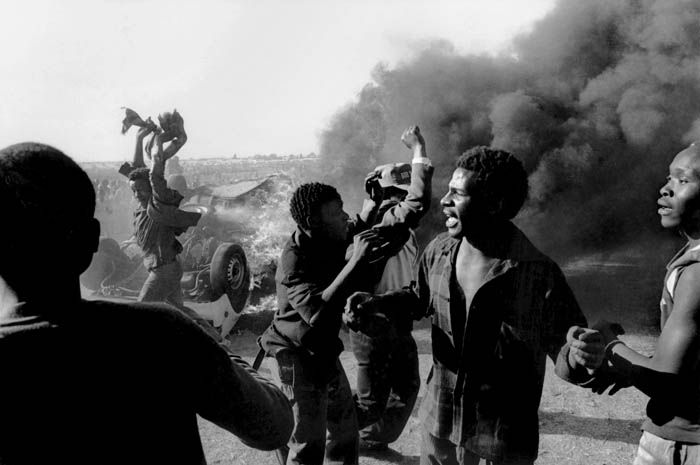
- Anti-apartheid protestors in a South African township in the mid-1980s
- Location: South Africa
- Participants: Vaal Civic Association; United Democratic Front; Congress of South African Students
- Start date: 3 September 1984
- Deaths: 1,600 by June 1986
- Outcome: Delmas Treason Trial; 20 July 1985: Partial state of emergency; 12 June 1986: National state of emergency

The Vaal uprising was a period of popular revolt in black townships in apartheid-era South Africa, beginning in the Vaal Triangle on 3 September 1984. Sometimes known as the township revolt and driven both by local grievances and by opposition to apartheid, the uprising lasted two years and affected most regions of the country. The National Party-led government under P. W. Botha failed to curb the violence until after it imposed a national state of emergency in June 1986.

The uprising began on 3 September in the Vaal Triangle, an industrial region south of Johannesburg, where the local Vaal Civic Association had organised a stay-away to protest rent increases. In the deadliest day of protesting since the 1976 Soweto uprising, there were an estimated 300 injuries and 29 fatalities, some of whom were black local councillors executed by protestors. Over the next year, civic associations and student organisations carried the riots to other areas of the country. From late 1984, in what marked a new phase of united mass action in opposition politics, protestors received support from the emerging trade union movement, including from the Federation of South African Trade Unions.

A primary target of the violence in townships were black local councillors, newly empowered by the Black Local Authorities Act. Also targeted were others viewed as collaborators of the apartheid system, such as black policemen, informants, and even school principals. A considerable number of those killed during the uprising were killed by protestors in acts of vigilante justice, including in some cases by necklacing, although many others were killed by state security forces or by rival vigilantes. Opposition to black local authorities constituted an intersection between local and socioeconomic grievances, on the one hand, and broad opposition to apartheid, on the other.

Many of the civic and student organisations which drove the protests – among them the Congress of South African Students – were formally or informally aligned to the United Democratic Front (UDF), which in turn was aligned to the exiled African National Congress (ANC). Although there remains debate about the extent to which the UDF and ANC provided the organisational and strategic impetus for the uprising, their anti-apartheid ideology and symbols were given prominent place.

The government met the uprising with severity, deploying the South African Defence Force to police the townships from October 1984. A partial state of emergency was enforced in the Transvaal and Cape Province from July 1985, extended in October 1985, and then surpassed in June 1986 by a stronger state of emergency, which applied across the country and remained in place for four years thereafter. The national state of emergency is viewed as having dampened the uprising by the end of 1986, but continuous protest and intermittent violence remained a feature of township life until negotiations to end apartheid were completed in 1994. Although the Vaal uprising is credited with having emboldened black civil society to carry out the final phase of opposition to apartheid, it also marked the beginning of an unprecedented upswing in political violence in South Africa, much of which set black groups against each other.

== Background ==
=== Koornhof Bills ===
The key national political development in the run-up to the uprising was the introduction of a package of political reforms by the South African government, then led by P. W. Botha. The government proposed that it would maintain the system of racial separation known as apartheid while also providing for increased political representation of non-white groups. A new Constitution and a package of three laws – known as the Koornhof Bills after Minister Piet Koornhof – would achieve this by establishing a Tricameral Parliament, with separate junior houses for Coloureds and Indians respectively, and by expanding the powers of community councils in black townships, henceforth known as black local authorities. Because these reforms provided only superficial political representation for non-whites, they were vociferously opposed by most of the anti-apartheid movement. The first elections to black local authorities took place in late 1983 with very poor turnout; and the first elections to the Tricameral Parliament in 1984 were marred by a successful boycott campaign, spearheaded by the United Democratic Front (UDF) and its affiliates.

=== Simmering hostilities ===
Although the Vaal uprising marked the beginning of an open and sustained revolt, it was preceded by an "underground war" or "series of localised confrontations", for example clashes in Pietermaritzburg in 1982; in Durban and Mdantsane in 1983; and in Crossroads, Atteridgeville, Cradock, Tumahole, and the East Rand earlier in 1984. Over the same period, in Soweto and some other areas, there was a demonstrable upswing in a longstanding habit of persecution of black local councillors. The boycott of the 1984 election, held in the last week of August, was accompanied by large-scale protests, resulting in a large number of arrests. Some of the candidates for the Tricameral Parliament were also targeted in petrol bomb attacks.

== Course of the uprising ==
=== Black Monday: 3 September 1984 ===
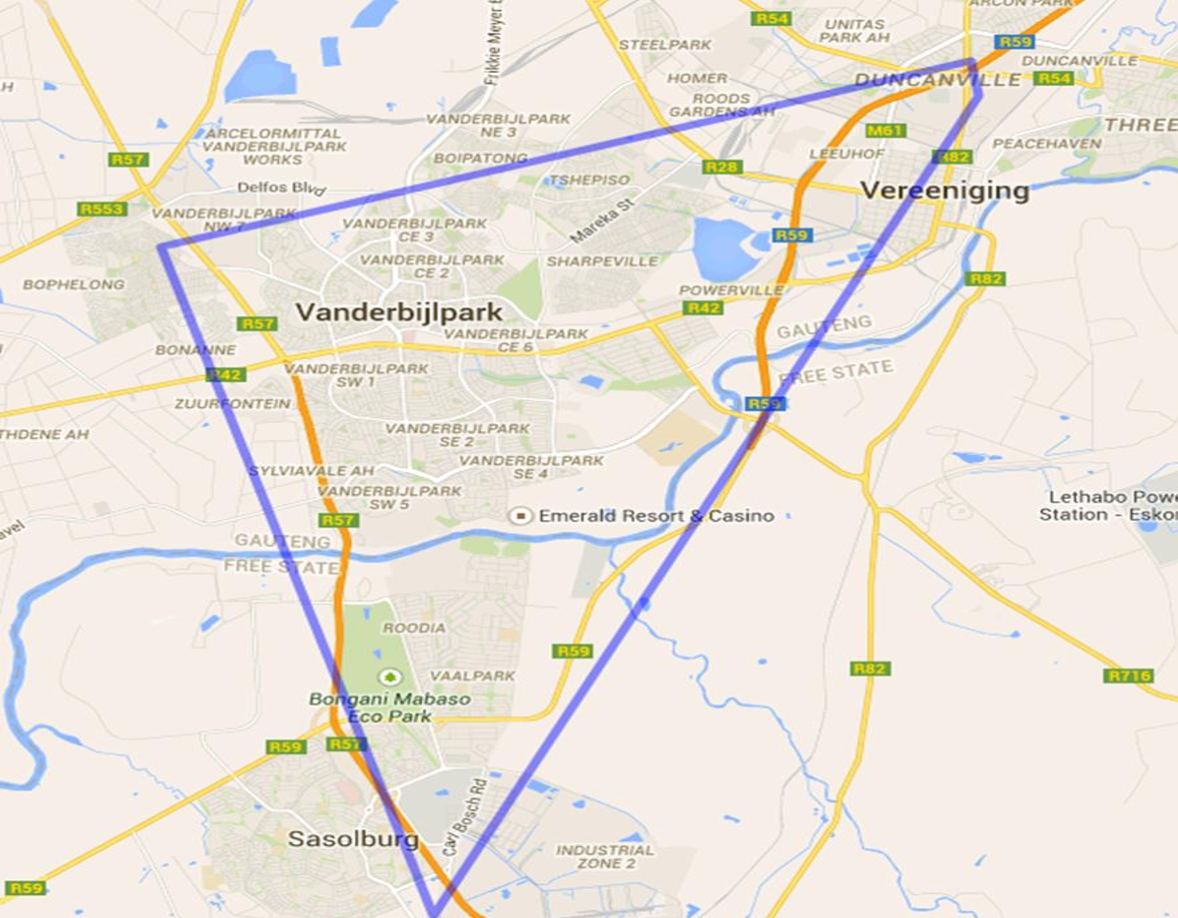
Map of the Vaal Triangle

The uprising is named for the place it began: the black townships of the Vaal Triangle, an industrial area about 45 miles south of Johannesburg in Transvaal's PWV region. In this region, the Vaal Civic Association (VCA) and other local activists held a series of meetings in August 1984 about proposed rent increases. On 2 September, they resolved that residents should protest the increases by refusing to pay them and by staying away – both from school and from work – the following day. Thus on 3 September protestors marched through several Vaal townships in considerable numbers, delivering their demands to the Orange Vaal Development Board. In at least three of those townships – Sharpeville, Sebokeng, and Evaton – the marches turned at an indeterminate point into riots. There were also reports of violence in Boipatong in Vaal, Tembisa on the East Rand, and Mamelodi north of Pretoria.

In these areas, a number of buildings were set on fire; police were attacked with petrol bombs and bricks; roads were barricaded; and a stretch of the Golden Highway in Vereeniging was closed by police after protestors stoned cars. Six buses were set alight, and the deputy mayor of Sharpeville, Jacob Dlamini, was hacked to death in the street and then returned to his car, which was set on fire. The precise impetus for the violence is unclear. Franziska Rueedi argues that at least some of the violence was partly premeditated: although the Vaal Civic Association intended the marches to be peaceful, there were other, more militant groupings who were not committed to non-violence. She suggests that other acts of violence, including the killing of Dlamini and other black councillors, were "spontaneous and resulted from hostile interactions between crowds, police and councillors".

The South African Police responded initially with tear gas and rubber bullets, and then began using live ammunition; heavily armed reinforcements were brought in and continued to battle protestors overnight. The government reported 14 fatalities, including some as a result of police "countermeasures". The following morning – as rioting continued in Sharpeville, Sebokeng, and Evaton – figures were revised upwards to 29 fatalities and an estimated 300 injuries, including at least a handful of injured policemen. It was therefore the bloodiest day of protests in South Africa since the 1976 Soweto uprising. In 1976, however, the police had unambiguously been responsible for the overwhelming majority of deaths; in Vaal, it was clear that deaths had been caused by protestors as well as by police, though it was not clear in what proportions. Rueedi calculates that protestors killed four councillors and that the rest of the victims were shot by police.

The protests of 3 September turned into a popular uprising across several regions of the country, with many further deaths – 40 by the end of the first week. The unrest spread to Soweto, the country's largest township, the next week.

=== Key organisations ===
Key figures in the early phases of the Vaal uprising in the Vaal Triangle area were the Vaal Civic Association VCA and the Congress of South African Students (COSAS). Both were affiliates of the UDF, a nationwide popular front of civic organisations which had been launched in August 1983 and which subsequently had played a leading role in boycotts of the 1984 general election. Some of the UDF's affiliates in black townships, notably in Atteridgeville, Kagiso, and Soweto, had organised local campaigns against the Koornhof Bills, and in 1983 the front had boasted that its involvement had contributed to low election turnouts at that year's council elections – though, according to Jeremy Seekings, its involvement was neither intensive nor well-organised.

Most of the organisations at the forefront of the uprising considered themselves to be affiliates of the UDF, whether formally or informally. These included local civic associations as well as some national structures, such as the Release Mandela Committee. However, branches of the Azanian People's Organisation (AZAPO) were also involved in parts of the Cape Province and Transvaal, as were various unaffiliated and relatively autonomous groups, particularly militant youth groups, many of which were formed during the course of the uprising.

==== Vaal Civic Association ====
The organisation which spearheaded the 3 September march was the VCA, a residents' organisation partly modelled on the successful Soweto Civic Association. Launched on 9 October 1983, VCA was an affiliate of the UDF, and two senior officials in the UDF's Transvaal branch – Curtis Nkondo and Elliot Shabangu – were guest speakers at its launch in October 1983. Its inaugural chairman was Lord McCamel, a local priest with a parish in Evaton, and his deputy was Esau Ralitsela.

==== Congress of South African Students ====
Accounts of the uprising typically accord a central role to black young adults – known in the anti-apartheid movement as "young lions" or "comrades" – who became the "shock troops" of the revolt. Their largest and most prominent organisational base was COSAS, another UDF affiliate that was founded in 1979, with a local branch in Vaal from March 1980. COSAS apparently played an important role in politicising the youth of Vaal, including by encouraging them to support the VCA, and many of the most militant participants in the uprising were formally or informally affiliated to COSAS.

=== Operation Palmiet: October 1984 ===
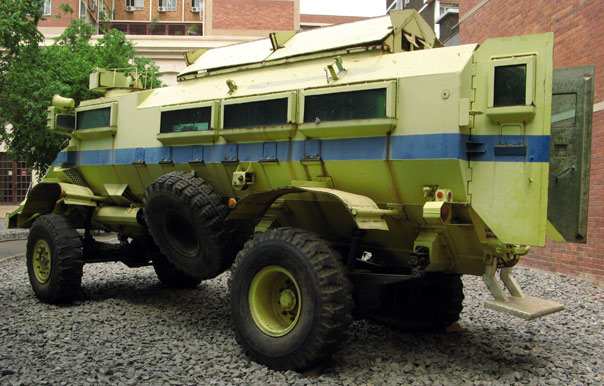
In the mid-1980s, Casspirs became a symbol of state repression

When it became evident that the police was incapable of containing the uprising, the South African Defence Force (SADF) was deployed to assist police operations – first in Joza township, outside Grahamstown, on 6 October, and then in Soweto the following morning. Radio Freedom welcomed the deployments as a sign of the apartheid regime's desperation, declaring, "There is no way out for the Botha regime... Botha’s guns and batons are failing."

On 23 October, military repression accelerated in earnest with the launch of Operation Palmiet (Afrikaans for "bullrush") in Sebokeng and three nearby townships, Sharpeville, Boipatong, and Bophelong. As part of a campaign to "rid the area of criminal and revolutionary elements", a heavily armed joint force of 7,000 police and SADF members cordoned off the townships and conducted a house-to-house search of about 19,500 houses, accommodating an estimated 225,000 people. After being searched in their home and at roadblocks, residents were given labels or ink to wear to prove that they had been "vetted" and were allowed to move around. The labels bore the printed slogan, "I am your friend, trust me", while stamps on people's hands read "friendly forces".

The Washington Post said that it was "the biggest crackdown on political dissent ever mounted" in South Africa, as well as the first time that the military had been "employed so openly to quell racial dissent". 363 people were arrested by the end of the day, primarily for what the police called "minor crimes", but Trevor Manuel of the UDF warned that the house searches were pointless: "the authorities are looking for something they cannot find under beds or wardrobes. The anger of the people over rentals and lack of participation in government does not hide in those places".

Military deployments subsequently became commonplace and in some respects were counterproductive for the regime. Operation Palmiet, for example, though it temporarily quelled unrest in the occupied townships, was accompanied by outbreaks of violence in townships on the East and West Rand and others in the Cape Province around Port Elizabeth and Grahamstown. Almost immediately after troops completed their phased withdrawal from the Vaal on 24 October, a crowd of some 2,000 residents gathered in Sebokeng to confront the remaining police contingents, starting a fresh round of street fighting, while more than 70,000 children in the area launched an impromptu school boycott. The military were forced to return to the area on 31 October. According to Thula Simpson:

In the following months this pattern was witnessed repeatedly: as the security forces deployed into a particular township, violent protest flared elsewhere; as they withdrew, unrest resumed where they had been. The floundering response of the security forces, resembling a fire engine racing repeatedly to the wrong fire, only fanned the flames of insurrection. Furthermore, these events, transmitted worldwide by an international press corps that had virtually unfettered access to the country at the time, communicated the message that government's writ in black areas only ran because of the huge military superiority the security forces enjoyed over virtually defenceless township inhabitants. In 1985, daily television images of confrontations between gun-wielding policemen and rock-throwing youths fuelled the debate in international circles over whether or not to impose sanctions on South Africa.

=== Transvaal stayaway: 5–6 November 1984 ===
On 27 October, at a meeting of 37 political, civic, and labour organisations in Johannesburg, COSAS reiterated a prior call for workers to support the youth's demands and oppose the heavy-handed state response to the uprising. The meeting resolved to form an ad hoc joint committee, the Transvaal Regional Stay-Away Committee, which would coordinate a two-day stay-away. In a major development, trade unions – notably the largest union, the Federation of South African Trade Unions, but also the Council of Mining Unions and the Metal and Allied Workers' Union – overcame their prevailing tendency towards to political "absenteeism" and participated.

The stay-away, held on 5 to 6 November, was a resounding success. On competing estimates, between 40 per cent and 60 per cent of workers in Johannesburg did not attend work on the first day, and the government said that 250,000 students had not attended school. On the second day, the figures were even higher, including an estimated 90 per cent of workers in Vaal, 85 per cent on the East Rand, and 66 per cent in Soweto. That evening, Sasol, the state-owned energy corporation, announced that it had fired 90 per cent of its workforce – 6,000 workers – for participating. The work-stoppage was accompanied in some areas by further violence and arson, met by police tear gas and rubber bullets; ten people were reported killed on the first day and a further seven on the second. At the end of the stay-away, it was estimated that, since 3 September, there had been a total of 97 deaths, more than 500 injuries, and about 2,000 arrests.

=== Continued unrest ===
Over Christmas, the UDF called for supporters to observe a "Black Christmas" – a form of consumer boycott, among other things – to mourn the casualties. This led to a fortnight of "comparative calm", excepting a large-scale confrontation on Christmas Day in Sharpeville, where a large crowd had clashed with police after returning from a Black Christmas event at the graves of those killed. Violence broke out again in PWV after Boxing Day.

Morale was boosted by the successes of the Vaal uprising – the government had been forced to make certain concessions, removing local councillors to safety and suspending the rent increases – and militant vigour was piqued both by the severe state response and by the presence of troops in the townships, taken by some as a "declaration of war". The increased presence of state security forces in the townships led to a proliferation of opportunistic violence against the forces' members, who – if present in small enough numbers, or if they had run out of ammunition – became a frequent target for stone-throwing. One account describes young militants developing elaborate strategies to obstruct the security services' work: digging trenches to prevent armoured vehicles from moving around, blocking roads with burning tyres and rocks, painting over house numbers and other identifiers to stop police from identifying activists' houses, and staking out "liberated areas" where police and other state representatives could not go.

Violence remained most consistent and most severe in the Vaal and surrounds, but by the end of 1985 it had affected most of the country's townships. In early 1985, the unrest spread across the Witwatersrand, across the Orange Free State, and across the eastern part of the Cape Province (the hub of the country's automotive industry). By August 1985, it had entered the western part of the Cape, the eastern Transvaal, and parts of Natal.

=== State response ===
==== Delmas Treason Trial: June 1985 ====
In June 1985, the state indicted 22 senior VCA and UDF activists on treason charges for their alleged role in instigating the uprising; the Delmas Treason Trial ultimately resulted in 11 convictions, four on the original charge of treason and seven others for terrorism. The large number of arrests effected during the uprising also resulted in other trials (such as that of the Sharpeville six) and, more commonly, in lengthy detentions without trial. In December 1987, the Weekly Mail counted that, since the outbreak of the uprising in September 1984, 44 black people had been sentenced to hang for related killings; five of them had already hung.

==== First state of emergency: July 1985 ====
On 20 July 1985, President Botha declared a partial state of emergency, effective from midnight, which he said would hold indefinitely in 36 townships around Johannesburg and in the eastern Cape. It was the first state of emergency since that imposed after the 1960 Sharpeville massacre, although a different variety of emergency regulation had also been imposed after the 1976 Soweto uprising. The death toll of the uprising was at that point estimated at 450 fatalities, and Botha said the emergency would combat "acts of violence and thuggery... mainly directed at the property and person of law-abiding black people". In a statement, he said:

I wish to give the assurance that law-abiding people have nothing to fear. At the same time, I wish to issue a warning that strict action will be taken against those persons and institutions that cause or propagate disruption.

The order gave the police and military "virtually unlimited" powers of search-and-seizure and arrest, as well as powers to seal off, impose curfews on, and censor news from the affected areas. During the first week, 1,000 activists were detained in the affected areas, and 16 people were killed. Despite the emergency, unrest continued in the Transvaal and eastern Cape and worsened elsewhere, particularly in Natal and the western Cape. On 26 October 1985, the government extended the emergency to the western Cape, where it said that the situation had reached a "state of pre-insurrection"; confrontations there had heightened since August, when the state had suppressed a planned march on Pollsmoor Prison, where Nelson Mandela was being held. In all, the emergency degree was applied to detain between 8,000 and 12,000 people without trial.

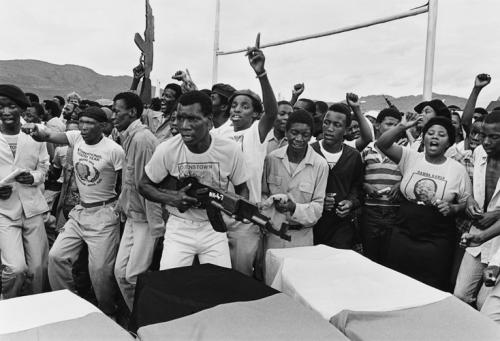
Funeral for the victims of the Queenstown Massacre, December 1985

==== Second state of emergency: June 1986 ====
The partial emergency was lifted on 7 March 1986, only to be replaced on 12 June – in the run-up to the tenth anniversary of the Soweto uprising on 16 June – by a second, far more stringent state of emergency, now applying across the country. Among other things, the new order empowered any member of the police or army to use any kind of force deemed necessary to clear an area. With the death toll by then "far in excess of 1,600", Botha told Parliament, "I am of the opinion that the ordinary laws of the land at present on the statute book are inadequate to enable the government to insure the security of the public and to maintain public order". The government said that it detained more than 1,000 people on the first day of the emergency; 30,000 were detained by August 1987.

Indeed, the primary use of the emergency orders was to enable mass and indefinite detention of those viewed by the government as the ringleaders or instigators of the unrest. Critics of the government argued that this was deeply counterproductive, as the putative ringleaders were generally "simply the most articulate and experienced activists", the removal of whom "created a political vacuum into which unruly, undisciplined elements surged". In the phrase of the UDF's Murphy Morobe (speaking to press while in hiding to evade arrest), "Removing responsible leaders of the people has effectively paved the way for a blood bath". Desmond Tutu lamented as early as May 1986 that the government "have arrested the very people they should be talking to... What you are left with is a faceless mob, which is much harder to control". In addition, the orders stoked international concern; after the July 1985 announcement, the rand dropped to a record low, nearly matched in June 1986, and South African reserves were severely depleted.

Nonetheless, the national state of emergency led to a sharp drop in reports of violence in the townships in subsequent months, in most accounts drawing the Vaal uprising to something approximating a conclusion; by 1987, wide-scale unrest persisted most severely in the KwaNdebele bantustan and later, in a different form, in Natal. However, there was continuous protest and intermittent violence across the country, including in Vaal, until and throughout the negotiations to end apartheid. The national state of emergency remained in place, renewed annually, until Botha's successor, F. W. de Klerk, announced in June 1990 that he would allow the decree to lapse everywhere but Natal.

== Patterns of violence ==
Vigilante violence was a key feature of the Vaal uprising. Armed primarily with stones and petrol bombs, and in some relatively uncommon cases with hand grenades and guns, the more militant among the uprising's participants not only waged a "war of attrition" against security forces but also harassed and in many cases executed individuals whom they viewed as collaborators of the apartheid regime.

=== Black local authorities ===
In the immediate aftermath of the 3 September riots, it was already evident that members of black local councils had been targeted; initial figures suggested that at least three councillors had been killed and the homes of several others subjected to arson attacks. Later analyses showed that attacks on property had, similarly, targeted government buildings and shops, vehicles, and houses owned by councillors and, to a lesser extent, by local black policemen. This pattern was maintained in later months. The government was forced to relocate Vaal councillors to a secure complex on the outskirts of Sebokeng, and large numbers of councillors nationwide (257 between September 1984 and May 1985) resigned in fear. By mid-1985, Minister of Constitutional Development Chris Heunis was forced to begin appointing white civil servants to the councils for a lack of black applicants, and in June of that year it was estimated that fewer than six local councils remained operative in the entire country. Combined with rent boycotts, this brought public services to a halt in many townships.

Similarly, black policemen – some employed by the Security Branch – were targeted. According to government figures, about 500 houses belonging to black policemen were burned down between March 1984 and November 1985. The Azanian People's Liberation Army admitted to killing ten policemen in 1986 in Sharpeville alone, and in the first half of 1987 the police recorded that their members in the Vaal Triangle had been the victims of thirty-eight incidents of arson, thirty-one incidents of "intimidation", and thirty-nine incidents of stoning. In some cases, attacks on policemen were retributive, with policemen accused of having carried out assassinations of or other attacks on local political activists; residents of Sharpeville also claimed that the police themselves engaged in retributive attacks, creating a "cycle of violence". Research suggests that school principals – particularly unpopular ones and those seen to be aiding the police – were an additional target for attacks from about January 1986 onwards.

=== Informants and holdouts ===
Also targeted were civilians suspected of being informants of the apartheid police. Alongside petrol bombs, necklacing became a favoured method of executing such suspects. In one early example known nationwide, a young woman in Duduza, Maki Skosana, was necklaced on 20 July 1985 at a funeral for a local activist; a television crew filmed a crowd of young men kicking and beating her, tearing her clothes off, dousing her in petrol, and then setting her alight while one man rammed a glass bottle into her vagina. Skosana was rumoured to be the girlfriend and co-conspirator of Joe Mamasela, a notorious askari who had killed several Duduza youths by hand grenade in an entrapment operation in June.

In addition, though mass action had broad support during this period, there were frequently complaints that the reluctant were compelled to participate in stay-aways or boycotts by force or intimidation. Groups of COSAS supports were accused of "erecting barricades to prevent residents from going to work; attacking those who tried to do so; moving from school to school ordering students out of class; hurling stones and petrol bombs at policemen; attacking buses and taxis; digging trenches in the streets; destroying buildings; and assaulting members of rival organisations". There was also evidence that vigilante attacks were sometimes perpetrated on the basis of mere political or personal "grudges".

=== Political funerals ===
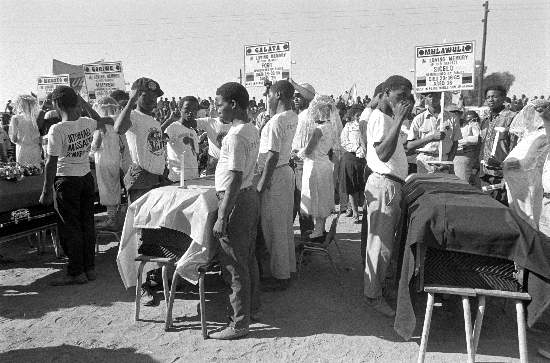
The funeral of the Cradock Four in Cradock, 20 July 1985

Funerals of activists killed in the intensifying violence became an important focal point for political activity and for further violence. Widely attended, culturally important, and highly emotional, they often attracted rosters of guest speakers drawn from among the top rung of the internal anti-apartheid movement and were closely monitored by state security forces. In 1985, funerals were the site of massacres by police in Uitenhage and in Queenstown. Thula Simpson writes:

As the journalist Allister Sparks observed, during the uprising there was a funeral almost every weekend for people who had been killed in clashes with the authorities. At those funerals, police would open fire on demonstrators, thus creating the next week’s funeral – feeding an unending cycle of rage and mourning.

On 20 July 1985, Botha's announcement of the state of emergency was immediately followed by news broadcasts of events of two separate funerals, both held earlier that day: footage of Maki Skosana's execution in Duduza was juxtaposed with footage of the funeral of the Cradock Four in the Cape, at which activists brazenly unfurled South African Communist Party flags and chanted the name of Umkhonto we Sizwe (MK). The state of emergency regulations themselves included restrictions on the conduct and attendance of funerals, which in turn were protested and defied, leading to further confrontation, notably in townships north of Durban after the funeral of Victoria Mxenge on 1 August 1985.

== Motives ==
=== Local grievances ===
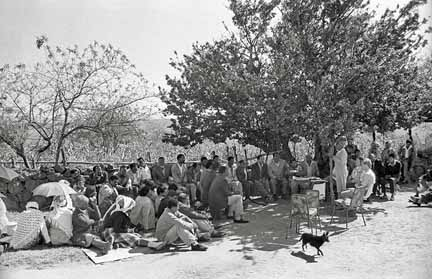
A community meeting under a tree in Driefontein in the eastern Transvaal, 10 May 1984

Most directly, the 3 September 1984 march was a response to rent increases in the Vaal. In this context, rents included basic housing rent as well as service tariffs and levies, paid to local councils, and they had quadrupled in Vaal since 1977. By 1984, the Vaal Triangle was the most expensive black area in South Africa. The lowest rents in Sebokeng, for example, at R50 per month, were the cheapest in Vaal, but were still higher than the highest rents in Soweto, at R48 per month. Jeremy Seekings argues that most violent confrontations in black townships in the preceding years had, similarly, been driven largely by discontent over local issues, such as rent increases, shack demolitions, or (a particularly emotive issue because of the Group Areas Act) increases in the cost of transport to urban workplaces.

The Black Local Authorities Act of 1982, moreover, had fused these local grievances with the indifference and discontent that was popularly directed at black local councillors. The turnout in the 1983 council elections was exceptionally low, at 21 per cent – 10.7 per cent in Soweto – suggesting little buy-in to the council system. However, even many of those who had no principled objection to the Black Local Authorities grew disenchanted in 1984, as local councillors elected in 1983 broke their campaign promises and raised service charges. As Colin Bundy observed, the establishment of local councils "succeeded in transforming aloof, physically distant agents of the state into identifiable individuals who lived and operated among those whom they ruled", and who could therefore become the focal point for residents' anger.

=== Political grievances ===
Local authorities may also have become the focal point for more broad and abstract objections to the apartheid system. Boycott campaigns in 1983 and 1984 had sought to tie local grievances to the policies of the apartheid state, including the Koornhof reforms. On some accounts, attacks by protestors on the person and property of councillors and other state representatives was "a clear attack on apartheid symbols", while vigilantes' concern with rooting out collaborators reflected a similar concern with undermining the overall apartheid system. Some observers argued that, as the uprising continued, the strategies and aims of some participants changed, with many – particularly militant youth – setting their sights on the much larger goal of rendering the country "ungovernable" and, ultimately, that of dismantling apartheid through violence.

== Organisational factors ==
The apartheid government immediately rejected the argument that the uprising was the spontaneous result of residents' political and socioeconomic grievances and instead claimed consistently that it had been orchestrated by organisations with ulterior – and insurrectionary – political motives. This was apparent as early as 6 September 1984, when Minister of Law and Order Louis le Grange, making a tour of the Vaal townships in an armoured vehicle, denied that the violence was about rent increases and said, "There are individuals and other forces and organisations very clearly behind what is happening in the Vaal Triangle".

=== African National Congress ===
Some analysts were attracted to the hypothesis that the uprising had been instigated or even planned by the African National Congress (ANC), an organisation which had played an important role in opposing apartheid before 1960, when it was banned by the government and went into exile in Lusaka, Zambia. Harvard Law School's Stephen M. Davis provided the paradigmatic statement of this hypothesis in Apartheid's Rebels, which argued that the unrest was the result of "a massive transformation of the black public" wrought by the ANC by means of "a widening clandestine network of cells to politicize blacks and school them in confrontation". Anthea Jefferey of the South African Institute of Race Relations made a similar argument, in terms less complimentary to the ANC, in her People's War.

In 1979, the ANC's National Executive Committee had indeed endorsed a programme which included mass popular mobilisation inside South Africa, and its literature contained calls to reject the black local authorities. In addition, ANC president Oliver Tambo famously called for opponents of apartheid to make South Africa "ungovernable". On 8 January 1984, Tambo's annual statement to ANC members had included the entreaty:

We should direct our collective might to rendering the enemy's instruments of authority unworkable. To march forward must mean that we advance against the regime's organs of state-power, creating conditions in which the country becomes increasingly ungovernable... Having rejected the community councils by boycotting the elections, we should not allow them to be imposed on us. We do not want them. We must ensure that they cease to exist. Where administration boards take over their functions, then these must be destroyed too.

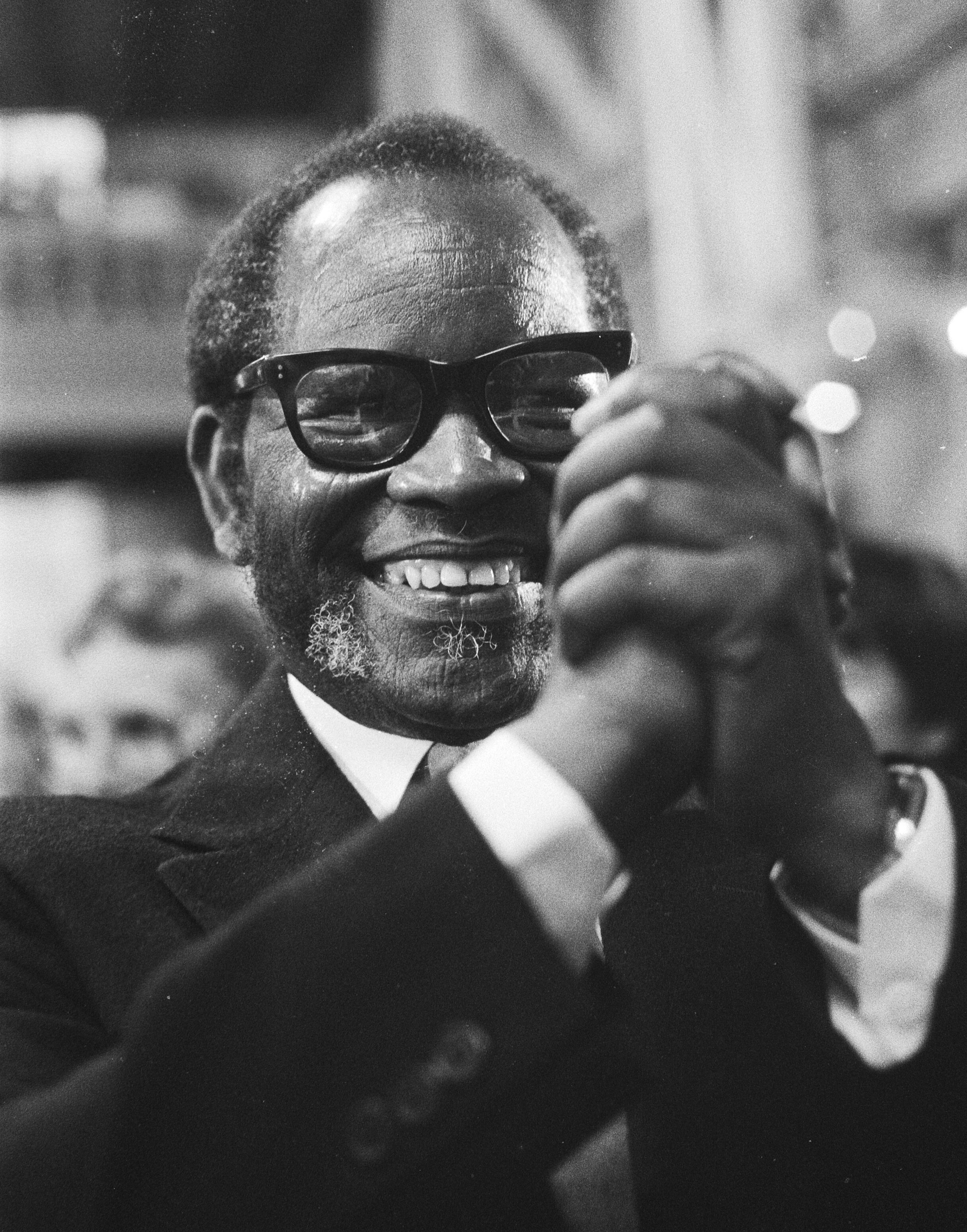
ANC president Oliver Tambo called for South Africans to make the country ungovernable

However, most contemporary accounts agree that the ANC's presence in South African townships during the mid-1980s was sparse and was vastly insufficient to instigate or direct events. Thula Simpson, a historian of the ANC, says that the ANC was largely a "spectator" in the first year of the uprising, though an interested spectator. Mac Maharaj, a senior ANC official, later said that the Vaal uprising had provided a lesson for the ANC precisely because it "took place in a power vacuum. We were not ready or able to exploit fully the potential unleashed by these uprisings." Some historians argue that the ANC did not accelerate its "ungovernability" strategy until 1985, by which time the strategy was little more than an attempt to "place the ANC at the head of an [already] unfolding social revolution".

However, the ANC was not so far removed as to be without influence. At least two founding members of the VCA were members of an underground ANC cell, and some militant youth cells received a degree of training from the ANC's armed wing, MK, or from MK alumni, though this rarely amounted to the full military training that recruits received in MK camps abroad. From 1985, MK cadres began to bring a small number of weapons, such as rifles and hand grenades, to the Vaal area. More significantly, many township activists supported and identified with the ANC. This was particularly the case with militant youths, who, for example, appropriated the symbols of MK's guerrilla war, and who in some cases viewed their local organisations as unofficial cells of MK. Simpson argues of the ANC that, "the appeal of its confrontational policies – and above all its armed struggle – meant it was accorded the mantle of symbolic leadership by the youths spearheading the fighting". On some accounts, many sought to further the uprising precisely (or partly) in order to respond to Tambo's call to make the townships ungovernable.

=== United Democratic Front ===
Minister le Grange's own view was that the key organisation in the unrest was the UDF, which he alleged was a front for the ANC and had organised the uprising on the ANC's behalf. On 5 October 1984, he told the Transvaal provincial congress of the National Party:

When the [UDF's] actions in the republic are judged against its objectives, affiliations, public actions, pronouncements... one can reach no other conclusion but that [it] is pursuing the same revolutionary goals as the banned ANC and South African Communist Party, and is actively promoting a climate of revolution.

In November 1988, the Transvaal Division of the Supreme Court endorsed this view upon the conclusion of the Delmas Treason Trial, convicting three UDF leaders – Popo Molefe, Mosiuoa Lekota, and Moss Chikane – of treason for having instigated the uprising on behalf of the UDF and therefore on behalf of the ANC. The Delmas judge argued that the UDF had ensured that the uprising was "preceded by a propaganda campaign of vast magnitude, which not only attacked the new constitution and the exclusion of blacks therefrom, but also encompassed the Black education system and the Black local authorities".

Not only the state but also many of the UDF's own supporters assigned the UDF a key role in coordinating the uprising. However, Jeremy Seekings, a historian of the UDF, has argued that the front lacked a significant presence in black townships in 1984: at that point, the UDF remained primarily a campaign-based organisation, focused on protesting the Tricameral Parliament and therefore focused on the Coloured and Indian communities who were invited to participate in the parliament. It was only indirectly involved in organising the November 1984 stay-away, and the areas in which UDF organisation was strongest were by no means those which participated most enthusiastically in the uprising. Indeed, Seekings argues that there was little evidence of any organised co-ordination of local protests, even by the local civic associations who were UDF affiliates. He quotes UDF general secretary Popo Molefe's assessment of the 1983 boycotts – that "organisations trail behind the masses" – as applying more broadly to political organisation in PWV's black townships during the mid-1980s.

From the outset, the UDF rejected le Grange's charge that it had been directly involved in revolt: on 10 October 1984, it called a press conference at which it condemned the "mischievous" allegations, distanced itself from the ANC, and reiterated its own commitment to non-violent methods. Its remove from the uprising was reflected more frankly in a November 1984 report by the UDF's Transvaal regional branch to the national executive, which said:

repression mounted, and it found the UDF unprepared for it. Immediately after UDF big names were locked up in jails the whole machinery of the UDF came to a standstill. Crisis in areas like the Vaal, Tembisa and Soweto erupted – No UDF quick response came out. The masses expected UDF to give direction, UDF was not there to give direction, opportunists were there to seize the opportunity. We must address this question very seriously.

However, Seekings suggests that the UDF nonetheless provided "a broad organisational framework and a symbolic coherence to resistance". In other words, though the UDF did not coordinate or initiate local campaigns and organisation, the front provided a framework for activists to increase their contacts with one another, and it moreover provided "an inspirational statement of anti-apartheid ideology", which may have affected both political activists and the wider public.

=== Charterism ===
Section headings of the 1955 Freedom Charter

The People Shall Govern!
All National Groups Shall Have Equal Rights!
The People Shall Share in the Country's Wealth!
The Land Shall Be Shared Among Those Who Work It!
All Shall Be Equal Before The Law!
All Shall Enjoy Equal Human Rights!
There Shall Be Work And Security!
The Doors of Learning And of Culture Shall Be Opened!
There Shall Be Houses, Security And Comfort!
There Shall Be Peace And Friendship!

In line with Seekings's latter point, some historians have assigned a central role to the rise of what was known by 1984 as Charterism: adherence to the Freedom Charter, the anti-apartheid political manifesto adopted at the 1955 Congress of the People (and subsequently banned by the apartheid state). After a period of dormancy inside the country while Black Consciousness ideology predominated, Charterism had been revived from around 1979. On some accounts, this revival was partly the result of the interest of young people, and COSAS, certainly, was fiercely Charterist. Although the UDF had not yet formally adopted the Freedom Charter, many of its affiliates and leaders, while usually identifying implicitly with the ANC, identified explicitly with the Charter; and the growth of the UDF contributed to the spread of Charterism. According to Raymond Suttner:

A whole generation had grown up without access to literature about the Congress movement. This is not to say that the memory was wiped out, but there was a rupture, organisationally, in terms of symbols and also in the free and widespread diffusion of values. The UDF reconnected people to that tradition...

Widespread subscription to the principles of the Freedom Charter, in turn, may have partly inspired the uprising, particularly insofar as the Freedom Charter provided a framework for "linking everyday grievances to aspirations for a new society" or, in other words, for the identification of "the intersection between localised grievances and the strategies and ideology of the ANC".

== Significance and legacy ==
In many accounts, the uprising marked the beginning of a sharp upswing in political mobilisation in South Africa and thus "profoundly altered power relations and heralded the beginning of the end of the apartheid regime". In particular, the uprising both revived older modes of non-violent protest – strikes, boycotts, and public demonstrations – and also moulded "a more militant political culture". Indeed, it occasioned a "dramatic increase in the scope of political violence in South Africa": according to the Ministry of Law and Order, the average yearly number of fatalities from political violence exceeded 1,850 per annum from 1985 to 1994, over 100 times the rate of fatalities in the prior nine-year period.

=== Civic and labour movement ===
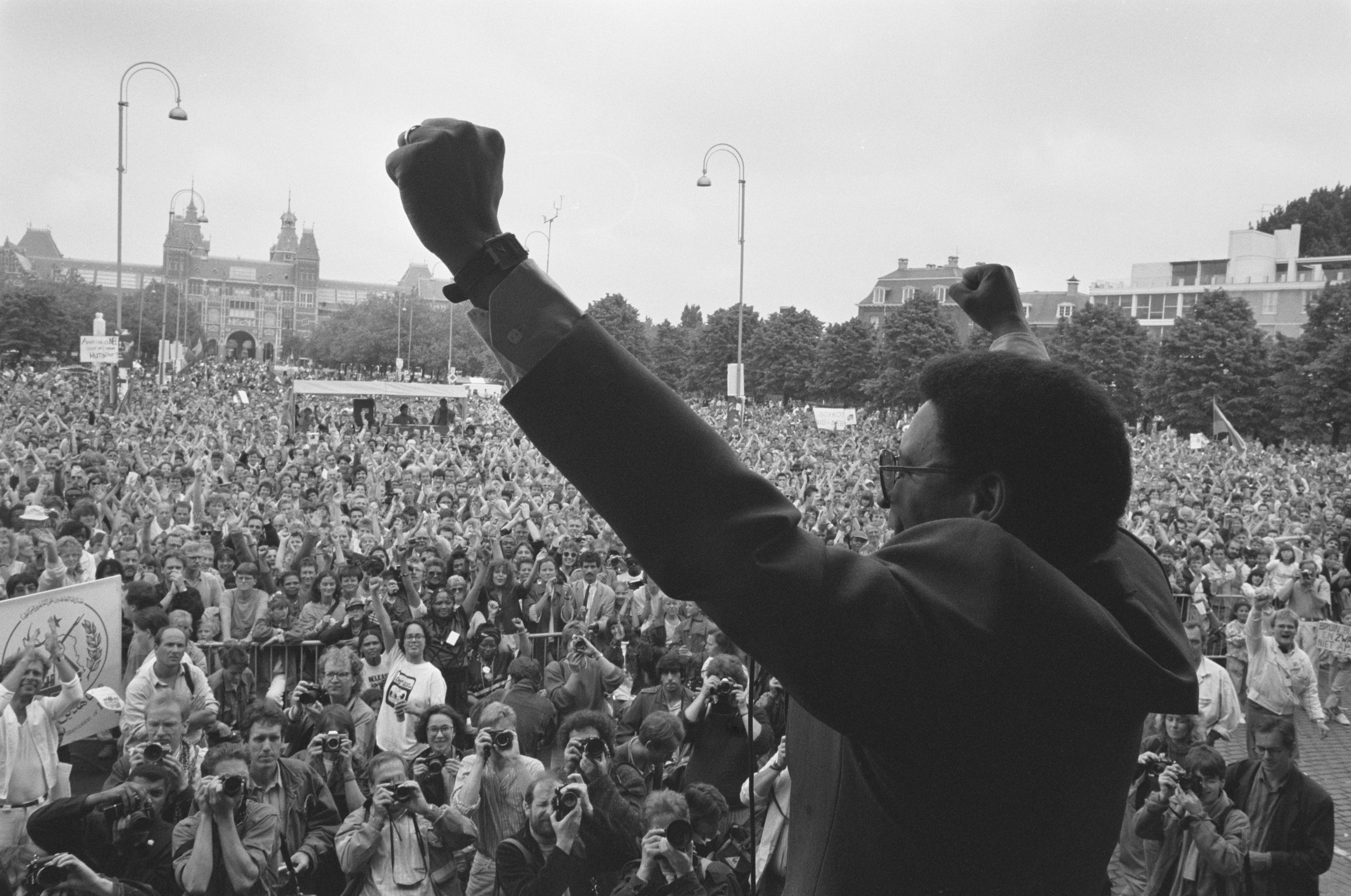
UDF leader Allan Boesak addresses a rally, 11 June 1988

The uprising may have been significant for the organisational development and strategy of the UDF. Over the course of the first year of the uprising, an internal debate was settled in favour of the front taking on a more expansive role, which would go beyond campaign-based protest and opposition to the Tricameral Parliament. Thus in 1985, the front declared its proposal to move "from mobilisation to organisation" through a programme to strengthen its organisational structures and discipline, including through increased accountability and representation for local affiliates. Similarly, at the grassroots level, by 1986 there was a movement in many black townships to re-establish political discipline, including by persuading students to return to school and subjecting them to the authority of strong local civic associations which included representations for elders.

Moreover, historians of South Africa's trade union movement often view the Vaal uprising as an inflection point in the politicisation (or re-politicisation) of the major trade unions. According to Eddie Webster, the November 1984 stay-away marked "the beginning of united mass action between organised labour, students and community organisations". The Charterist Congress of South African Trade Unions was founded in late 1985 and went on to play a crucial role in the Mass Democratic Movement.

=== Conflict between black groups ===
In the late 1980s and early 1990s, supporters of the UDF, ANC, and aligned militias were, in some areas, involved in prolonged low-intensity conflict with a constellation of various other militias: some independent, others state-sponsored, and many aligned to the rival Inkatha. In some accounts, this development was directly linked to events during the Vaal uprising: as the United Nations High Commissioner for Refugees observed in 1996, the uprising had led to the formation of local vigilantes and in some cases to territorial conflicts between them. "A degree of conflict between black groups" was already a feature of the uprising by 1985. In addition, the uprising also involved the seeds of hostility between UDF supporters and Inkatha, with Inkatha leader Mangosuthu Buthelezi stridently condemning the uprising's leaders and encouraging his supporters to retaliate against the perpetrators of violence.

=== Opposition to conscription ===
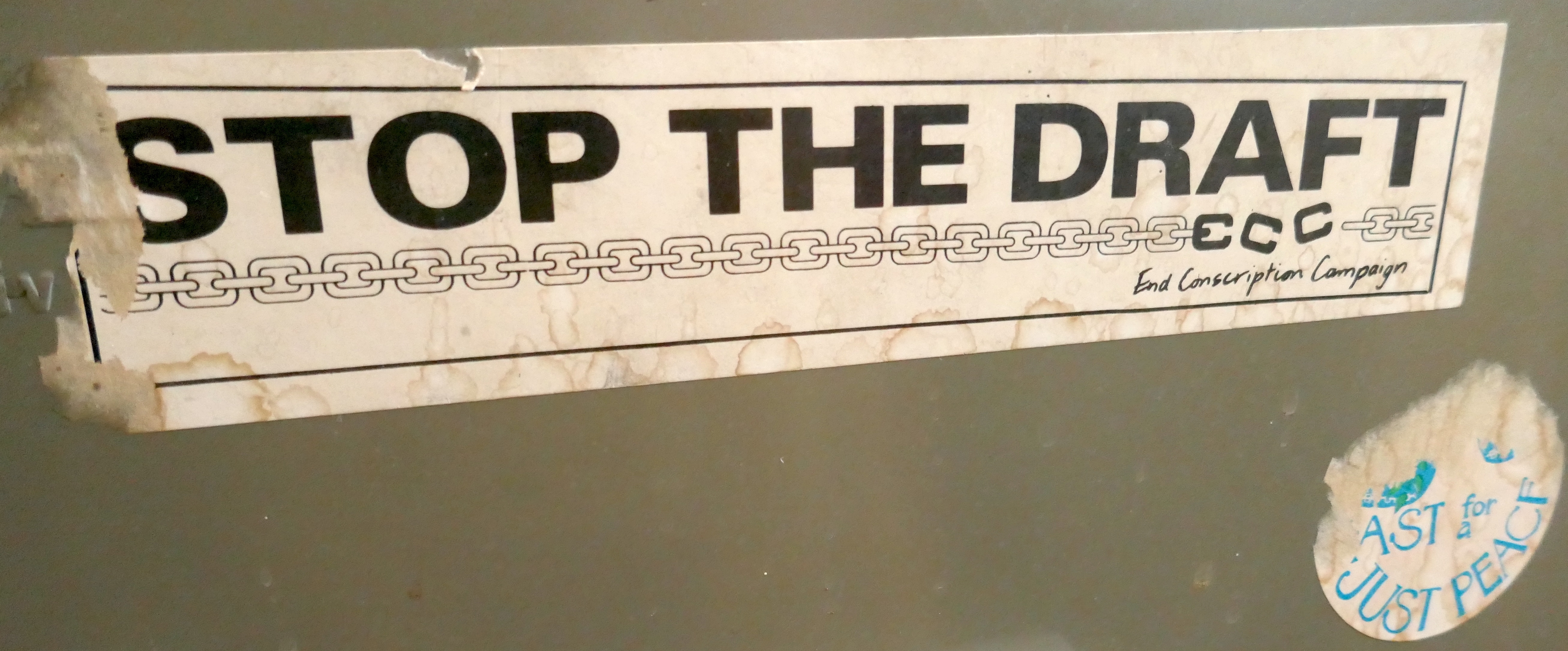
A sticker of the End Conscription Campaign

Finally, in addition to stoking international concern, the deployment of the military to quell the uprising was a polarising issue among the government's white constituents. The white liberal Progressive Federal Party had warned from the outset of Operation Palmiet that an expanded role for SADF in domestic policing would increase resistance to conscription, and this warning was borne out in the subsequence increase in conscientious objections and the rise of the End Conscription Campaign.

== See also ==
- Goldstone Commission
- Truth and Reconciliation Commission
- History of the African National Congress
