= Tom Manthata =

South African activist (1939–2020)

Tom Manthata OLG
- Born: Thomas Madikwe Manthata; 29 November 1939; Soekmekaar, Transvaal; Union of South Africa
- Died: 10 July 2020 (aged 80); Pretoria, Gauteng; Republic of South Africa
- Education: University of South Africa
- Political party: Azanian People's Organisation

Thomas Madikwe Manthata (29 November 1939 – 10 July 2020) was a South African activist who was active in the anti-apartheid movement. After the end of apartheid, he served as a member both of the Truth and Reconciliation Commission and of the South African Human Rights Commission.

During apartheid, Manthata was a teacher in Soweto and worked for the South African Council of Churches. A stalwart of the Black Consciousness movement, he was a founding member and one-time general secretary of the Azanian People's Organisation. He was one of the defendants in the Delmas Treason Trial and in November 1988 was convicted of treason for his political activity. He served one year of a six-year sentence before the verdict was overturned on appeal in 1989.

== Early life and activism ==
Manthata was born on 29 November 1939 in Soekmekaar in the former Northern Transvaal. In 1967, after being expelled from a Catholic seminary, he began teaching at Sekano Ntoane High School in Soweto outside Johannesburg, where his students included Amos Masondo and future president Cyril Ramaphosa. During the same period, he also studied part-time at the University of South Africa (UNISA) and became active in the burgeoning Black Consciousness movement, initially through the South African Students' Organisation. He used his connections with the Black Consciousness movement to facilitate the political education of his high school students.

From 1974, he worked at the South African Council of Churches (SACC), primarily involved with assisting the families of political detainees. Three years after that, in 1977, the apartheid government severely prohibited Black Consciousness organising, banning all of the movement's major organisations in the aftermath of the Soweto uprising. Manthata subsequently became a founding member of the Azanian People's Organisation (AZAPO), where he later served as general secretary. He was detained for his political activity on several occasions.

== Delmas Treason Trial ==
In June 1985 he became one of 22 activists indicted in the Delmas Treason Trial, accused of having committed treason by inciting the 1984 uprising in the Vaal Triangle. Desmond Tutu, then the general secretary of the SACC, later said that Manthata had only been in the Vaal to monitor the protests on his orders. Nonetheless, on 18 November 1988, Manthata – with Moss Chikane, Popo Molefe, and Mosiuoa Lekota of the United Democratic Front – was among the four defendants convicted of treason. Tutu published an op-ed in Manthata's defence in the New York Times, writing:

If there is one person in South Africa for whom I would unhesitatingly put my head on a block, it is Tom Manthata. Tom is a person who, after being tortured while in police custody, after spending more than 200 days detained without trial, after being in 'preventive detention' for nearly a year, came out of prison to say to his friends in the council: 'Let's not be consumed by bitterness.'

On 8 December, Manthata was sentenced to serve six years in prison; the judge said that he had imposed a lenient sentence in the hope that Manthata would assume a constructive leadership role once released. However, he served only one year: on 15 December 1989, the sentence was overturned by the Supreme Court of Appeal on a technicality.

== Post-apartheid career ==
After the abolition of apartheid in 1994, Manthata served as a commissioner in the Truth and Reconciliation Commission. He was also a commissioner at the South African Human Rights Commission, initially for the province of the Eastern Cape; he began a seven-year term as a national commissioner in October 2002, under chairperson Jody Kollapen.

== Personal life and death ==
Manthata died of COVID-19-related illness at One Military Hospital outside Pretoria on 10 July 2020. He was married. In November 2021, he was posthumously awarded the Order of Luthuli in Gold by President Cyril Ramaphosa, "for his active participation in human rights matters, ranging from the rights of the elderly and land issues to traditional leadership".
