= Make South Africa ungovernable =

South African political slogan

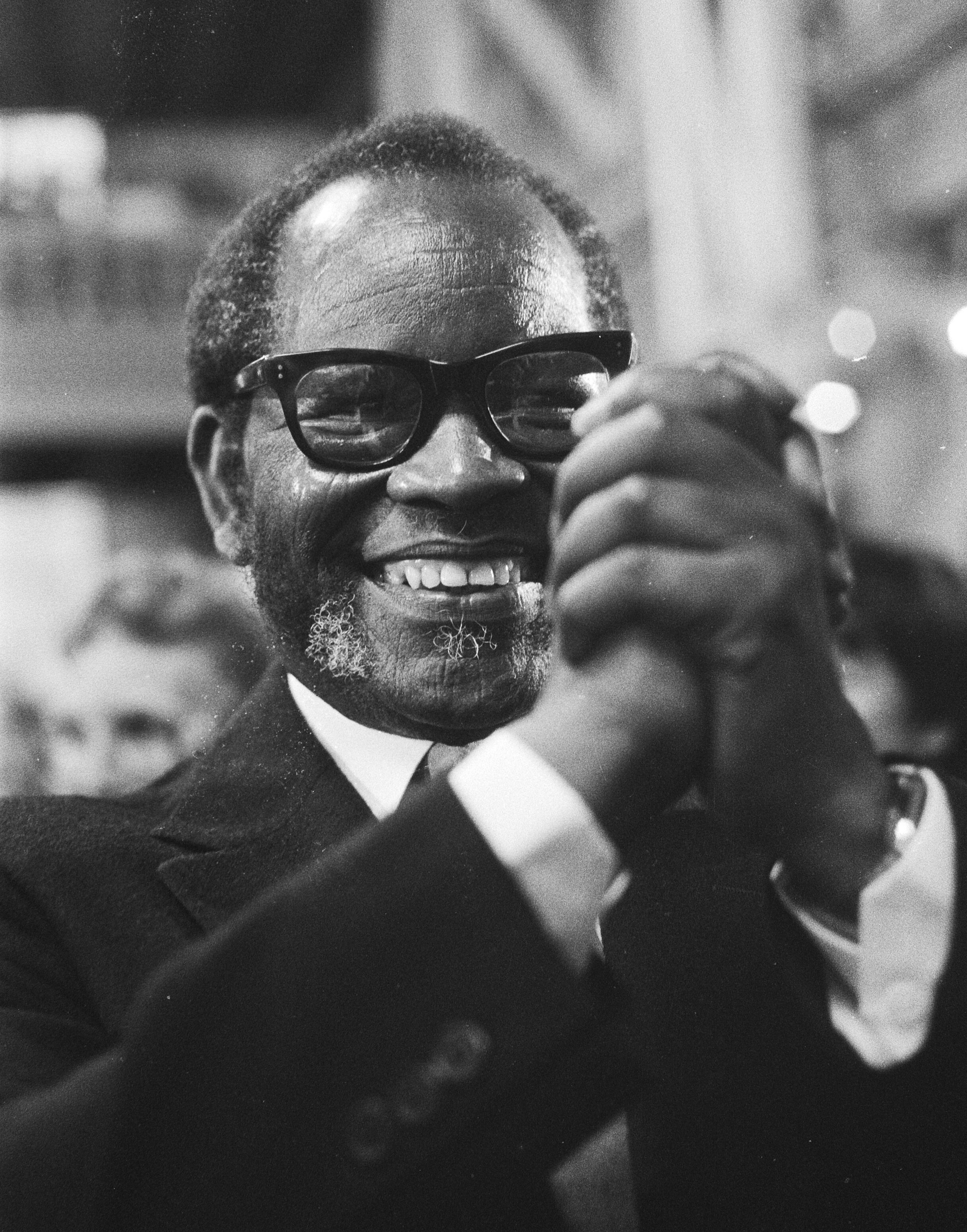
African National Congress leader Oliver Tambo popularised the slogan

"Make South Africa ungovernable" was a political slogan of the anti-apartheid movement in South Africa. It is closely associated with mass mobilisation against apartheid in the mid-to-late 1980s. The slogan originated in a series of speeches by African National Congress (ANC) leader Oliver Tambo in 1984 and 1985, but it was adopted inside South Africa by the supporters of the United Democratic Front and associated civic organisations.

The slogan conveyed a rhetorical rejection of illegitimate state authority and a strategic endorsement of mass mobilisation, which the ANC viewed as a prelude to democratic revolution. Critics of the campaign claimed that it legitimised political violence and vigilantism and permanently undermined acceptance of state authority in South Africa.

== Origins ==
The desideratum of making South Africa ungovernable originated with Oliver Tambo, the exiled leader of the African National Congress (ANC). On 8 January 1984, delivering his annual January Eighth Statement from Lusaka, Zambia, Tambo told the ANC's supporters:

We must begin to use our accumulated strength to destroy the organs of government of the apartheid regime. We have to undermine and weaken its control over us, exactly by frustrating its attempts to control us. We should direct our collective might to rendering the enemy's instruments of authority unworkable. To march forward must mean that we advance against the regime's organs of state-power, creating conditions in which the country becomes increasingly ungovernable [emphasis added].

This sentiment was subsequently refined into the dual imperatives of making (or rendering) South Africa ungovernable and making apartheid unworkable. Tambo repeated the call to "make South Africa ungovernable" in other broadcasts on Radio Freedom, including on 10 October 1984, 8 January 1985, and 22 July 1985. It also appeared on ANC propaganda materials distributed inside South Africa. According to Mark Gevisser, the formulation was coined by Thabo Mbeki, who was Tambo's political secretary and speechwriter.

In global terms, it was in South Africa that "ungovernability" reached the height of its popularity as a political conceit, but it had been used elsewhere before 1984, most notably in the Northern Irish Troubles. In 1971 Irish republican Ruairí Ó Brádaigh argued that Sinn Féin must make Northern Ireland ungovernable as a prelude to achieving a United Ireland.

== Significance in the anti-apartheid movement ==
Our own tasks are very clear. To bring about the kind of society that is visualised in the Freedom Charter, we have to break down and destroy the old order. We have to make apartheid unworkable and our country ungovernable. The accomplishment of these tasks will create the situation for us to overthrow the apartheid regime and for power to pass into the hands of the people as a whole.

— Oliver Tambo on Radio Freedom in July 1985

Both in ANC materials and in practice, the ungovernability campaign was associated with a continued rejection of black local authorities and other instruments of the apartheid state's authority, including through boycotts of rents and other municipal charges, boycotts of Bantu Education institutions, and ongoing mass demonstrations. Many of these tactics were the established methods of the United Democratic Front (UDF) and local civic organisations, and they were at the centre of the Vaal uprising, which began in September 1984 and spread to townships across the country. Ungovernability also encompassed labour organisation under the trade unions, which R. W. Johnson said were "used as a battering ram in the struggle to 'make South Africa ungovernable'".

In many cases, discredited state institutions were replaced by an alternative civic infrastructure, including street committees and people's courts; the ANC called these "organs of people's power". Thus according to Molemo Moiloa, the slogan of ungovernability was used to claim "a tradition of self-determination and collective responsibility", as well as to express the right to defy illegitimate authority.

The ANC intimidated that its armed wing, Umkhonto we Sizwe (MK), would use military means to spread ungovernability to white areas of South Africa: announcing a civil war on Radio Freedom on 1 March 1986, MK commissar Chris Hani said that MK was "gearing itself to step up activity in white areas so that the entire country should be ungovernable". In practice, however, ungovernability was an organised military strategy only insofar as it overstretched the apartheid security forces by increasing the burden of policing black areas.

=== Role of the African National Congress ===
By the time of the ANC's National Consultative Conference in Kabwe, Zambia in July 1985, making South Africa ungovernable was a recognised element of the ANC's quasi-Maoist strategy of "a people's war for seizure of power." The organisation said that it adopted and advocated the strategy of ungovernability in 1984 and 1985 out of the recognition that the anti-apartheid struggle had reached "a critical stage".

The apartheid state largely subscribed to the notion that ungovernability was a coordinated strategy instigated and overseen by the ANC and its allies. In 1988 in the Delmas Treason Trial, the Supreme Court's Transvaal Division convicted three UDF leaders of treason on the grounds that, on the instructions of the ANC, they had "formulated and executed a policy of mass organisation whilst fomenting a revolutionary climate... intended to make South Africa ungovernable".

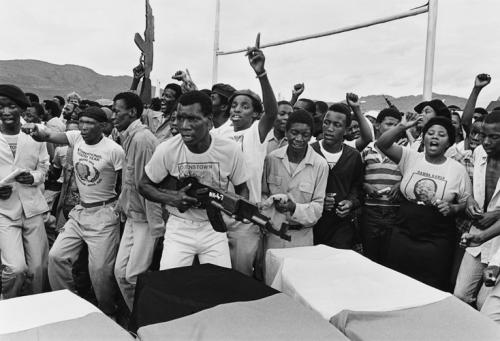
The mass funeral for victims of the Queenstown Massacre, December 1985

However, the ANC was exiled outside South Africa during the 1980s, and, despite its symbolic political importance, it lacked practical organisational reach, especially in comparison to civic organisations. Contemporary historians agree that the ANC's calls to ungovernability were not the primary provocation to mass resistance in the late 1980s, though they were an endorsement of the same. In most analyses, the ANC "in a sense simply recorded what was already happening outside of its control: spontaneous mass mobilisation", or at most created "formal strategy" from and in response to an ascendant "organic practice". In Anthony Butler's phrase, the ANC's campaign was an attempt "to place the ANC at the head of an [already] unfolding social revolution". However, the ANC's rallying cry may also have inspired protestors, especially the more militant among them, by emphasising the revolutionary potential of the ongoing protests, their spontaneity notwithstanding.

=== Criticism ===
Critics linked ungovernability to the rise of vigilantism and political violence that was a feature of the Vaal uprising and aftermath. Indeed, in a December 1986 interview with Sechaba, which the ANC later endorsed in a submission to the Truth and Reconciliation Commission, MK commissar Hani said that the ANC was sympathetic to the use of necklacing as part of "an attempt to render our townships, to render our areas and country ungovernable". Some of the perpetrators said publicly during the period that they viewed their acts of political violence as direct responses to the ANC's call to make South Africa ungovernable.

Mangosuthu Buthelezi of Inkatha, the conservative movement which ruled the bantustan of KwaZulu, opposed the rhetoric and strategy of ungovernability while supporting the aim of ending apartheid. In 2012, Buthelezi explained his view in a reflective op-ed, writing:

We disagreed that young South Africans could justifiably be asked to forfeit their education and burn down their schools, for they would be forfeiting their future even in a democratic South Africa. Take away a community's hope, make them live in dread in their homes, let fear keep their children out of school, ravage their neighbourhood, wrecking what little they have, break down the structures of authority so they feel there is no recourse and no one to help them. This is what it means to make a community ungovernable.

In some accounts, the ungovernability campaign had permanent effects on South African political culture by undermining state authority and legitimating violent protest. Graeme Simpson of the Centre for the Study of Violence and Reconciliation suggested in 1992 that ungovernability and related motifs had contributed to a lasting culture of violence insofar as they accorded violence "social acceptability as a legitimate means of attaining change". In her 2009 book People's War, Anthea Jeffery of the Institute of Race Relations said that ungovernability rhetoric was "a major factor in the persistent vandalism, destructive protests and seeming contempt for authority that persist to this day".

== Post-apartheid discourse ==
Post-apartheid politicians and activists have repeated the slogan, particularly as a means of invoking a connection to the historical anti-apartheid movement. Among other notable examples, #FeesMustFall activists called for student protestors to make South African university campuses ungovernable, and the July 2021 wave of civil unrest was preceded by threats that Jacob Zuma's allies would make South Africa ungovernable if Zuma was arrested.

== See also ==
- Amandla (power)
- Defiance Campaign
- History of the African National Congress
- Mass Democratic Movement
- Service delivery protests (South Africa)
- Consent of the governed
- Tax resistance
- No taxation without representation
- James C. Scott
