= Masedi ZA =

South African hip-hop recording artist

- Born: Masedi Mokhothu
- Origin: Vaal Triangle, South Africa
- Genres: Hip hop, Trap
- Occupations: Rapper, songwriter
- Years active: 2014–present

Masedi ZA (born Masedi Mokhothu) is a South African hip-hop recording artist and rapper from the Vaal Triangle region. He is known for blending contemporary trap music with local vernacular influences. In 2025, he signed a distribution deal with Universal Music to expand the reach of his music.

== Early life and education ==
Masedi ZA was born on 31 July 1991 and raised in the Vaal Triangle in South Africa. He attended Selbourne Primary School in Vereeniging and matriculated at Suncrest High School in Vanderbijlpark. Masedi holds a BCom Accounting degree from the University of Johannesburg.

== Career ==
Masedi began making music as a teenager and developed his lyrical style from township influences and local storytelling traditions. He then began to releasing music publicly in 2014. His early breakthrough came from the single Sho! which gained local radio attention and online momentum. He has been credited with helping spotlight the Vaal hip-hop movement through his energetic trap-driven sound and his representation of local cultural identity. In 2025, he premiered his mixtape Trap Ya Milano using a cinematic format at Ster-Kinekor, Vaal Mall, blending film and live performance.

Masedi later secured a distribution deal with Universal Music, which he described as a strategic step that would elevate the Vaal music scene internationally.

== Artistry ==
Masedi is known for blending trap beats with Sesotho and township idioms. His musical style is described as energetic, narrative-driven, and reflective of Vaal urban culture.

== Discography ==
=== Mixtapes ===
- Sedi Laka 2023
- Trap Ya Milano (2025)

=== Singles ===
- Sho! (2018)

== See also ==
- Music of South Africa
- South African hip hop
