= Pan African Bar Association of South Africa =

South African association of advocates

- Abbreviation: PABASA
- Formation: 31 October 2018
- Founders: Muzi Sikhakhane (chairperson); Nasreen Rajab-Budlender (deputy chairperson); Xoliswa Sibeko (secretary); Elizabeth Baloyi-Mere (deputy secretary); Tembeka Ngcukaitobi; Matthew Chaskalson; Steven Budlender (treasurer); Isabel Goodman; Dali Mpofu; Gcina Malindi; Nomgcobo Jiba; Dumisa Ntsebeza; Vuyani Ngalwana; Sha'ista Kazee; Cathy Mhango
- Type: Bar council
- Purpose: Promote diversity and inclusion in the South African legal profession; Tackle systemic racism and gender bias
- Headquarters: Johannesburg, South Africa
- Region served: South Africa
- Members: 70 prospective members (at launch in 2018)
- Official language: English
- Website: https://www.pabasa.org.za

Pan African Bar Association of South Africa (PABASA) is a bar association.

It was founded on 31 October 2018 in Johannesburg to address systemic race and gender inequality within the South African legal profession. Its members focus on promoting black and female advocates in areas traditionally dominated by white males, such as commercial, tax, and construction law.

== Mass resignation ==
In July 2025, PABASA experienced internal turmoil, with 45 advocates resigning abruptly and 36 submitting letters, alleging that the organisation had become "politicised" and strayed from its founding principles of fair and merit-based advocacy.
