= Caroline Nicholls =

South African judge

The Honourable Caroline Nicholls

Judge of the Supreme Court of Appeal
- Incumbent
- Assumed office 1 June 2019
- Appointed by: Cyril Ramaphosa

Judge of the High Court
- In office 1 September 2009 – 31 May 2019
- Appointed by: Jacob Zuma
- Division: Gauteng

Personal details
- Born: 28 November 1956 (age 69) Natal Province, Union of South Africa
- Spouse: Gcina Malindi
- Education: St. Anne's College
- Alma mater: University of Cape Town

Caroline Elizabeth Heaton Nicholls (born 28 November 1956) is a South African judge of the Supreme Court of Appeal. Formerly a human rights lawyer, she was a judge of the Johannesburg High Court from September 2009 until June 2019, when she was appointed to the Supreme Court of Appeal.

== Early life and education ==
Nicholls was born on 28 November 1956 in present-day KwaZulu-Natal. She matriculated at St. Anne's College in 1973 and attended the University of Cape Town, where she completed a BA in 1976 and an LLB in 1978.

== Career as an attorney ==
Between 1981 and 1983, Nicholls completed her articles of clerkship in the Johannesburg law offices of Priscilla Jana, a prominent human rights attorney. She was admitted as an attorney on 2 February 1984 and spent the next three decades in private practice in Johannesburg. Her practice consisted of human rights litigation, often on behalf of anti-apartheid activists, such as the defendants of the Delmas Treason Trial; later in her career, she appeared at the Goldstone Commission and the Truth and Reconciliation Commission. In the latter case, she instructed George Bizos on behalf of the South African Communist Party and the family of the party's assassinated leader, Chris Hani. She joined the National Association of Democratic Lawyers in 1988 and served on its national executive committee between 2001 and 2003.

In 2008, while still practicing as an attorney, Nicholls joined the Aspirant Women Judges Programme, which aimed to elevate women to the bench of the High Court of South Africa. After completing the programme later that year, she was invited to serve as an acting judge in the Johannesburg High Court.

== Gauteng High Court: 2009–2019 ==
In July 2009, the Judicial Service Commission interviewed Nicholls as a candidate for permanent appointment to the Gauteng Division of the High Court. She was recommended for appointment and joined the bench on 1 September 2009. Among other prominent decisions, Nicholls ruled that a Carte Blanche segment had defamed Gold Reef City in 2011, ordered CSR E-loco to disclose its beneficial ownership to amaBhungane journalists in 2013, and ordered M-Net to reinstate Gareth Cliff as a judge on Idols South Africa in 2016.

Nicholls also served lengthy stints as an acting judge in higher courts. She was an acting judge in the Supreme Court of Appeal twice between October 2016 and November 2018, in which capacity she wrote a concurring opinion in Dombo Community v Tshakhuma Community Trust and Others, a Land Claims Court matter. Later, between February and June 2019, she acted in the Constitutional Court.

== Supreme Court of Appeal: 2022–present ==
In February 2019, the Judicial Service Commission shortlisted Nicholls for permanent appointment to one of five vacancies on the Supreme Court of Appeal. During her interview in April, Nicholls said that she had been "made to feel unwanted, incompetent and incapable" during her first acting stint on the Supreme Court, but that the environment had improved during the tenure of Judge President Mandisa Maya.

The Judicial Service Commission recommended Nicholls's appointment, which was confirmed by President Cyril Ramaphosa later the same year. She joined the Supreme Court of Appeal on 1 June 2019. While serving on the bench, she is also an assistant vice-president at the South African chapter of the International Association of Women Judges.

== Personal life ==
She is married to Gcina Malindi, with whom she has three daughters. She met Malindi, who is a lawyer and former anti-apartheid activist, when she represented him at the Delmas Treason Trial of 1985.
