= Sikhakhane Commission =

South African enquiry (2014)

The Sikhakhane Commission
- Date: 1 September – 5 November 2014
- Duration: 3 months
- Also known as: SARS Rogue Unit Inquiry
- Budget: Unknown
- Participants: Muzi Sikhakhane (chairperson); South African Revenue Service (SARS); Johann van Loggerenberg
- Outcome: Recommended further investigation into the SARS covert unit; Found the unit may have operated unlawfully

The Sikhakhane Commission was an independent inquiry into allegations of inappropriate and possibly unlawful conduct by a covert investigative unit within the South African Revenue Service (SARS), which focused specifically on former SARS Group Executive Johann van Loggerenberg.

The inquiry was established in 2014 by acting SARS commissioner Ivan Pillay in response to growing media scrutiny and internal concerns over the operations of a so-called 'rogue unit' allegedly engaged in unlawful surveillance and intelligence gathering on politicians for the purposes of smearing them as the factional battles and power struggle in the African National Congress (ANC) ensured. According to media reports, the unit spied on various politicians like Jacob Zuma, Fikile Mbalula and Julius Malema. At the center of the controversy was van Loggerenberg, a senior SARS official, whose conduct was also under review concerning the operation of the intelligence unit.

== Background ==
In September 2014, in the wake of serious media reports about a 'rogue unit' within the government revenue agency conducting illegal intelligence operations, Pillay, as the acting head of SARS established a panel to examine the conduct of senior officials, particularly van Loggerenberg and appointed Sikhakhane to chair the enquiry.

The Commission was mandated to assess whether:

- a covert SARS unit was lawfully instituted and operated,
- there had been breaches of confidentiality under the Tax Administration Act,
- information had been intercepted or leaked illegally,
- senior officials (notably van Loggerenberg) had engaged in conflict of interest, corruption, or impropriety.

Sikhakhane and his team examined internal records, interviewed personnel and reviewed media reports surrounding the alleged unit and its activities.

== Findings and criticism ==
The Commission's report, submitted in November 2014, concluded that:

- the covert unit had been unlawfully formed and operated outside SARS's legal mandate,
- it created a “climate of intrigue, fear and subterfuge” within the organisation,
- there was prima facie evidence of abuse of power, statutory conflict with intelligence services, and violations of internal HR policies.

The report recommended a deeper forensic investigation, a judicial commission of inquiry, and coordination with state intelligence agencies.

Following Sikhakhane’s findings, SARS suspended implicated executives and referred them for disciplinary action. SARS commissioner Tom Moyane subsequently engaged KPMG to conduct a R23 million forensic inquiry based on Sikhakhane’s recommendations. However, by November 2020 SARS announced it would no longer rely on the Sikhakhane report due to concerns over its objectivity.

Although the report initially prompted significant institutional changes, its findings later became contested. Some observers argue it contributed meaningfully to oversight at SARS, while others dismiss it as politically motivated and flawed.

=== Criticism and apologies ===
In September 2017, auditing firm KPMG, which first came with the allegations of the existence of the surveillance unit, formally withdrew its findings and recommendations related to the existence of the SARS "rogue unit", admitting serious lapses in the process of gathering the information. The firm apologized to former Finance Minister Pravin Gordhan, stating that the report had wrongly implied his knowledge of illegal operations and that its legal conclusions fell outside KPMG’s mandate.

In August 2019, former Sunday Times journalist Malcolm Rees publicly apologised to van Loggerenberg for the role he played in writing false narratives about the so-called "rogue unit" - an apology added to growing criticism that the Sikhakhane Commission’s findings had contributed to reputational damage based on incomplete or flawed evidence.

In November 2022, SARS Commissioner Edward Kieswetter issued a formal public apology to employees who were adversely affected by internal actions taken between 2014 and 2018, explicitly acknowledging the harm caused by reliance on flawed investigations, including the Sikhakhane and KPMG reports. Kieswetter stated that both investigations were "deeply flawed" and "should not have been used as a basis for any of the actions taken against some SARS officials." The apology marked the completion of a broader reparation process, as recommended by the Nugent Commission, which had identified systemic governance failures under Moyane's leadership. SARS reaffirmed that it would not use the Sikhakhane Report for any future purpose Although the Sikhakhane Commission and KPMG’s reports formed the basis for disciplinary action against several SARS employees, including those implicated in the so-called “rogue unit,” it later faced significant criticism. Moyane stated that in fact the SARS disciplinary decisions were based on the Sikhakhane report, not on the KPMG report, even after KPMG publicly withdrew its own findings and apologized for it. Moyane criticized KPMG for damaging SARS' credibility by withdrawing a report that SARS had relied upon for years, and announced intentions to pursue legal action against the audit firm. He also stated that some of the disciplined employees had "confessed" to him directly, reinforcing the internal validity SARS attached to the Sikhakhane findings.

=== Legal fallout ===
In a significant legal development, the High Court in Pretoria set aside the Public Protector’s findings on the SARS “rogue unit” in December 2020. The report, issued by Public Protector Busisiwe Mkhwebane in 2019, had concluded that the unit - established during Gordhan’s tenure as SARS commissioner - violated the South African Constitution. However, the full bench of the High Court reviewed and declared the Public Protector's findings unlawful and invalid with the judgment further finding that her decision to entertain the complaints that led to the report was itself unlawful.
