= Gcina Malindi =

South African lawyer and activist

The Honourable Gcina Malindi

Judge of the High Court
- Incumbent
- Assumed office 1 July 2021
- Appointed by: Cyril Ramaphosa
- Division: Gauteng

Personal details
- Born: Petrus Gcinumuzi Malindi
- Party: African National Congress (until February 2016)
- Spouse: Caroline Nicholls
- Education: University of the Witwatersrand
- Occupation: Judge; advocate; anti-apartheid activist

Petrus Gcinumuzi Malindi is a South African judge of the High Court of South Africa. He was appointed to the Gauteng Division in July 2021 after 25 years as a practising advocate, during which time he was well known for his association with the African National Congress. He was admitted to the Johannesburg Bar in 1995 and took silk in 2010. During apartheid, he rose to prominence as an anti-apartheid activist and defendant in the Delmas Treason Trial, which led to his conviction for terrorism and his imprisonment on Robben Island.

== Anti-apartheid activism ==
Malindi became involved in the anti-apartheid movement while in high school. He rose to prominence as one of the defendants in the Delmas Treason Trial, a lengthy political trial that was held in the Supreme Court of South Africa between 1985 and 1988; he was Accused Number Five. In December 1988, when the trial concluded, Malindi was sentenced to five years in prison for terrorism; the judge said that his sentence was exacerbated by a prior conviction for public violence. After a year on Robben Island, he and the others were freed in December 1989, when their convictions were overturned on appeal.

== Legal career ==
After his release from prison, Malindi studied law at the encouragement of his wife and other lawyers. He attended the University of the Witwatersrand, graduating in 1994 with a BA and LLB. He completed his pupillage in 1995 and, in July 1995, he was admitted to the Johannesburg Bar as an advocate. One of his first major briefs was serving as junior counsel to George Bizos in hearings of the Amnesty Committee of the Truth and Reconciliation Commission, including on behalf of the family of assassinated political activist Chris Hani. He took silk in 2010.

His practice areas included labour law, competition law, and administrative and constitutional law, and his clients included his political party, the African National Congress (ANC); in 2011, he and Andries Nel were the ANC's quasi-prosecutors in the internal disciplinary hearings which resulted in Julius Malema's expulsion from the party. Shortly afterwards, Malindi and Muzi Sikhakhane represented the ANC and President Jacob Zuma in their abortive 2012 lawsuit against the Goodman Gallery and City Press, an attempt to have The Spear, a provocative painting of Zuma, banned from public display. In May 2012, in a widely televised court hearing, Malindi famously broke down in tears during questioning by Judge Neels Claassen. The court ordered the media not to broadcast images of Malindi's outburst, and Malindi explained afterwards that, "I was just overcome by emotions and there is a history to it as a former activist."

He was a member of Advocates for Transformation, and he served on the executive committee of the National Association of Democratic Lawyers as well as, from 1998 to 2002, as a member of the Johannesburg Bar Council.

== Judicial nominations ==
On several occasions since 2010, Malindi has served as an acting judge in the Gauteng Division of the High Court of South Africa, sitting at its seats both in Pretoria and in Johannesburg. The Judicial Service Commission has also interviewed him as a candidate for possible permanent appointment to the Gauteng High Court bench.

In October 2016, he was shortlisted and interviewed for one of six vacancies arising at the Gauteng High Court. Hendrik Schmidt and Julius Malema, both members of the panel and both opposition politicians (of the Democratic Alliance and Economic Freedom Fighters respectively), raised Malindi's political commitments, questioning whether they might create the perception of judicial bias. Malindi said that he had allowed his ANC membership to lapse in February 2016 and that his judgement would not be "clouded by political affiliation". Later in the interview, when Malindi grew emotional answering another question, Chief Justice Mogoeng Mogoeng asked whether his ability to control his emotions was "an area of challenge" for him. The Judicial Service Commission did not recommend Malindi for appointment, leading Senior Counsel Muzi Sikhakhane and Tembeka Ngcukaitobi to publish a defence of Malindi in the City Press, alleging that he had been overlooked because he was an "activist lawyer". The Economic Freedom Fighters, through its spokesperson Mbuyiseni Ndlozi, later accused the ANC government of attempting to punish the Judicial Service Commission's independent-minded members for their "refusal to appoint" Malindi to the bench.

In April 2021, Malindi was among the 13 candidates shortlisted and interviewed for six new vacancies in the Gauteng High Court. During the interview, Malindi pointed out that it had been four-and-a-half years since his last appearance before the panel, which he said was "more than long enough to allay any fears that I come here as being supplanted from Luthuli House". He also expressed his support for judicial activism. After the interviews, Malindi was one of the six candidates whom the Judicial Service Commission recommended for appointment.

== Gauteng High Court: 2021–present ==
President Cyril Ramaphosa confirmed his appointment to the bench with effect from 1 July 2021.

== Personal life ==
Malindi is married to Caroline Nicholls, a judge and former attorney; they met when she was part of his defence team at the Delmas Treason Trial, then serving as an attorney under Priscilla Jana. Their first daughter was born in January 1989, while Malindi was imprisoned, and another of Malindi's lawyers, George Bizos, became her godfather.

In 1998, Malindi was the master of ceremonies at activist Simon Nkoli's funeral in Johannesburg; he had been friends with Nkoli, another Delmas Treason Triallist, since high school.
