= Stay-away =

A stay away, also known as a stay-away or stayaway, is a form of general strike where people are told to "stay away" from work. This term has often been used in local communications when organizing various strike actions in Zimbabwe between the end of 1997 and recent unsuccessful attempts in 2022.

== In Zimbabwe ==
Stay Away is a form of non-violent strike action that began occurring in Zimbabwe in response to economic and societal failures by Robert Mugabe's government in the mid-1990s and onward.

According to SW Radio Africa, this form of protest has the support of all major civic bodies in the country. It calls for a solid one- or two-day "stay away" from work to protest in a manner that will not expose people to the violence and intimidation of the police and the army. Stay-away campaigns are often communicated through e-mail and text messaging.

"Just stay at home - do your buying on Wednesday and then take a 4-day break. Do not go out if you can avoid it as there may be trouble and the safest place for you is at home."

== In South Africa ==
In 1950, as part of its Programme of Action the African National Congress (ANC) in coordination with the South African Indian Congress, the African People's Organization, and the Communist Party of South Africa organized the May Day Strike. It was a one day stay-away on May Day to protest low wages, the banning of Communist leaders and the further plans to ban the Communist party by the South African government.

Stay aways were also used by organizers of the South African insurrection of 1984–1986, with over 40 stay aways used in 1985 and 1986 alone. Between August 1984 and December 1986, four times more political work stoppages were staged than in the entire preceding three and a half decades. In addition to school boycotts, general strikes and guerrilla action taken by the ANC, they made South Africa ungovernable and forced the Apartheid government to gradually reform until it was finally abolished in 1994.

== See also ==
- Apartheid
- African National Congress
- South Africa
