= Delmas Treason Trial =

1985–1988 trial of anti-apartheid activists

State v Baleka and Others
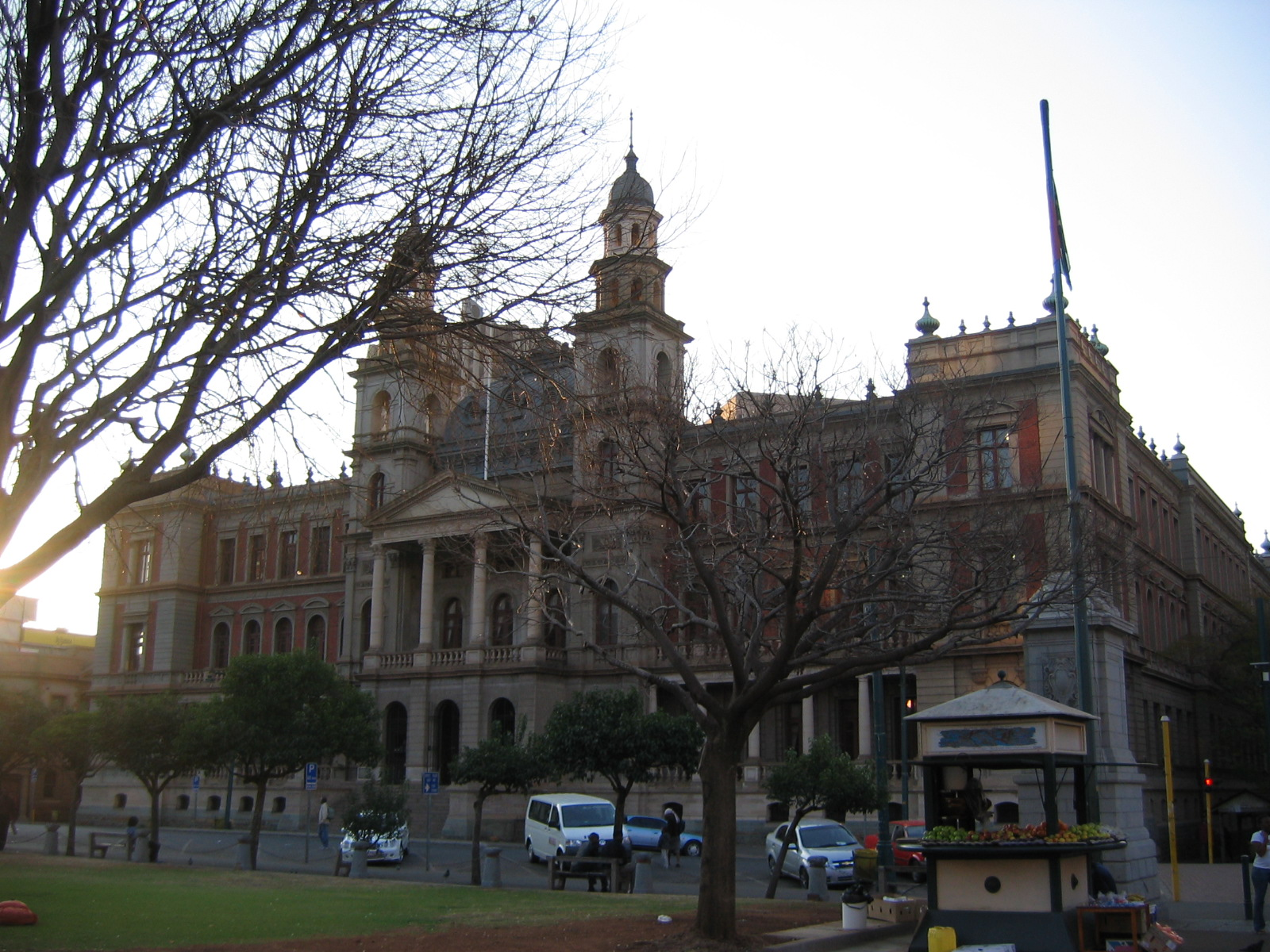
- The Palace of Justice in Pretoria
- Court: Supreme Court, Transvaal Division
- Started: 16 October 1985
- Decided: 18 November 1988
- Defendant: Patrick Baleka; Popo Molefe; Moss Chikane; Mosiuoa Lekota and 18 others

Case history
- Appealed to: Supreme Court of Appeal in State v Malindi and Others

The Delmas Treason Trial was heard in the Supreme Court of South Africa from 16 October 1985 to 18 November 1988. In one of the lengthiest political trials in South African history, the apartheid state pursued treason charges against 22 activists for their alleged role in instigating the 1984 Vaal uprising in the Vaal Triangle. The trial led to the conviction of Moses Chikane, Mosiuoa Lekota, Popo Molefe, and Tom Manthata on treason charges, and seven others were convicted of terrorism.

Formally State v Baleka and Others, the trial is nicknamed for the town of Delmas in the Eastern Transvaal, though it was concluded in Pretoria. It is commonly viewed as part of an attempt by the apartheid state to criminalise and suppress the United Democratic Front (UDF) and broader anti-apartheid movement. Most of the accused were members of the Vaal Civic Association, a UDF affiliate which had been involved in organising the protests that triggered the 1984 uprising. Three – Chikane, Lekota, and Molefe – were high-ranking UDF officials. Most were arrested in late 1984, indicted in June 1985, and released on bail by July 1987, though the three UDF leaders were refused bail throughout the trial.

Over the course of three years, the state presented its argument that the UDF had been established at the instigation of the outlawed African National Congress (ANC) and had henceforth become the ANC's co-conspirator in seeking to overthrow the state. The defendants were accused of having, through various non-violent political acts, sought to further the ANC's revolutionary aims, including by deliberately provoking revolt in the Vaal Triangle. Represented by Arthur Chaskalson and George Bizos, the defendants also denied alternative charges of common-purpose murder, terrorism, and other violations of the Internal Security Act.

Three of the accused were acquitted when the prosecution concluded its argument in November 1986, and a further eight were acquitted when Judge Kees van Dijkhorst handed down his verdict in November 1988. The remaining 11 were convicted and were sentenced on 8 December 1988. The three UDF leaders and one other were convicted of treason and sentenced to lengthy terms of imprisonment, while seven others were convicted of terrorism, for which two served prison sentences.

The verdict was overturned on appeal in State v Malindi and Others, handed down in the Supreme Court Appellate Division in Bloemfontein on 15 December 1989. The appeal succeeded on the narrow procedural ground that the trial judge had improperly removed an assessor from the case on the basis of his political sympathies. The 11 convicts were released six weeks before the ANC and other political organisations were unbanned to facilitate the progress of negotiations to end apartheid.

== Background ==
=== Vaal Uprising: September 1984 ===
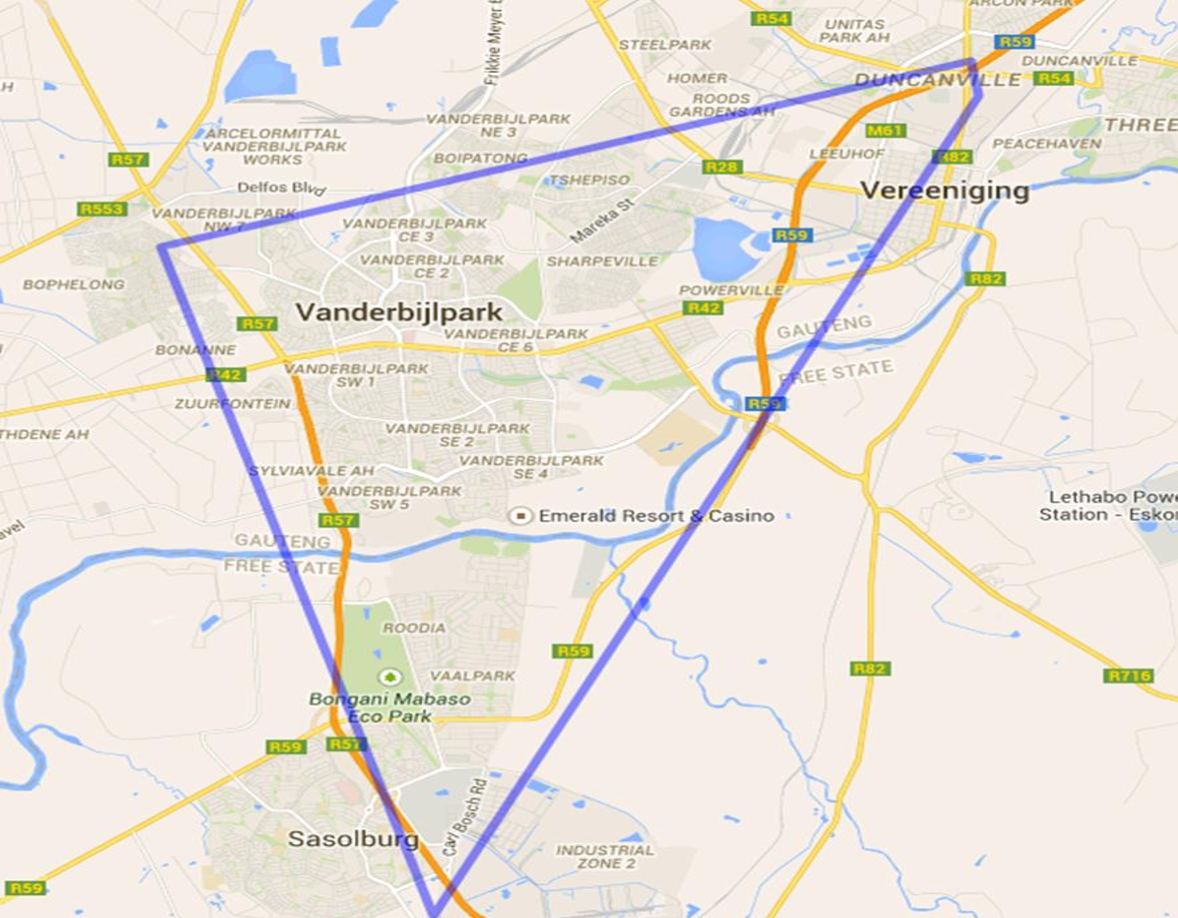
Map of the Vaal Triangle, south of Johannesburg

The Delmas Treason Trial was rooted most directly in events in September 1984 in the Vaal Triangle, an industrial area in the Southern Transvaal which included Boipatong, Sebokeng, Sharpeville, and other black townships. The events in question later were the opening salvo in the Vaal uprising, which constituted a period of unprecedented revolt by the townships' black residents against the South African government's system of apartheid.

In the early 1980s, the government of P. W. Botha had undertaken a package of political reforms, known as the Koornhof Bills, which established a Tricameral Parliament, purporting to provide political representation for Coloured and Indian South Africans, alongside Black local authorities, purporting to provide political representation for urban Black communities. At the national level, much of the political opposition to these reforms was led by the United Democratic Front (UDF), a network of civic and political organisations opposed to apartheid. In Vaal specifically, the group leading the opposition movement was the Vaal Civic Association, which was affiliated to the UDF but ideologically diverse. On 3 September 1984, shortly after the 1984 general election, the association organised demonstrations against black local authorities, who had recently imposed rent increases. The protests turned violent, leading, among other things, to the killing of black councillors and residents and to a prolonged period of civil unrest in the area.

Most of the defendants in the Delmas trial were arrested in the weeks after 3 September, as the unrest continued. Although the defendants were primarily activists in Vaal, their arrest was part of a wider-scale national crackdown on anti-apartheid groups, particularly the UDF and its affiliates; the same wave of arrests led also to the Pietermaritzburg Treason Trial and a handful of other political trials. The crackdown continued throughout the three-year trial, with the apartheid government instituting a series of states of emergency which restricted the activities of the UDF and other opposition groups.

=== Indictment: June 1985 ===
The 22 defendants were finally indicted in June 1985 on charges arising from events during the Vaal uprising; they appeared in court less than 24 hours later. The main charge against them was high treason, with alternative charges of terrorism, subversion, and furthering the aims of illegal organisations, all statutory offences under the Internal Security Act of 1982. They were also charged with five counts of murder in respect of the deaths of five black councillors in Vaal. The charges carried the death penalty.

After the indictment was filed, the Transvaal attorney general, using powers granted to him by the Internal Security Act, ordered the court to deny bail to all the accused; although the defence appealed the order, it was upheld. For much of the trial, the defendants were held at Modderbee Prison.

== Defendants ==
The Delmas defendants had diverse ideological backgrounds, but the vast majority were residents of black townships in the Vaal Triangle and members of the Vaal Civic Association, an affiliate of the UDF. In particular, three of the accused were high-ranking officials in the UDF: Mosiuoa Lekota (national publicity secretary), Moss Chikane (former Transvaal regional secretary), and Popo Molefe (national general secretary). However, another three of the accused were members or sympathisers of the Azanian People's Organisation, which generally had a strained relationship with the UDF and its allies. All of the accused were men.

The following is a list of all 22 defendants in the trial.

- Patrick Mabuya Baleka
- Oupa John Hlomuka
- Tebogo Geoffrey Moselane
- Mohapi Lazarus More
- Gcinumuzi Petrus Malindi
- Morake Petrus Mokoena
- Tsietsi David Mphuthi
- Naphtali Mbuti Nkopane
- Tebello Ephraim Ramakgula
- Bavumile Herbert Vilakazi
- Sekwati John Mokoena
- Mkhambi Amos Malindi
- Simon Tseko Nkoli
- Pelamotse Jerry Tlhopane
- Serame Jacob Hlanyane
- Thomas Madikwe Manthata
- Hlabeng Sam Matlole
- Maxala Simon Vilakazi
- Popo Simon Molefe
- Mosiuoa Patrick Lekota
- Moses Mabokela Chikane
- Thabiso Andrew Ratsomo

== Trial: 1985–1988 ==
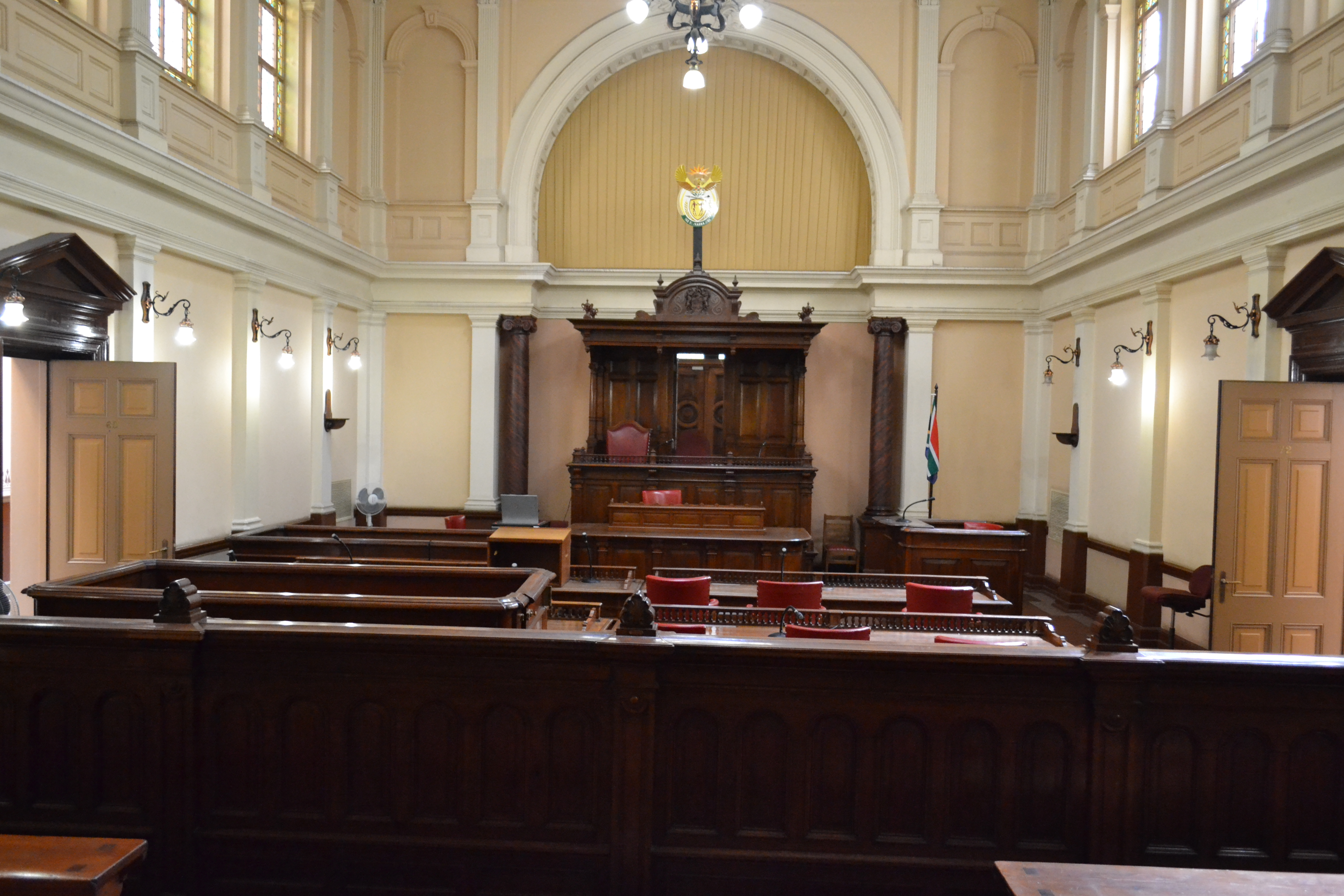
A courtroom in the Palace of Justice

The trial began on 16 October 1985 in the small town of Delmas in the Eastern Transvaal; from January 1986, it was heard at the Palace of Justice in downtown Pretoria, the seat of the Supreme Court Transvaal Division. The ultimate verdict was handed down in the same courtroom where Nelson Mandela was sentenced to life imprisonment in 1964. Presiding was Judge Kees van Dijkhorst, assisted on factual questions by two assessors, Willem Joubert and W. F. Kruger. The prosecution was led by P. B. Jacobs, P. Fick and W. Hanekom. Counsel for the defence were led by Arthur Chaskalson and also included George Bizos, Karel Tip, Gilbert Marcus, Zak Yacoob, and Ismail Mahomed.

The state expected the trial to last no longer than six months, but it became one of the longest political trials in South African history, partly because the large number of defendants. It was conducted over 37 months, with 437 days in the courtroom and court transcripts running to 27,194 pages; 278 witnesses were called and 1,556 documents were admitted as evidence. During that time, one of the youngest defendants, Lazarus More, was married in the same courtroom. Also during the trial, one of the defendants, Simon Nkoli, famously came out as gay, first to his co-accused and then publicly; his prison letters, primarily concerning his announcement and the reaction it received, were later published.

=== Arguments ===
==== Prosecution ====
The prosecution alleged that all 22 defendants were participants in a grand conspiracy against the apartheid state. At the most abstract level, it was alleged that the UDF had been formed as a vehicle for carrying out the purposes of the African National Congress (ANC) and South African Communist Party (SACP), anti-apartheid organisations which had been banned in South Africa since 1960 and operated in exile from headquarters in Lusaka, Zambia. According to the prosecution, the UDF had been founded in August 1983 at the direct instigation of ANC president Oliver Tambo, who the state said had called for ANC members inside South Africa to mobilise against the state. In other words, the UDF was alleged to be the "internal wing" of the ANC. The state claimed that "the UDF, its management, officialdom and members of organisations affiliated to the UDF and members of organisations that actively support the UDF" were all participants in a conspiracy whose ultimate aim was to overthrow the state.

More proximately, the prosecution alleged that the Delmas defendants had attempted to serve the ANC's revolutionary aims by instigating violence in the Vaal townships in September 1984. Political leaders in Vaal were accused of having exploited residents' socioeconomic grievances to provoke subversion. In this respect, the prosecution concurred with national Minister of Law and Order Louis le Grange, who had announced in September 1984 that the uprising was not in fact a response to the rent increases but was driven by "individuals and other forces".

The courtroom is a stage for emotional drama. Blacks induced to testify for the state recant in the witness box. Tears roll down the face of a defendant as he relates how the pass laws compelled him as a child to lie about his father's identity. George Bizos, a renowned lawyer, weeps as his clients are led away after sentencing. The less evident drama in progress is the slow-motion political endgame being played out as agents of the white state desperately grapple with a spreading mass movement that threatens to overload their institutional mechanisms for dealing with black rebellion... Having a judge rule that the United Democratic Front was subversive was a more palatable method of suppressing the group than shooting down its supporters in the streets. Justice could be seen to be done; whether it was actually done was another matter.

— Academic Gail M. Gerhart describes the trial

In this framework, and with the aid of the common purpose doctrine, the state presented ostensibly normal, non-violent political acts by the defendants – including attendance at political or community meetings, statements at such meetings, and possession of political literature – as evidence for their complicity in the ANC's revolutionary conspiracy. By a similar logic, the state argued that the defendants could collectively be held responsible for the killing of the five black councillors during the uprising, even though the state did not claim that they had individually participated in any murderous acts.

==== Defence ====
The defendants denied all charges, but the UDF's Lekota said that they would attempt to use the trial to "assist in the process of change in this country". Leading co-counsel George Bizos later described their strategy as "a Socratic defence", similar to that adopted by activists in the 1956 Treason Trial: "we would admit to most of the facts but then you say far from committing any crime, I have done my patriotic duty and shouldn't be punished". The defence conceded that they had participated in opposition politics but argued that their participation constituted legitimate and non-violent acts of protest. The defendants also put forward that they had been politicised by their socioeconomic circumstances, not by the ANC's political ideology. At a broader level, they claimed that the UDF had been formed as a popular front not in response to a call by Oliver Tambo but to an earlier call by internal activist Allan Boesak, an account generally supported by scholars of black politics.

Similarly, in respect of the September 1984 protests, the defence argued that the UDF had a minimal role, and that most of the organisation had occurred in independent local structures. They presented hundreds of affidavits from local residents in Vaal who outlined the specific local grievances – primarily related to misconduct and maladministration by local councillors – which they said had motivated them to participate in popular protests.

=== Three acquitted: November 1986 ===
When the state rested its case, Chaskalson for the defence applied for the release of all 22 defendants on the grounds that the state's evidence was irrelevant to the charges. In late November 1986, Judge van Dijkhorst ruled that, in the case of most of the defendants, there was evidence to suggest that their aim had been "the destruction of local authority in the Vaal Triangle". However, he said that there was insufficient evidence to continue to hold three of the defendants: Lazarus More, Amos Malindi, and Simon Vilakazi were acquitted and released.

At the same time, van Dijkhorst granted bail to six of the remaining 19 defendants. They were joined by ten others in mid-1987, when van Dijkhorst granted $7,500 bail to all but the three UDF leaders, Lekota, Molefe, and Chikane. He said that his decision was based on the evident "material change" in the security situation in Transvaal, with less racial unrest, but that he remained unpersuaded that the UDF three would appear for trial if released.

=== Verdict: November 1988 ===
Arguments concluded in mid-November 1988 and Judge van Dijkhorst opened the reading of his 1,521-page verdict by withdrawing bail for eight defendants. Another early inauspicious sign for the defence was the judge's warning that "No freedom can be absolute, not even freedom of speech. The state also is entitled to be protected against the venomous tongue of rabble rousers". On 18 November 1988, van Dijkhorst concluded his verdict by acquitting eight of the defendants and convicting the eleven others.

Underlying the convictions was the judge's endorsement of the prosecution's view of the UDF. In a lengthy footnote, he accepted the state's claim "that the dominant part of the UDF leadership acted as the internal wing of the ANC". He accepted, moreover, that the UDF, though it had not openly advocated violence, had "set about to foster dissatisfaction and create a revolutionary climate amongst the Black population" in order to "prepare the ground for the final onslaught by the masses" against the state. He viewed the Vaal uprising as a mechanism of this stratagem and therefore dismissed the defence's argument that the uprising had been a spontaneous reaction to socioeconomic grievances, writing:

It is evident that the unrest which flared in the period of 1984 to 1985 in South Africa was not sporadic haphazard violence as can be associated with frustration borne from unemployment or low living standards. The unrest was preceded by a propaganda campaign of vast magnitude, which not only attacked the new constitution and the exclusion of blacks therefrom, but also encompassed the Black education system and the Black local authorities.

The three UDF leaders, whom van Dijkhorst described as the "conspiratorial core inside the UDF apple", were convicted of treason, as was Tom Manthata, a South African Council of Churches (SACC) representative and former Black Consciousness activist. Defining treason as "crime by those who, with hostile intent, engage in injury or damage to the state", and identifying the state with the government, van Dijkhorst accepted the prosecution's argument that non-violent speeches and protests could be treasonable.

We find that the dominant core of the leadership of the UDF formulated and executed a policy of mass organisation whilst fomenting a revolutionary climate in order to lead to mass action against governmental institutions. Violence was an intended, necessary and inevitable component of such action by the masses. It was intended to make South Africa ungovernable. It follows that in respect of that leadership of the UDF the state has proven the crime of treason.

— Judgement in State v Baleka and Others

The other seven convicted were found guilty of terrorism under section 54 of the Internal Security Act for having organised demonstrations in Vaal. Van Dijkhorst agreed with the prosecution's contention – consistently denied by the defendants – that the defendants had gone ahead with the demonstrations in full knowledge that they would create a climate of violence that would destabilise the government. In the judge's phrase, "A legal march was held with guilty intent."

==== Responses ====
In the immediate aftermath of the judgement, the defendants did not express contrition, with Lekota telling the press, "We don't apologize for our stand". Critics of the apartheid state condemned the verdict and worried that it provided the government with a justification to ban the UDF. Frank Chikane of the SACC said, ''What shocked me in particular in the nature of the judgment is that you are found guilty of terrorism for simply providing leadership and for understanding the political situation in this country.''

Agreeing with analysts' assessment that the application of the treason charge constituted an unprecedented broadening of the concept, Helen Suzman expressed concern about van Dijkhorst's implication that "one can commit high treason without violence", saying that the judgement "narrows the margin in this country between lawful dissent and what is considered treason". In a similar vein, Desmond Tutu wrote an op-ed in the New York Times arguing that, "If these four men have committed treason, then I have committed treason and should face charges as well". Tutu mounted a particular defence of Tom Manthatha, whom he said he had sent to Vaal in his capacity as general secretary of the SACC.

=== Sentencing: December 1988 ===
After the defence presented arguments on mitigating circumstances, Judge van Djikhorst handed down sentences on 8 December. In a 45-minute address to the court, he dismissed the argument that punitive sentencing would delay racial reconciliation in South Africa, saying:

I accept in order to work out through a process of negotiation a peaceful co-existence, a credible leadership is needed. I accept the UDF is seen by many to have an important role in the process. I fully appreciate that the demise of the UDF may leave a void which may take a number of years to fill. It may well be this will slow down the process of reform, as was alleged. For this consequence, the UDF has itself to blame.

However, he said that he had nonetheless decided he "would rather err on the side of leniency", taking into account that most of the accused had already been detained for long periods and the need to heal the wounds of the Vaal uprising. He also said that he had taken into account what he described as the defendants' "leadership potential". Particularly singling out Molefe and Manthata, he said that those convicted "can in the future play a constructive role on the political scene, provided that they forswear the violent option and act within the law".

The defendants therefore did not receive the maximum penalty, the death sentence. Those convicted of treason were sentenced to lengthy prison sentences, with Molefe earning the longest sentence of 12 years. Gcina Malindi was also given a prison sentence for terrorism, with Djikhorst citing his criminal record (a public violence conviction). The six other accused were convicted of terrorism but received five-year suspended sentences with stringent conditions on their political activity, similar to those imposed on the recipients of banning orders. The following is a list of sentences handed down.

- Mosiuoa Lekota (treason, 12 years)
- Popo Molefe (treason, ten years)
- Moss Chikane (treason, ten years)
- Tom Manthata (treason, six years)
- Gcina Malindi (terrorism, five years)
- David Mphuthi (terrorism, suspended)
- Naphtali Nkopane (terrorism, suspended)
- Tebello Ephraim Ramakgula (terrorism, suspended)
- Sekwati Mokoena (terrorism, suspended)
- Serame Hlanyane (terrorism, suspended)
- Hlabeng Matlole (terrorism, suspended)

The sentencing hearing was attended by a large number of UDF supporters, who shouted "Viva UDF" and sang Nkosi Sikelel' i'Afrika as the men were led to the cells. Responding to the sentencing, the United States Embassy in Pretoria, calling the accused "men of good will, working peacefully for a non-racial, democratic South Africa", said, "Even though the sentences are not as harsh as many people feared they would be, the judgment in this case is regrettable because of its grave implications for those committed to pursuing political change through peaceful means". The defence immediately filed an application for leave to appeal. While the appeal was prepared and heard, the 11 convicts were held on Robben Island.

We view the present trial as an interim affair. Somewhere in the future lies a date when black and white South Africans will take a second look at these moments of our history. They will evaluate afresh the events now in contention and our role in them. And since the privilege will belong to them, they will pass final judgement. We are convinced that theirs will be contrary to the present one. They will vindicate us.

— Joint statement of the UDF three, December 1985

== Appeal: 1988–1989 ==
=== Arguments ===
During the appeal, the defence argued that the prosecution had relied on evidence from unreliable state's witnesses and had not clearly defined its central charge of a "revolutionary climate". It also argued that Judge van Dijkorst had been impatient with defence counsel during proceedings and had frequently intervened in a manner which was prejudicial to the accused, which created the impression of partiality on his part, and which made it difficult for defence counsel to cross-examine state's witnesses.

However, the centre of the appeal was the defence's objection to the removal of one of two assessors, Willem Joubert, in early 1987. Van Dijkhorst had fired Joubert after discovering that he was a signatory to the UDF's Million Signatures campaign. This decision had sparked acrimonious arguments between the judge and Joubert and the judge and the defence, leading in March 1987 to an unsuccessful application by the defence for van Dijkhorst's recusal. Van Dijkhorst had repeatedly suppressed an affidavit from Joubert – purporting to describe prejudicial conversations between himself and van Dijkhorst – both during the trial and while hearing the application for leave to appeal. Among other things, Joubert claimed that, early in the trial, the judge had bet him a bottle of whiskey that the defendants would not dare take the stand, implying that he had prejudged the defendants' guilt.

=== Verdict ===
In 1989, the Supreme Court Appellate Division in Bloemfontein heard arguments on a limited aspect of this saga, the procedural question of the lawfulness of Joubert's removal; the defence argued that it had been irregular and that the trial court had therefore not been properly constituted. By the time the decision was handed down, South African state president P. W. Botha had been replaced by F. W. de Klerk, who was comparatively willing to negotiate the end of apartheid and whose government had already freed several political prisoners. On 15 December 1989, the 11 Delmas convicts joined those freed when the appellate division overturned their convictions and sentences. Chief Justice Michael Corbett ruled in S v Malindi and Others that van Dijkhorst had fundamentally misapplied the Criminal Procedure Act in releasing Joubert as an assessor.

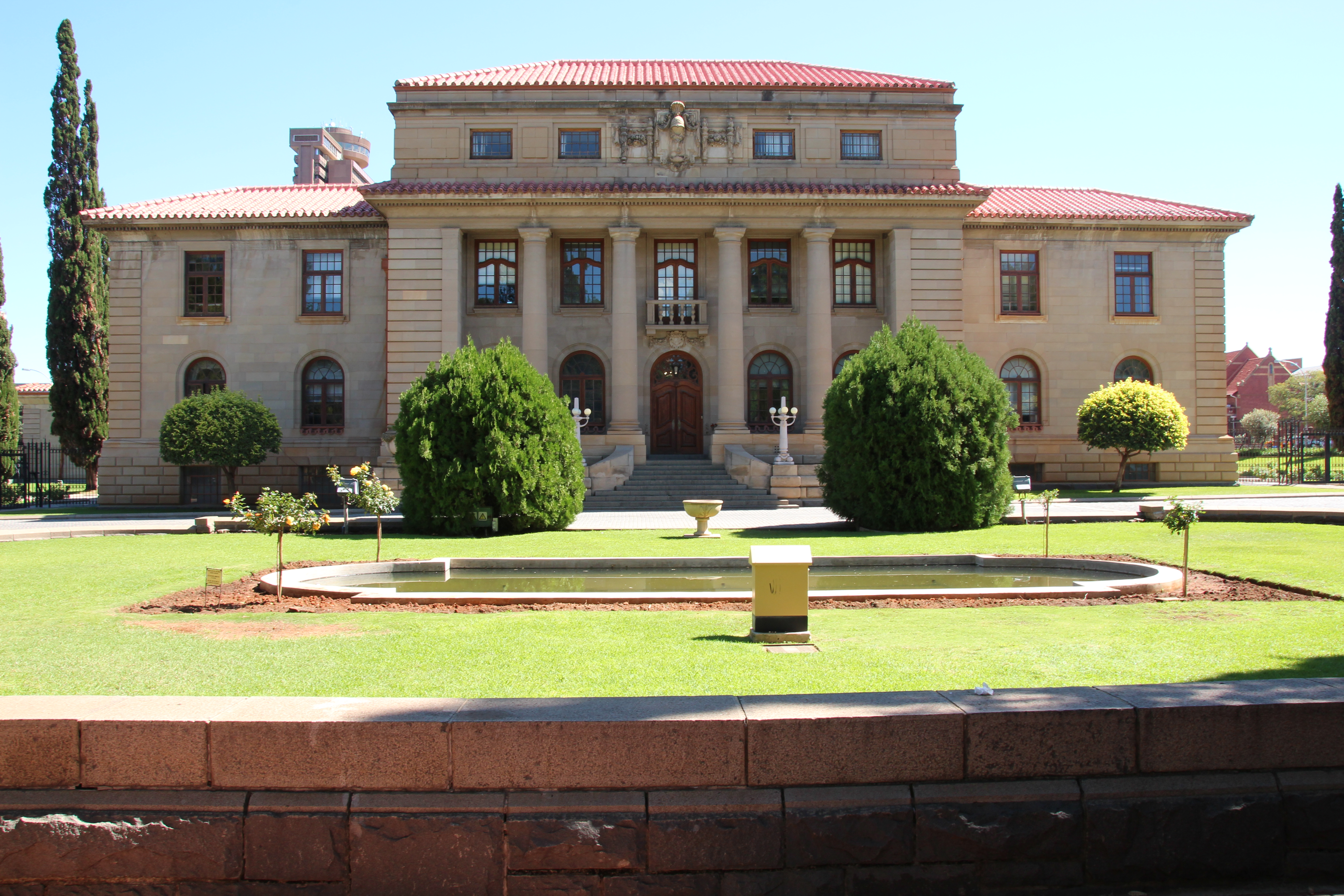
The appeal was upheld in the Supreme Court of Appeal in Bloemfontein

Dennis Davis of the University of Cape Town applauded the appellate judgement insofar as it freed the defendants to participate in the political transition and partly restored the legitimacy of the legal system. Indeed, he said that the initial trial had been so clearly "fraught with legal controversy" that the state's aim of delegitimating the opposition had already been defeated, notwithstanding the guilty verdict. However, while criticising van Dijkhorst's decision-making, he also expressed sympathy for the judge, noting that van Dijkhorst had adjudicated the case in a different political context to that which now faced the appellate division:

The real loser in trials designed by the State to criminalize the political programmes of its opponents can only be the legal system, particularly where there is a fundamental lack of political consensus within the society. In these circumstances judges are asked to perform the role of political commissars rather than lawyers adjudicating on the competing claims of a set of facts or interpreting a legal rule. When judges are asked to assess the content of political programmes they function outside their traditional field of competence... Where there is a lack of political consensus the real possibility exists that the judge will assess the case within the framework of the political discourse of the political group holding power [in van Dijkhorst's case, P. W. Botha's wing of the National Party].

Other analyses similarly stressed that Judge van Dikhorst shared the government's "political worldview, its fears, prejudices, sense of morality and political values".

== Monument ==
In March 2012, the provincial government of Mpumalanga (a new province established in the Eastern Transvaal after the end of apartheid) unveiled a monument to the Delmas triallists outside the Delmas Magistrate's Court.
