= Moss Chikane =

South African politician

Moses Mabokela "Moss" Chikane (1949 – 17 October 2018) was a South African politician and anti-apartheid activist who represented the African National Congress (ANC) in the National Assembly. He was convicted in the Delmas Treason Trial.
