= Langa massacre =

1985 massacre of civilians by South African police

On 21 March 1985, on the 25th anniversary of the Sharpeville massacre, members of the South African Police opened fire on a crowd of people gathered on Maduna Road between Uitenhage and Langa township in the Eastern Cape, South Africa. The crowd had been attending a funeral of one of the six who had been slain by the apartheid police on 17 March 1985. They had gathered at Maduna Square and were heading towards the house where the funeral was held when the police blocked the road with two armoured vehicles and ordered the crowd to disperse. When the crowd failed to comply immediately, police opened fire on the crowd, killing 35 people and leaving 27 wounded. The incident became known as the Uitenhage/Langa massacre.

== Background ==
In March 1985, tensions between the African population in Uitenhage's townships and the apartheid government reached boiling point. Between 8 and 10 March, police reported 23 incidents of arson and 18 of stone-throwing, causing damage estimated at R220 000. Minister of Law and Order Louis le Grange, had visited Uitenhage with the commissioner of police, General Johan Coetzee, on 19 February. They had been told that ‘soft’ weaponry was no longer effective for riot control purposes. On 14 March, Uitenhage's most senior police officers, the Order Group, decided to take stronger action to regain control. As from 15 March, police patrols were no longer issued with teargas, rubber bullets and birdshot; instead they were given heavy ammunition.

The increased police presence and use of heavy ammunition in the townships of Uitenhage resulted in the killing of six black youth. The funeral of four of the six was to be held on Sunday 17 March 1985 and a stay away was called for Monday 18 March as part of ‘Black Weekend’. The name 'Black Weekend' comes from the fact that the KwaNobuhle township community had chosen that weekend to bury four people killed by the apartheid police earlier in March 1985. Police said that three petrol bombs were thrown at a police vehicle in Langa during this weekend. Police also shot and killed a young man on 17 March 1985. The houses of two police officers in Langa were destroyed by fire.

Captain Goosen from the Uitenhage branch applied for a court order which banned all funerals on weekends, Mondays and public holidays from Chief Magistrate MH Steyn. The order was granted on the grounds that limiting funerals would help curb political actions against the apartheid government. The community of Langa then rescheduled the funerals for Thursday, 21 March 1985. Goosen realised that the 21 March marked the 25 anniversary of the 1960 Sharpeville massacre, where the apartheid police killed 69 black Africans. He then applied for another order to have the funeral postponed yet again, this time approaching Uitenhage Magistrate M. J. Groenwald, who accordingly ruled that funerals could only be held on a Sunday. The first orders which banned funeral on weekends, Mondays and public holidays and the second which banned funerals except on Sundays were both in effect at the same time, leading to a sense of confusion and resentment in the township of Uitenhage.

== Massacre ==
On 21 March 1985, Lieutenant John Fouche and his team patrolled the township of Langa until 8am and found it quiet, they then headed to KwaNobuhle township. Warrant Officer F.W Pentz and his team patrolled KwaNobuhle township and did not find any signs of protest or marching. However, a warrant officer Lekubo noticed a crowd gathering at Maduna Square. He relayed the message to the police headquarters in Uitenhage. Pentz and his team then drove through the crowd and parked the police vehicle on the side of the road. Pentz, who had been in KwaNobuhle township, headed to the police headquarters in Uitenhage, returned with a white police officer who had not been part of original patrol squad that morning. He then drove down the 23rd Street and came across the crowd had seen. Pentz sent a message to Lieutenant Fouche via radio that his patrol needed assistance before accelerating along Maduna Road to small hill between the crowd and the white residential area. A team led by Fouche joined Pentz's team and the two vehicles formed a cordon facing the crowd in a "V" position.

Police teams led by Fouche and Pentz tried to disperse the crowd. However, the crowd continued to march peacefully. Realising that the crowd was not following their (police) orders, the police fired 41 rounds of SSG shotgun ammunition, three round of R1 ammunition and an unrecorded number of rounds of 9mm bullets from their automatic rifles. The shooting left 35 people dead and 27 wounded.

On Saturday, 13 April 1985, a mass burial was held to mourn the deaths of 29 people who had died after being shot by police in Langa township, Uitenhage on 21 March was held at KwaNobuhle Stadium. The 29 deceased people were buried in a mass grave in KwaNobuhle Cemetery. The families of the other six people who died from the massacre opted for private burials.

== Aftermath ==
The Kannemeyer Commission was appointed the day after the shooting with Judge Donald Kannemeyer as its chairperson and sole member. The Kannemeyer Commission reported that 20 people were shot dead and at least 27 were wounded, and that the majority had been shot in the back. He found that, in the circumstances, the police could not be blamed for issuing orders to open fire. Although, Kannemeyer did not find the police guilty, he added that the police were armed with lethal weapons rather than standard riot control gear because of a deliberate policy adopted by senior officers, and the police should thus have foreseen that an order to open fire would result in fatalities. The report went on to say that police evidence of the weapons carried by the crowd was exaggerated. Charges of public violence laid against 31 people following the Langa massacre of March 1985 were dropped a year later. Of the 31 charged, 21 had been injured by police gunfire.

In 1986, an inquest at the New Brighton courts in Port Elizabeth found that the deaths were not the result of any act or negligence constituting a crime on the part of anyone. The inquest findings were based on the evidence heard by Kannemeyer and it was considered unnecessary to call any of the witnesses to give their evidence to the inquest. As a result of this decision, the families of the deceased withdrew from the inquest proceedings. In 1987, Minister of Law and Order paid out R2,3-million to 51 people injured or widowed in the Uitenhage massacre. The government had admitted that the police had acted wrongfully and negligently and that this was the cause of the incident.

== Legacy ==
A year after the 1985 Langa massacre, a memorial tombstone dedicated to those who died was unveiled in the KwaNobuhle Cemetery. The tombstone was vandalised in June 1987 and re-erected in March 1994.

The Langa Massacre foundation, led by individuals directly affected by the massacre, advocates for the survivors and the families of the victims.

In March 2015, approaching the 30th anniversary of the Langa massacre, the Uitenhage Massacre Foundation announced plans for a new R89-million memorial building for the Langa Massacre victims. This memorial will include an amphitheater, a conference room, and a heroes’ wall.

== References in music ==
The Australian rock band Icehouse included a song inspired by the Langa massacre written by Iva Davies called "The Flame" on their 1986 album Measure for Measure. Davies makes reference at the opening of a live performance of the song in 1986 in New York City.

== See also ==
- List of massacres in South Africa
- Marikana massacre
- Sharpeville massacre
- Bisho massacre
- Natives Land Act, 1913
