= Radio Freedom =

Radio propaganda arm of the African National Congress

Pretoria (initial broadcasts), various exile locations; South Africa (clandestine)
- Broadcast area: Sub-Saharan Africa
- Branding: Radio Freedom

Programming
- Language: English, African languages
- Format: Political, anti-apartheid, liberation movement
- Affiliations: African National Congress, Umkhonto we Sizwe

History
- First air date: June 1963 (formal), mid-1950s (initial)
- Last air date: 1991

Radio Freedom also called Radio Zambia was a South African radio arm of the African National Congress (ANC) and its fighting wing Umkhonto we Sizwe (MK) (Spear of the Nation) during the anti-Apartheid struggle from the 1970s through the 1990s. It was the oldest liberation radio station in Africa. Listening to Radio Freedom in Apartheid-era South Africa was a crime carrying a penalty of up to eight years in prison.

Though its first formal broadcast was aired in June 1963 the first broadcasts by what was then called Freedom Radio took place in the mid-1950s. The illegally-constructed transmitters were very low-powered devices, made by amateurs and operated by white activists. The first broadcasts came from various sites in Natal. Then a transmitter came on the air from Pretoria by which time the South African Police, assisted by Post Office engineers, had developed a radio direction finding set-up which successfully traced the transmitter to an address in the Muckleneuk suburb of Pretoria. The police raided the address while a broadcast was taking place and arrested five people. They also took possession of the radio transmitter plus other apparatus. The five accused came to court where they were found guilty of operating an illegal transmitter. They appealed against the judgement on a technicality and were tried again by a higher court in Pretoria on 29 July 1957. The two judges rejected their appeal and the five were duly sentenced to a fine or three months imprisonment. There was then a considerable hiatus until the next broadcast occurred from a transmitter outside South Africa in 1963. The activist and ANC member Walter Sisulu announced the new station, saying "I come to you from somewhere in South Africa... Never has the country, and our people, needed leadership as they do now, in this hour of crisis. Our house is on fire.” By the mid-1970s, having been exiled, Radio Freedom was broadcasting on radio stations in five countries (Tanzania, Zambia, Angola, Ethiopia, and Madagascar).

In 1983, South African soldiers targeted and destroyed Radio Freedom's Madagascar facility, halting its operation for a short time.

Station identifications featured machine-gun fire, followed by spoken words such as "This is Radio Freedom, the voice of the African National Congress and its military wing uMkhonto we Sizwe", or a variation of that. These identifications became familiar to international audiences after an excerpt from one was included in a hit song "3 a.m. Eternal", first released in 1989, by The KLF.

Like other guerrilla stations, Radio Freedom shared news, interviews, poetry and commentary from the movement that ran counter to the highly censored media reports from within South Africa. Regular reports on bombings and acts of sabotage by the MK gave the impression of a nearly continuous assault and encouraged listeners to join the movement.

For some listeners, Radio Freedom's most valued contribution was the music, as it was the only place where one could hear exiled South African musicians like Dollar Brand (Abdullah Ibrahim), Dudu Pukwana, Miriam Makeba, or any music critical of apartheid. Much like tuning into Radio Freedom could come with a prison sentence, so too did owning a record of these artists; possessing a Miriam Makeba record, for instance, could lead to five years in prison.

In 1991, as apartheid came to an end, so too did Radio Freedom. The ANC, which had already shifted priorities from seizing power to gaining a seat at the table, convinced the new government to release political prisoners and welcome exiles back to South Africa. With broadcasters lining up to return home, the station slipped off the air without fanfare.

Winnie Mandela and several people featured in Amandla!: A Revolution in Four-Part Harmony credit Radio Freedom as a significant comforting, rallying, and organising factor in the fight against Apartheid.
