= Muzi Sikhakhane =

South African lawyer (born 1967)

Adv. Muzi Sikhakhane SC
- Born: Muzi Frederick Sikhakhane; 5 October 1967 (age 58); Bulwer, KwaZulu-Natal, South Africa
- Education: Indumiso Teacher's Training College; Witwatersrand University
- Occupation: Advocate
- Spouse: Adv. Ndlovukazi Sikhakhane
- Children: Mpilo Sikhakhane; Ntandokazi Sikhakhane; Mathula Sikhakhane

Muzi Frederick Sikhakhane (born 5 October 1967) is South African senior counsel and a practising advocate. He is the founding chairperson of the Pan African Bar Association of South Africa (Pabasa), a bar association founded in October 2018. He has been involved in several high-profile cases, including chairing the Sikhakhane Commission that investigated the conduct of former South African Revenue Service (SARS) group executive Johann van Loggerenberg. He also represented former president Jacob Zuma at the Pietermaritzburg High Court and Zondo Commission.

Sikhakhane is considered a prominent figure in South Africa's legal and political spheres and has criticised what he views as an untransformed country economically since the post-apartheid breakthrough of 1994, with blacks continuing to be poor.

== Early life and education ==
Sikhakhane was born in the KwaZulu Natal rural area of Bulwer on 5 October 1967. He matriculated at Pholela High, a boarding school in Bulwer. In 1984, he enrolled for teaching at Indumiso Teacher's Training College (now Durban University of Technology). When he finished college, he could not find employment because the government knew his political views as a member of the Azanian Student Organisation (AZASO). All members of AZASO had been detained by the Natal apartheid government, including Sikhakhane, on numerous times for pro-democracy activism and there were orders not to employ them after graduations. He was employed in a secondary school in Bulwer by the KwaZulu bantustan government and taught English, Zulu and history from February to October 1987. Political violence between supporters of the Inkatha Freedom Party (IFP) and African National Congress (ANC) led to Sikhakhane fleeing the area. This is after he was attacked by group that purported to be members of IFP on 12 November 1987 and on 14 November he left to Johannesburg. He lived in Soweto and taught at St Mathew’s High School, a Catholic school. In 1990, the Security Branch arrested Sikhakhane and Aubrey Matshiqi for involvement with the United Democratic Front (UDF) and uMkhonto we Sizwe, a military wing of the ANC fighting against apartheid. In 1994, he enrolled at Wits University where he studied a Bachelor of Arts degree and then a Bachelor of Laws. In the same year, he joined the South African Student Congress (SASCO) and was elected as the president of the Student Representative Council (SRC), serving from 1994 to 1995.

== Legal career ==
When he graduated from Wits, he became a lawyer and was admitted in 2001 to the Johannesburg's Bar council. He took silk as Senior Counsel in 2015, reflecting his expertise in complex litigation.

In 2009, Sikhakhane attracted media attention when he withrew as junior counsel in the Constitutional Court (Concourt) litigation concerning Judge President John Hlophe, citing “seriously patronising” and “degrading” conduct by senior counsel and strategic disagreements. Judge Hlophe had been reported to the Judicial Service Commission (JSC) by judges of the Concourt over allegations that Hlophe had approached two judges, namely Justice Nkabinde and Justice Jafta of the Concourt, and attempted to improperly influence them in a pending corruption case involving Jacob Zuma and the Thint company. Sikhakhane represented the Concourt judges as a junior to legal heavyweight Advocate Gilbert Marcus. His withdrawal was seen as proof by Hlophe's legal team that the matter against Hlophe was politically motivated.

In September 2014, Sikhakhane was appointed to chair an enquiry that investigated the conduct of Johann van Loggerenberg, a former investigator for the South African Revenue Service (SARS).

On 20 May 2019, Sikhakhane led Zuma’s defence team at the Pietermaritzburg High Court, seeking a permanent stay of prosecution in the 1999 arms deal corruption case. He also represented Zuma before the Zondo Commission when Zuma was accused of state capture involving the Gupta family, arguing that the accusations are part of a wider plot to tarnish Zuma's name in the battle for power in the ruling African National Congress (ANC), where Zuma served as president under dark clouds of corruption allegations, which were viewed as smear campaigns.

In July 2025, Sikhakhane was again reported to be part high-profile legal team to represent Zuma in his ongoing corruption cases in KZN, a team described as a “dream team”, which included senior advocates Mike Hellens, Dawie Joubert, and Thabani Masuku, alongside junior counsel Mpilo Sikhakhane, Muzi's son.

Ahead of the 2024 South African general election, Sikhakhane was part of the high-powered legal team for the uMkhonto weSizwe Party (MKP) formed by Zuma in a trademark case against the ANC over the use of the MK logo and name as it was a name of the ANC 's military wing, uMkhonto weSizwe (MK). He argued that the battle was about electoral support and not trademark, emphasizing that trademark law deals with trade in goods and services.

In 2025, he represented Eastern Cape High Court judge president Selby Mbenenge when Mbenenge appeared before an enquiry probing a sexual harassment levelled against Mbenenge by a court secretary, Andiswa Mengo.

In May 2025, Sikhakhane was awarded an honorary Doctor of Laws (LLD) by the University of Zululand in recognition of his contributions to the legal profession and advocacy for human rights and justice.

== Founding of Pabasa (Pan-African Bar Association of South Africa) ==
In October 2018, Muzi Sikhakhane was amongst a group of prominent advocates who the Pan African Bar Association of South Africa (Pabasa), a new advocates' association formed in response to the Legal Practice Act and the transformation needs of South Africa’s white-dominated legal profession. Alongside fellow advocates Nasreen Rajab-Budlender and Tembeka Ngcukaitobi, Sikhakhane sought to establish an organization that would be "unapologetically" black and women-oriented, aiming to reflect the demographics of South Africa and offer a more inclusive and progressive environment for advocates, especially black and women practitioners. Pabasa was envisioned as an alternative to the existing Bars in South Africa, which Sikhakhane and his colleagues felt were insufficiently transformative and were led by white males. Pabasa's goal, said Sikhakhane, is to move away from trying to reform historically exclusive apartheid institutions and instead create a new space that aligned with anti-colonial values and promoted equity. Mandisa Maya delivered a keynote address at the launch of Pabasa. Sikhakhane became the inaugural chairperson. Among the notable founding members of Pabasa were prominent figures like Dali Mpofu, Gcina Malindi, and Dumisa Ntsebeza.
