= Black Local Authorities Act, 1982 =

Parliament of South Africa
- Long title: Act to provide for the establishment of local committees, village councils and town councils for Black persons in certain areas; for the appointment of a Director of Local Government; and for incidental matters.
- Citation: Act No. 102 of 1982
- Enacted by: Parliament of South Africa
- Assented to: 23 June 1982
- Commenced: 1 August 1983
- Repealed: 2 February 1994
- Administered by: Minister of Co-operation and Development

Repealed by
- Local Government Transition Act, 1993
- Status: Repealed

The Black Local Authorities Act of 1982 provided for the establishment of a series of local government structures similar to those operating in the South African Apartheid "White areas". For the first time under Apartheid, African black residents of urban locations gained something like autonomy. Although the African black race did not have access to Parliament, this Act gave the racial group limited local township power.

Elected by local residents, councillors were responsible for township administration on budgets raised by local rents and levies.

== Repeal ==
The Act was repealed on 2 February 1994 by the Local Government Transition Act, 1993.

== See also ==
- Category:Apartheid laws in South Africa
- Apartheid in South Africa
