= Vaal Triangle =

Urban area near Johannesburg, South Africa

Coordinates: 26°44′00″S 27°52′00″E

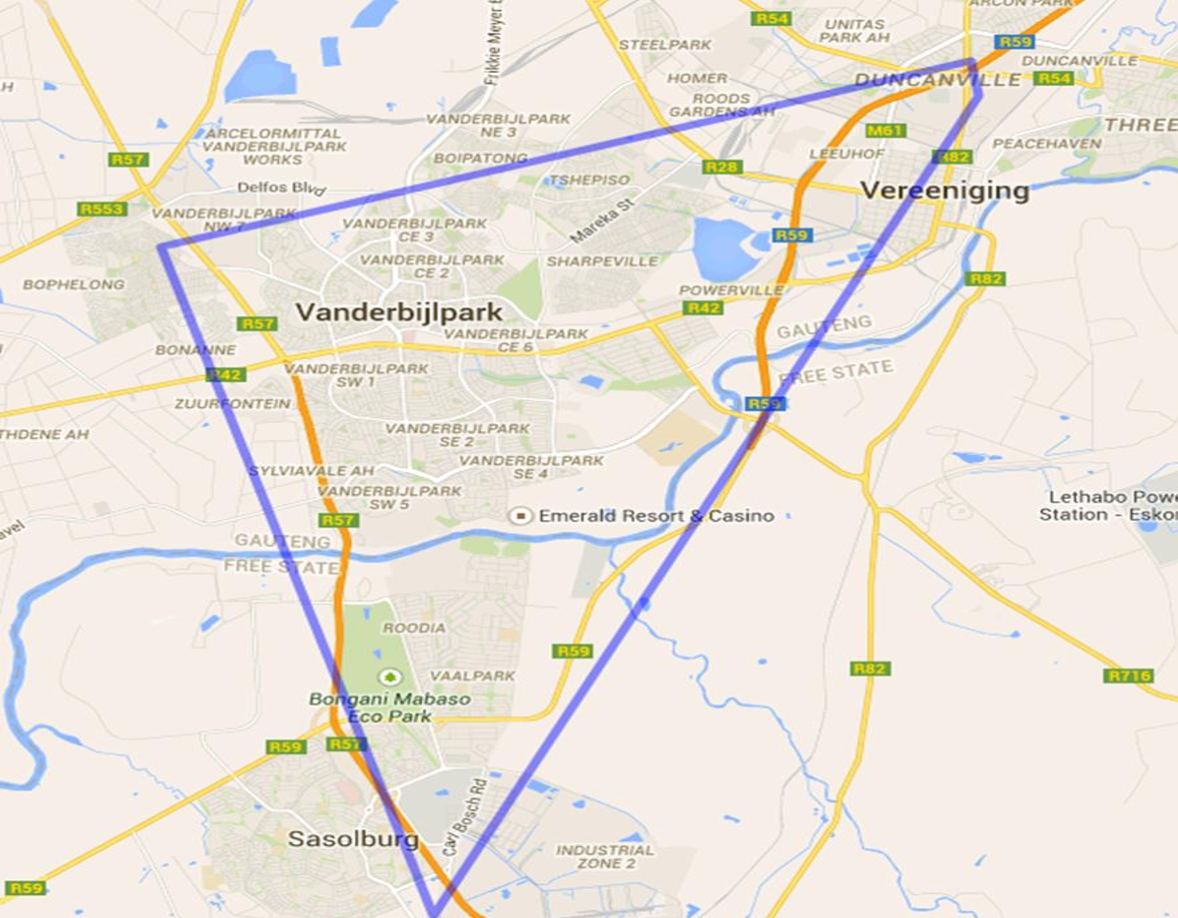
Map of the Vaal Triangle region showing the geographic demarcation

The Vaal Triangle is a triangular area formed by Vereeniging, Vanderbijlpark and Sasolburg about 60 km south of Johannesburg, South Africa. The area forms a substantial urban complex. Meyerton, just north of Vereeniging, is also sometimes included in the complex, and residents of Sharpeville, Boipatong, Bophelong, the greater Sebokeng area (including Evaton), Three Rivers, Heidelberg and Deneysville also generally tend to consider themselves to live in the Vaal Triangle. The area straddles the Vaal River and is a major industrial region, which is home to former Iron and Steel Corporation Iscor, now ArcelorMittal South Africa, and Sasol, respectively the steel and petrochemical processing facilities.

== Pollution ==
Due to the heavy industries in and around the Vaal Triangle it has become infamous for its air pollution and respiratory disease. According to an analysis by OpenAQ, the area regularly registers the highest concentration of PM2.5 particulate pollution worldwide. In 2013, research by the Council for Scientific and Industrial Research (CSIR) revealed that areas in the Vaal Triangle have persistently higher concentrations of air pollutants such as nitrogen dioxide, than in the rest of South Africa. For this reason, local Afrikaans speaking people often refer to the region as the Vuil Driehoek (meaning Dirty Triangle) as a pun on Vaal Driehoek (the Afrikaans translation for Vaal Triangle).

== Tourism and recreation ==
Nearby is the Vaal Dam, from which the massive PWV megalopolis (Pretoria, Witwatersrand and Vereeniging) draws its water. The PWV forms the urban heart of Gauteng province. The Witwatersrand is the name given to the area that comprises the Greater Johannesburg metropole and the gold-bearing reef along which gold was discovered in 1886.

The Vaal Dam is well-patronised by people from Johannesburg over the weekends and during holidays, as it provides extensive water recreation facilities some 70 km south of the city.
