= M68 (Johannesburg) =

Metropolitan route in the City of Johannesburg, South Africa

Metropolitan route M68

Route information
- Maintained by Johannesburg Roads Agency and Gauteng Department of Roads and Transport
- Length: 26.4 km (16.4 mi)

Major junctions
- West end: N12 / R554 near Lenasia
- M72 at Moroka M77 at Moroka; M10 at Pimville M83 at Diepkloof; N12 at Diepkloof; R553 at Southgate M38 at Southgate; M1 / R82 at Southgate; M7 at Glenanda M95 at Glenvista
- East end: M7 at Mulbarton

Location
- Country: South Africa

Highway system
- Numbered routes of South Africa
← M67	→ M69

The M68 is a short metropolitan route in the City of Johannesburg, South Africa. It connects the south-western part of Soweto (Protea South) with Mulbarton via Diepkloof, Southgate and Glenvista.

== Route ==
The M68 begins at an interchange with the N12 Moroka Bypass and the R554 road just north of Lenasia. It begins by going northwards as Abu Baker Asvat Drive up to the next junction in Protea South (south of Protea Glen), where it becomes Chris Hani Road eastwards.

It goes east-north-east through Soweto for 10 kilometres as Chris Hani Road, meeting the M72, M77 and M10 roads, to reach a junction with the M83 road and pass by the Chris Hani Baragwanath Hospital. It proceeds eastwards as Old Potchefstroom Road, through the southern part of Diepkloof, to exit Soweto and fly over the N1 highway adjacent to the N1's interchange with the N12 highway (Johannesburg Southern Bypass). Here, there is a ramp providing access to the N12 Southern Bypass.

The M68 enters the Johannesburg South Area, first entering the Southgate suburb and meeting the R553 road (Golden Highway), then meeting the M38 road (Rifle Range Road) at the next junction and passing by the Southgate Shopping Centre (north of Meredale). Immediately after the Southgate Shopping Centre, the M68 crosses the R82/M1 highway (De Villiers Graaff Motorway) as Columbine Avenue and continues eastwards to pass through the suburbs of Mondeor, Winchester Hills and Suideroord.

5 kilometres east of the M1/R82 interchange, the M68 meets the M7 road (Kliprivier Drive) and leaves Suideroord to enter the Glenada suburb. Soon after, the M68 turns southwards and enters the Glenvista suburb, where it meets the M95 road (Bellairs Drive). It continues southwards to enter the suburb of Mulbarton, where it ends at another junction with the M7 road (Kliprivier Drive).
