= M7 (Johannesburg) =

Metropolitan route in Johannesburg, South Africa

Metropolitan route M7

Route information
- Maintained by Johannesburg Roads Agency and Gauteng Department of Roads and Transport
- Length: 37.2 km (23.1 mi)

Major junctions
- South end: Hill Road, Zonkizizwe
- M53 Kaunda Street, Zonkizizwe; M61 Vereeniging Road, Alrode South; M80 J.G. Strydom Rd Albertsdal; R59 Sybrand van Niekerk Freeway, Brakendowns; R554 Swartkoppies Road, Mulbarton M68 True North Road, Mulbarton M95 Bellairs Drive, Glenvista M68 Columbine Avenue, Suideroord; N12 Southern Bypass, Suideroord M38 South Rand Road, Gillview M34 Turf Club Street, Turffontein; M27 Booysens Road, Booysens; M70 Ophir Booysens Rd, Booysens; R41 Main Reef Road, Fordsburg; R24 Albertina Sisulu Road, Mayfair; M10 Smit Street, Pageview; M18 Enoch Sontonga Avenue, Vrededorp
- North end: M17 / M71 Barry Hertzog Avenue, Cottesloe

Location
- Country: South Africa

Highway system
- Numbered routes of South Africa
← M6	→ M8

M7 is a metropolitan route in the Greater Johannesburg metropolitan area. The road connects Thokoza and the southern suburbs of Alberton with suburbs to the west of the Johannesburg CBD.

== Route ==
The M7 begins at a t-junction with Hill Road east of Zonkizizwe. It goes westwards as Dihlabakela Road, meeting the southern terminus of the M53 route, to pass through the southern part of Katlehong and Thokoza. It flies over a railway and over the M61 route (Vereeniging Road) to enter the Alrode South suburb of Alberton, where it reaches a T-junction with Kliprivier Drive. It then heads west-north-west as Kliprivier Drive to intersect with the R59 highway (Sybrand van Niekerk Freeway), where it enters the Brakendowns suburb of Alberton. The M7 turns to the north-west and leaves Alberton to enter Johannesburg South, where it reaches a junction with the R554 Swartkoppies Road.

From the R554 junction, the M7 continues north-west and passes through Mulbarton, where it meets the M68 route. Continuing north, it meets the western terminus of the M95 route and passes in-between the Klipriviersberg Nature Reserve to its west and Glenvista to its east. Continuing north, the M7 separates Glenanda to its east from Suideroord to its west, where it meets the M68 route (Columbine Avenue) again. Immediately after, the M7 forms an interchange with the N12 highway (Johannesburg Southern Bypass) and enters the Gillview suburb, where it meets the M38 route (Rifle Range Road).

The M7 continues north, passing between the suburbs of Robertsham and Turffontein. It enters Booysens, where it reaches a T-junction with the M27 Booysens Road. The M7 joins the M27 and they are briefly co-signed for 400 m up to the Long Street junction, where the M7 becomes Long Street northwards. After 300 m, it meets the eastern terminus of the M70 route (Soweto Highway) and it turns left onto Ophir-Booysens Road, then right onto Ophir Road, then left into Treu Road, continuing north out of Booysens.

It briefly follows the M1 North before crossing underneath it adjacent to the Crown Interchange and winding northwards to an intersection with the R41 route (Main Reef Road) in the suburb of Crown (just west of Selby). It now enters the western suburbs of Johannesburg, entering Mayfair as Park Drive and intersecting with the R24 (Albertina Sisulu Road).

It enters Fordsburg and after 180 m, it turns right onto 6th Avenue and then left onto Mint Road where it T-junctions with Subway and Carr Street after 350 m. It turns left onto Subway Street, heading north and crossing under railway lines before reaching a T-junction with the M10 Smit Street. Turning right onto Smit Street, it is briefly co-signed with the M10 before turning left onto Solomon Street and entering Vrededorp, where it meets the M18 Enoch Sontonga Avenue and becomes Annet Road, passing the University of Johannesburg's Bunting Road Campus before ending at an intersection with the M71 Barry Hertzog Avenue and M17 Empire Road.
