= Bassonia =

- Bassonia's location in Gauteng
- Coordinates: 26°16′40″S 28°03′50″E
- Country: South Africa
- Province: Gauteng
- City: Johannesburg

Area
  - Total: 2.6 km^{2} (1.0 sq mi)

Population
  - Estimate (2011): 4,633
  - Density: 1,782/km^{2} (4,620/sq mi)

Race
  - White: 54.1%
  - Asian: 15.4%
  - Cape Coloured: 3.4%
  - Black: 24.5%
  - Other: 2.6%

Languages
  - English: 66.1%
  - Afrikaans: 11.3%
  - Zulu: 5.1%
  - Sotho: 4.1%
  - Other: 13.4%
- Postal code (streets): 2190
- Postal code (mailboxes): 2061

Bassonia is a southern suburb of Johannesburg, South Africa.

== Location ==
The suburb covers around 2.3 km^{2} on what was once the Klipriviersberg farm. It is at its widest 3 km north to south and 1.5 km west to east, laid out like an upside-down triangle. Bassonia borders equally hilly Glenvista to the west, Gleneagles to the South, the N12 road and Eastcliff (where The Glen shopping center lies) to the north, Oakdene to the northeast, and Bassonia Rock in the Meyersdal Nature Estate to the east.

== Demographics ==
Bassonia, Glenvista, and Mulbarton (south of Glenvista) are three of the most affluent suburbs of Johannesburg South. In stark contrast to Johannesburg's Region F downtown (88.6% black according to the 2011 census) and the older southern suburbs Turffontein [82.4%], Kenilworth [78.5%] and Rosettenville [77.2%]) which have become predominantly black, Johannesburg's far southern suburbs south of N12 and east of Kliprivier Drive are still largely white, according to the following numbers from the 2011 census (Bassonia [54.1%], Bassonia Rock [42.2%], Glenvista [60.3%] and Mulbarton [52.1%]. Oakdene just north of Bassonia was 52% white that year, compared to Townsview just north at 51.7% black. In far southern Liefde en Vrede, however, the population is 69.5% black. The southeastern suburbs are also quite young, with more than a third of the population under 25 years old.
