= M70 (Johannesburg) =

Metropolitan route in the City of Johannesburg, South Africa

Metropolitan route M70

Route information
- Maintained by Johannesburg Roads Agency and Gauteng Department of Roads and Transport
- Length: 16.9 km (10.5 mi)

Major junctions
- East end: M7 in Booysens
- M5 in Nasrec; N1 near Diepkloof M83 in Diepkloof; M10 in Orlando

- West end: M77 near Dobsonville

Location
- Country: South Africa

Highway system
- Numbered routes of South Africa
← M69	→ M71

The M70 road is a short metropolitan route in the City of Johannesburg, South Africa. It connects Booysens (south of Johannesburg CBD) with Dobsonville via Diepkloof, Orlando and Meadowlands. For much of its route, it is known as the Soweto Highway.

== Route ==
The M70 begins at a junction with the M7 route (Earp Road; Long Street) in the Booysens suburb of Johannesburg (south of Johannesburg CBD; adjacent to Ophirton), just west of the M7's junction with the M27 route. It goes westwards as Ophir Booysens Road, joined by the Pat Mbatha Bus & Taxiway (part of the Rea Vaya road system; lanes are reserved for buses in both directions), to fly over the M1 highway and bypass the Booysens Reserve suburb, where it changes its name to the Soweto Highway. It flies over the M17 route and reaches the FNB Stadium (Soccer City) in Nasrec, where it forms an interchange with the M5 route (Nasrec Road) before passing north of the stadium.

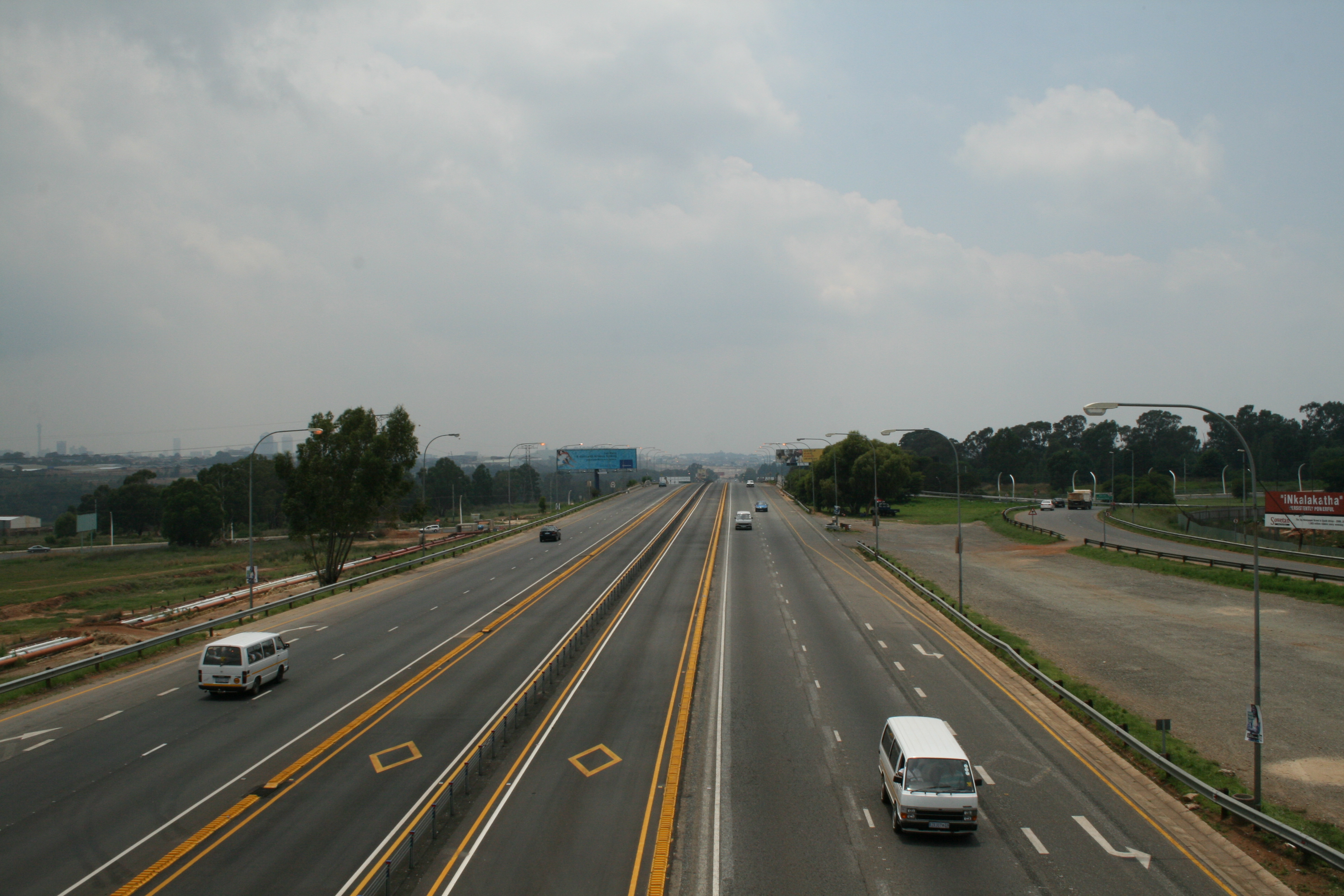
The Soweto Highway with dedicated taxiways

From the FNB Stadium, the M70 continues westwards as the Soweto Highway to meet the N1 highway (Johannesburg Western Bypass; southbound only) and cross it to enter the northern part of Soweto. It forms the northern border of Diepkloof (where it meets the northern terminus of the M83 route) before being the road separating Noordgesig in the north from Orlando East in the south, where it reaches a junction with the M10 route (New Canada Road). The M10 joins the M70 and they are one road westwards, crossing a railway into Orlando West, to reach a roundabout, where the M10 becomes the road southwards (Klipspruit Valley Road) and the road northwards is meant to be an extension of the N17 national route while the M70 remains as the westerly road.

From the M10/N17 junction, the M70 continues westwards, forming the northern border of Orlando West, becoming Modise street (no-longer named Soweto Highway), to pass through Meadowlands, where it changes its name to Van Onselen Road. Immediately after Meadowlands, it reaches its western terminus at a junction with the M77 route (Elias Motsoaledi Road) at Mmesi Park, just north of Dobsonville.
