= Southgate =

Southgate or South Gate may refer to:

== Places ==
- Taipei South Gate

=== Australia ===
- Southgate, Sylvania
- Southgate Arts and Leisure Precinct, an area within Southbank, Victoria

=== Canada ===
- Southgate, Ontario, a township in Grey County
- Southgate, a community in Middlesex Centre

=== New Zealand ===
- Southgate, New Zealand, a suburb of Wellington

=== South Africa ===
- Southgate, South Africa

=== South Korea ===
- Namdaemun, Seoul

=== United Kingdom ===
- Southgate, London, a suburban area of north London
  - Southgate (ward)
  - Enfield Southgate (UK Parliament constituency)
  - Southgate tube station, a London Underground station
  - Municipal Borough of Southgate, historic local government district
- New Southgate, a residential suburb in London, England
- SouthGate, a shopping centre in Bath, Somerset, England
- Southgate, Ceredigion, village in Ceredigion, Wales
- Southgate, Cheshire
- Southgate, Norfolk
- Southgate Estate, Runcorn, a housing development, demolished in 1990
- Southgate, Swansea
- Southgate, West Sussex, a neighbourhood in Crawley, West Sussex, England

=== United States ===
- South Gate, California
- Southgate, Florida
- South Gate, Indiana
- Southgate, Kentucky
- South Gate, Maryland
- Southgate, Michigan
- Southgate, Houston, a neighborhood
- Crossings at Siesta Key, formerly Southgate Plaza, in Sarasota, Florida
- Southgate, U.S. Virgin Islands

== People ==
- Southgate (surname)

== Other uses ==
- SS Southgate, a British ship
- Southgate (album), a 1998 album by Seventh Avenue
- Southgate Shopping Centre, Johannesburg, South Africa
- Southgate Shopping Center, Southgate, Michigan, United States
- Southgate Centre, Edmonton, Alberta, Canada
  - Southgate station (Edmonton)

== See also ==
- Southgate Mall (disambiguation)
- Southgate River, a river in British Columbia, Canada
