= M82 (Johannesburg) =

Metropolitan route in Greater Johannesburg, South Africa

Metropolitan route M82

Route information
- Maintained by Johannesburg Roads Agency and Gauteng Department of Roads and Transport
- Length: 8.3 km (5.2 mi)

Major junctions
- South end: M61
- R554 Swartkoppies Road
- North end: M95

Location
- Country: South Africa

Highway system
- Numbered routes of South Africa
← M81	→ M83

The M82 is a short metropolitan route in Greater Johannesburg, South Africa It connects various suburbs in Alberton.

== Route ==
The M81 begins as a T-junction with the Vereeniging Road (M61) near Alrode South and Katlehong. The route heads north-west through Albertsdal as Hennie Alberts Street. It crosses the R59 Sybrand van Niekerk Freeway as a flyover and turns northwards passing through Brackendowns and Brakenhurst. At the northern end of Brakenhurst it intersects and crosses Swartkoppies Road (R554). Continuing north, it soon ends in Meyersdal when it intersects Bellairs Drive and Nelson Mandela Avenue (M95).
