= Ram Salojee =

South African politician and activist (1933–2020)

Member of the National Assembly
- In office May 1994 – January 1996

Personal details
- Born: Rashid Ahmed Mahmood Salojee; 24 March 1933 Kliprivier, Transvaal; Union of South Africa
- Died: 2 December 2020 (aged 87) Westcliff, Johannesburg; Republic of South Africa
- Resting place: Westpark Cemetery
- Party: African National Congress
- Other political affiliations: Transvaal Indian Congress
- Spouse: Sara Salojee (m. 1960; died 2016)
- Education: Wits University (MBBCh)

Rashid Ahmed Mahmood "Ram" Salojee (24 March 1933 – 2 December 2020), often misspelled Ram Saloojee, was a South African politician, medical doctor, and former anti-apartheid activist. Between 1994 and 2009, he represented the African National Congress (ANC) in the Gauteng Provincial Legislature and both houses of Parliament.

Salojee rose to prominence through the local civic movement in Lenasia, where he ran a medical practice. His erstwhile political party, the People's Candidate Party, dominated the Lenasia Management Committee from 1973 until 1977, when Salojee changed his stance on participation in apartheid structures and withdrew from the committee. He subsequently became a prominent figure in the Congress-aligned anti-apartheid movement in the Transvaal, and from 1983 he served simultaneously as the vice-president of the Transvaal Indian Congress (TIC) and the Transvaal branch of the United Democratic Front (UDF).

== Early life and education ==
The eldest of twelve children, Salojee was born on 24 March 1933 on his family's farm in Kliprivier in the former Transvaal province. His nickname, Ram, comes from the first three initials of his name. His family had close links to Mahatma Gandhi's satyagraha movement, and his father was a leading member of the TIC. In addition to periods at the Ferreira Indian Primary School and Johannesburg Indian High School, Salojee spent five years at the Waterval Islamic Institute, where he studied the Quran.

After matriculating in 1951, Salojee attended the University of the Witwatersrand, where he completed a MBBCh in 1958. Much later, while serving in Parliament, Salojee wrote in a letter to the Mail & Guardian that, "I was never made to feel a part of my Alma Mater. Overt discrimination, subtle prejudices and exclusion from the social milieu left me feeling empty, deficient and unfulfilled." After a decade of practicing medicine in Nylstroom, he completed further training at Johannesburg's Coronation Hospital in 1964 and thereafter settled in Lenasia, where he spent much of the rest of his life.

== Anti-apartheid activism ==
While practicing medicine in Lenasia, Salojee became a prominent figure in the local civic movement. He was a founding member of the Lenasia Resident's and Ratepayers Association, among other organisations, and he was also active in local sport administration organisations, himself an ardent cricketer.

In 1973, Salojee established the People's Candidate Party (PCP) to contest the inaugural elections to the Lenasia Management Committee, established to give South African Indians nominal political representation in the governance of the area. The PCP performed exceedingly well in the elections, and Salojee was elected to the committee. According to Salojee, his participation in the committee was motivated by the objectives of advocating for residents' socioeconomic needs and preventing the committee from falling under the control of opportunists, but his stance was at odds with the mainstream of the Congress Alliance and Black Consciousness movement, both of which largely opposed such participation as legitimising apartheid structures.

In July 1977, in the aftermath of the Soweto uprising, Salojee announced that he had come to agree with the latter view and withdrew his party from the management committee. He denounced the committee as a "glorified advisory board" and said that Indians had nothing to gain from participating in apartheid structures. Later, when the Anti-SAIC Committee was established in the Transvaal to organise boycotts of the South African Indian Council, Salojee became one of the committee's vice-chairs.

I do remember him saying that he didn’t believe in any "isms". To young left-wing activists fired by revolutionary zeal, this statement of his did not make a particularly positive impression. He did not justify his actions merely on the basis that they were based on tradition – as in "Congress Tradition". He showed open intolerance for backward cultural and religious traditions. Actually, Ram Saloojee was way ahead of his time. He was a free-thinking activist at a time of quite moribund ideological dogmatism... He was the real Lenz pioneer of what we later called the "mass approach". He understood the need for mass mobilisation as the only means of making progress. He was of the view that mass action and mass organisation were far more effective than conspiracy. He did not elevate the worship of ideas above working among the masses... Comrade Ram Saloojee epitomised the activist of the United Democratic Front and the Mass Democratic Movement.

— Valli Moosa on Salojee's activism, December 2020

The activities of the Anti-SAIC Committee led to the formal relaunch of the TIC in May 1983, and Salojee was elected as deputy president of the congress, deputising Essop Jassat. Later the same year, the UDF was established, and Salojee became the vice-president of its Transvaal branch.

His increased visibility in the anti-apartheid movement through the TIC and UDF led in 1984 to increased persecution by the police's Security Branch. Following the UDF's largely successful campaign to boycott the 1984 general election, Salojee's house was raided, and he was detained at John Vorster Square from 21 August 1984 to 10 December 1984. Upon his release, he was subject to a banning order until July 1985, when he was arrested again while at work at his surgery. He was held in solitary confinement for 81 days before he was moved due to petitions by his wife and his lawyer, Priscilla Jana. Released on 11 November 1985, he was subject to another banning order, and he was detained once again from 12 June 1986 to 31 July 1986 following another raid at his home.

== Legislative career ==
In South Africa's first post-apartheid elections in 1994, Salojee was elected to represent the ANC in the National Assembly, the lower house of the new South African Parliament. He served in his seat until January 1996, when he was transferred to an ANC seat in the Senate.

He was subsequently moved again once more, now to Gauteng Provincial Legislature, where he was re-elected to full terms in 1999 and 2004 and where he served until he retired at the 2009 general election. In 2001, while chairing the provincial portfolio committee on health and during the HIV/AIDS epidemic, Salojee deviated from the position of President Thabo Mbeki's government in advocating for the provision of anti-retroviral drugs to rape victims.

During his last speech to the chamber in March 2009, Salojee reflected:

I sometimes feel unfulfilled. I do not know whether we are still living in the liberation struggle era or are we now in the modern era of an economic and industrial state... What about the vulnerable, the ill, the denied, the poor, the unemployed?... the poor who have [not been] given greater opportunities, which we have not been able to offer, unfortunately, even in the fifteen years of our democracy.

== Personal life and religion ==
Salojee was a devout Muslim and his religion fuelled his activism. Asked in a 1981 interview whether he feared the brutality of the apartheid state, he replied that his faith required him to "oppose injustice and racism. As a Muslim I am committed to act and function within the total existence of my faith, which makes no division between social, political, economic, and recreational spheres of life." He was president of the Islamic Council of South Africa in the mid-1990s, in which capacity he publicly condemned militant Muslim involvement in People Against Gangsterism and Drugs.

In February 1960, Salojee married Sara Makda, who predeceased him. They had two children, a daughter and a son. He was diagnosed with diabetes in 2011 and two of his limbs were amputated. He died on 2 December 2020 at his home in Westcliff, Johannesburg and was buried in accordance with Islamic rites at Westpark Cemetery.
