= Glenanda =

- Location within Gauteng Location within South Africa
- Coordinates: 26.272°S 28.038°E
- Country: South Africa
- Province: Gauteng
- Municipality: City of Johannesburg
- Main Place: Johannesburg

Area
  - Total: 1.29 km^{2} (0.50 sq mi)

Population (2011)
  - Total: 3,105

Racial makeup (2011)
  - Black African: 30.4%
  - Coloured: 7.0%
  - Indian/Asian: 16.2%
  - White: 41.9%
  - Other: 4.5%

First languages (2011)
  - English: 66.6%
  - Afrikaans: 9.3%
  - Zulu: 7.6%
  - Sotho: 4.2%
  - Other: 12.3%
- Time zone: UTC+2 (SAST)
- Postal code (street): 2091

Glenanda is a suburb of Johannesburg, South Africa. It is located in Region F. Glenanda borders the suburbs of Glenvista, Suideroord and Winchester Hills. Glenanda has its own public library, service station and local shopping centre. Glenanda Primary School was established there in 1976 and services Glenanda as well as the surrounding areas. Glenanda is in close proximity to The Glen Shopping Centre with an average travelling time of five minutes.

Glenanda previously had a local scout and venue hall which was subsequently converted into a church, with church services taking place every Sunday.
