= Eastcliff =

Eastcliff or East Cliff may refer to:

- Eastcliff, Johannesburg, a suburb of Johannesburg, South Africa
- Eastcliff, Pretoria, a suburb of Pretoria, South Africa
- East Cliff, Bournemouth, a suburb of Bournemouth in the United Kingdom
- Eastcliff (mansion), the residence of the president of the University of Minnesota
