= Mulbarton =

Mulbarton could refer to:

- Mulbarton, Norfolk, United Kingdom
- Mulbarton, Gauteng, South Africa
