= Southdale =

Southdale may refer to:

- Southdale (electoral district), a provincial electoral district in Manitoba, Canada, in southeast Winnipeg
- Southdale Center, the first fully enclosed and completely climate-controlled shopping mall in the US, located in Edina, Minnesota
- Southdale, Nova Scotia, a neighbourhood in Dartmouth, Nova Scotia
- Southdale, South Africa, a suburb of Johannesburg
