= Southgate (surname) =

Southgate is a surname. Notable people with the surname include:

- Colin Southgate (1938–2021), English businessman and Royal Opera House chairman
- Donald W. Southgate (1887–1953), American architect
- Dorothy Southgate (1889-1946) British organist and composer
- Elsie Southgate (1890–1946), British violinist and composer
- F. G. Southgate, British architect, engineer and surveyor
- Gareth Southgate (born 1970), English footballer and manager
- Horatio Southgate (1812–1894), American Episcopal priest
- Hugh McLellan Southgate (1871–1940), of Washington, D.C.
- Ivan Southgate, former name of Terri Rogers (1937–1999), English ventriloquist
- James H. Southgate (1859–1916), American spokesman for prohibition
- Jan Southgate (born 1955), English cricketer
- John Southgate (1926–1999), English clergyman
- Martha Southgate (born 1960), American novelist
- Matthew Southgate (born 1988), English golfer
- Maurice Southgate (1913–1990), British army officer; Special Operations Executive agent
- Richard Southgate (politician) (1774–1857), American attorney and politician
- Richard Southgate (clergyman) (1729–1795), English clergyman and numismatist
- Tony Southgate (born 1940), British engineer and racing car designer
- Troy Southgate (born 1965), British political activist
- Vaughan Southgate (born 1944), British medical parasitologist
- William Southgate (born 1941), New Zealand conductor and composer
- William Wright Southgate (1800–1849), American politician

== See also ==
- Southgate (disambiguation)
