= Liefde en Vrede =

- Location within Gauteng Location within South Africa
- Coordinates: 26.309°S 28.060°E
- Country: South Africa
- Province: Gauteng
- Municipality: City of Johannesburg
- Main Place: Johannesburg

Area
  - Total: 2.07 km^{2} (0.80 sq mi)

Population (2011)
  - Total: 4,086
  - Density: 1,970/km^{2} (5,110/sq mi)

Racial makeup (2011)
  - Black African: 69.5%
  - Coloured: 5.0%
  - Indian/Asian: 8.5%
  - White: 16.4%
  - Other: 0.6%

First languages (2011)
  - English: 37.4%
  - Zulu: 17.2%
  - Sotho: 13.5%
  - Tswana: 7.5%
  - Other: 24.5%
- Time zone: UTC+2 (SAST)

Liefde en Vrede (Love and Peace) is a suburb of Johannesburg, South Africa. It is located in Region F of the City of Johannesburg Metropolitan Municipality.

Liefde en Vriede is located next to Mulbarton. It is a small residential area which is still under development. Less than 10 years ago, this area was just an open terrain. The main attraction to Liefde en Vriede is the Lebanese Marionite Church which is the largest Catholic church in the South of Johannesburg. There are no commercial businesses or schools in Liefde en Vriede. The residents rely on the surrounding suburbs for all their commercial needs.
