= Rahima Moosa House =

Historic house in Johannesburg, South Africa

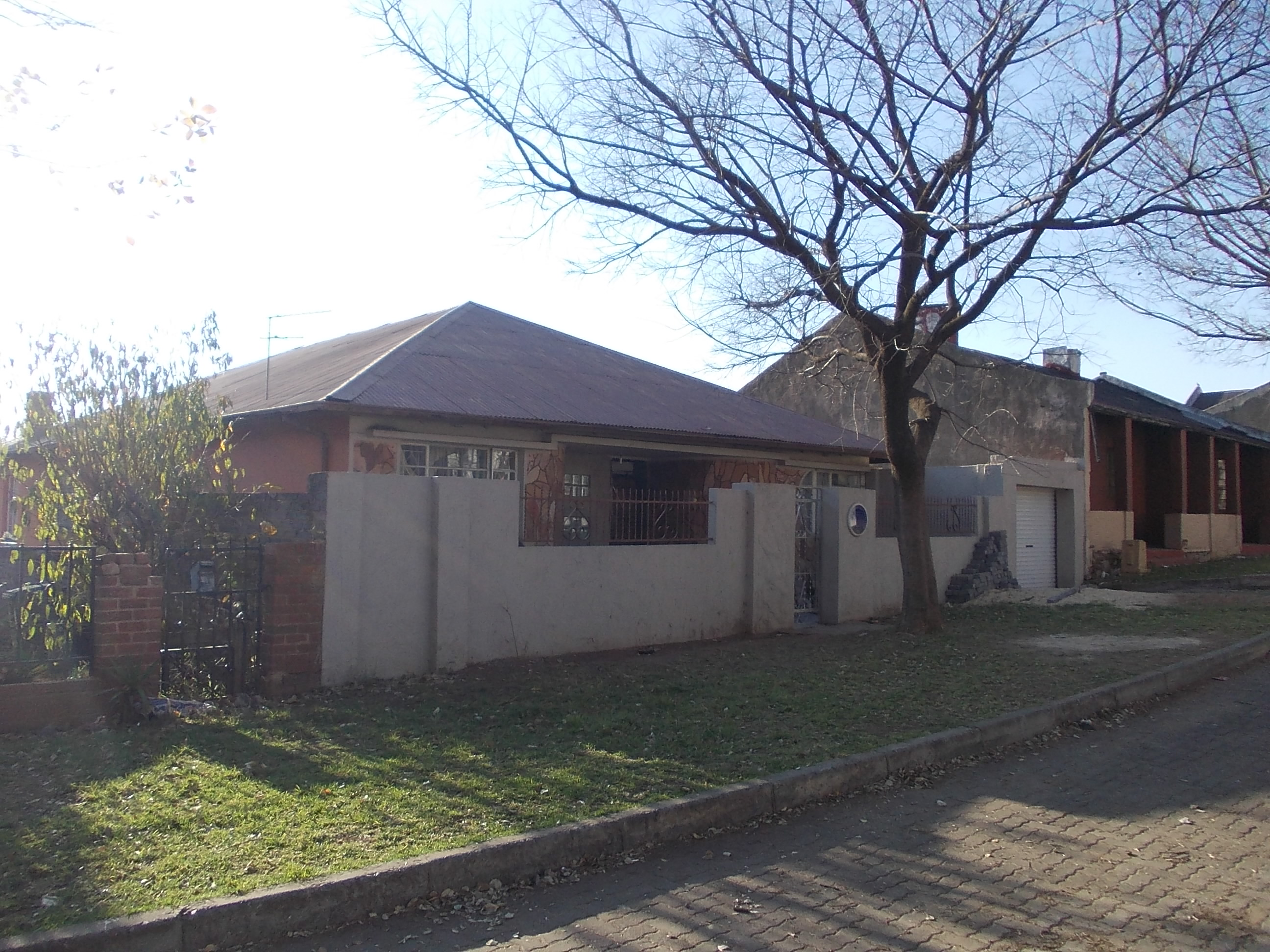
- Interactive map of the Rahima Moosa House area

General information
- Location: New Clare, Johannesburg, South Africa
- Coordinates: 26.185950673738404°S 27.96702034987935°E

The Rahima Moosa House is a historic dwelling located in Johannesburg, Gauteng, South Africa. At one time, it belonged to Rahima Moosa and Hassen Moosa. The house is located in New Clare Johannesburg and is registered as part of Johannesburg's historical heritage.

A blue plaque was installed on their house in 2013 as part of the Johannesburg heritage trail.
