= Rahima Moosa Mother and Child Hospital =

Coordinates: 26.188575°S 27.973238°E

Geography
- Location: Coronationville, Johannesburg, Gauteng, South Africa

Organisation
- Type: Maternity and Children; Teaching
- Affiliated university: University of Witwatersrand
- Network: Gauteng Department of Health

Services
- Emergency department: Yes
- Beds: 80 - 120

History
- Founded: 1944

Links
- Website: Rahima Moosa Hospital
- Lists: Hospitals in South Africa

Rahima Moosa Mother and Child Hospital is a maternity hospital in Coronationville, Johannesburg, South Africa. Prior to 2008, it was known as the Coronation Hospital.

== History ==
The hospital was opened in October 1944 in the suburb of Coronationville. It was a hospital established for people classified as Coloured and Indian. It would serve those local communities of Newclare, Noordgesig and Coronationville. Until 1955, it would also take black patients from Primville, Orlando and Sophiatown.

In 1995, all obstetrics and gynaecology departments were moved from the J.G. Strijdom Hospital to this hospital. On 29 September 2008, Coronation Hospital was renamed the Rahima Moosa Mother and Child Hospital by the Gauteng Provincial Minister of Health, Brian Hlongwa. Rahima Moosa was an anti-apartheid activist and took part in the 1956 Women's March, protesting passes for non-white women.
