= Oakdene, Johannesburg =

Oakdene
- Location within Gauteng Location within South Africa
- Coordinates: 26.265°S 28.052°E
- Country: South Africa
- Province: Gauteng
- Municipality: City of Johannesburg
- Main Place: Johannesburg

Area
  - Total: 2.92 km^{2} (1.13 sq mi)

Population (2011)
  - Total: 4,931
  - Density: 1,690/km^{2} (4,370/sq mi)

Racial makeup (2011)
  - Black African: 28.6%
  - Coloured: 6.6%
  - Indian/Asian: 11.1%
  - White: 52.0%
  - Other: 1.9%

First languages (2011)
  - English: 63.0%
  - Afrikaans: 10.7%
  - Zulu: 5.3%
  - Sotho: 4.6%
  - Other: 16.4%
- Time zone: UTC+2 (SAST)
- Postal code (street): 2190

Oakdene is a wealthy suburb of Johannesburg, South Africa. It is located in Region F of the City of Johannesburg Metropolitan Municipality.

It borders Glenvista and Bassonia to the South and Eastcliff to the North.
