= Framton =

- Coordinates: 26°13′40″S 28°01′10″E
- Country: South Africa
- Province: Gauteng
- Municipality: City of Johannesburg
- Main Place: Johannesburg

Area
  - Total: 0.1 km^{2} (0.04 sq mi)

Framton is a suburb of Johannesburg, South Africa, just south of the CBD and neighbouring the suburb of Booysens. It is located in Region F of the City of Johannesburg Metropolitan Municipality.

== History ==
The suburb was proclaimed on 11 November 1964 and is named after Morris Herbert Fram.
