= Southgate Mall =

Southgate Mall may refer to:

== United States ==
- Southgate Shopping Center in Southgate, Michigan
- Westfield Southgate, formerly Southgate Plaza, in Sarasota, Florida
- Southgate Mall (Elizabeth City) in Elizabeth City, North Carolina
- Southgate Mall (Missoula) in Missoula, Montana
- Southgate Mall (Muscle Shoals) in Muscle Shoals, Alabama

== Canada ==
- Southgate Centre in Edmonton, Alberta

== South Africa ==
- Southgate Shopping Centre in Johannesburg
