= Rahima Moosa =

South African anti-Apartheid activist

- Born: October 14, 1922; Strand, Western Cape
- Died: May 29, 1993 (aged 70)
- Occupation: Activist
- Known for: National uprising of women in 1956
- Political party: African National Congress
- Children: 4

Rahima Moosa OLS (13 October 1922 – 29 May 1993) was a member of the Transvaal Indian Congress and later the African National Congress. She is well known for the role she played in the national uprising of women on 9 August 1956. Moosa was also a shop steward for the Cape Town Food and Canning Workers Union.

== Her life ==
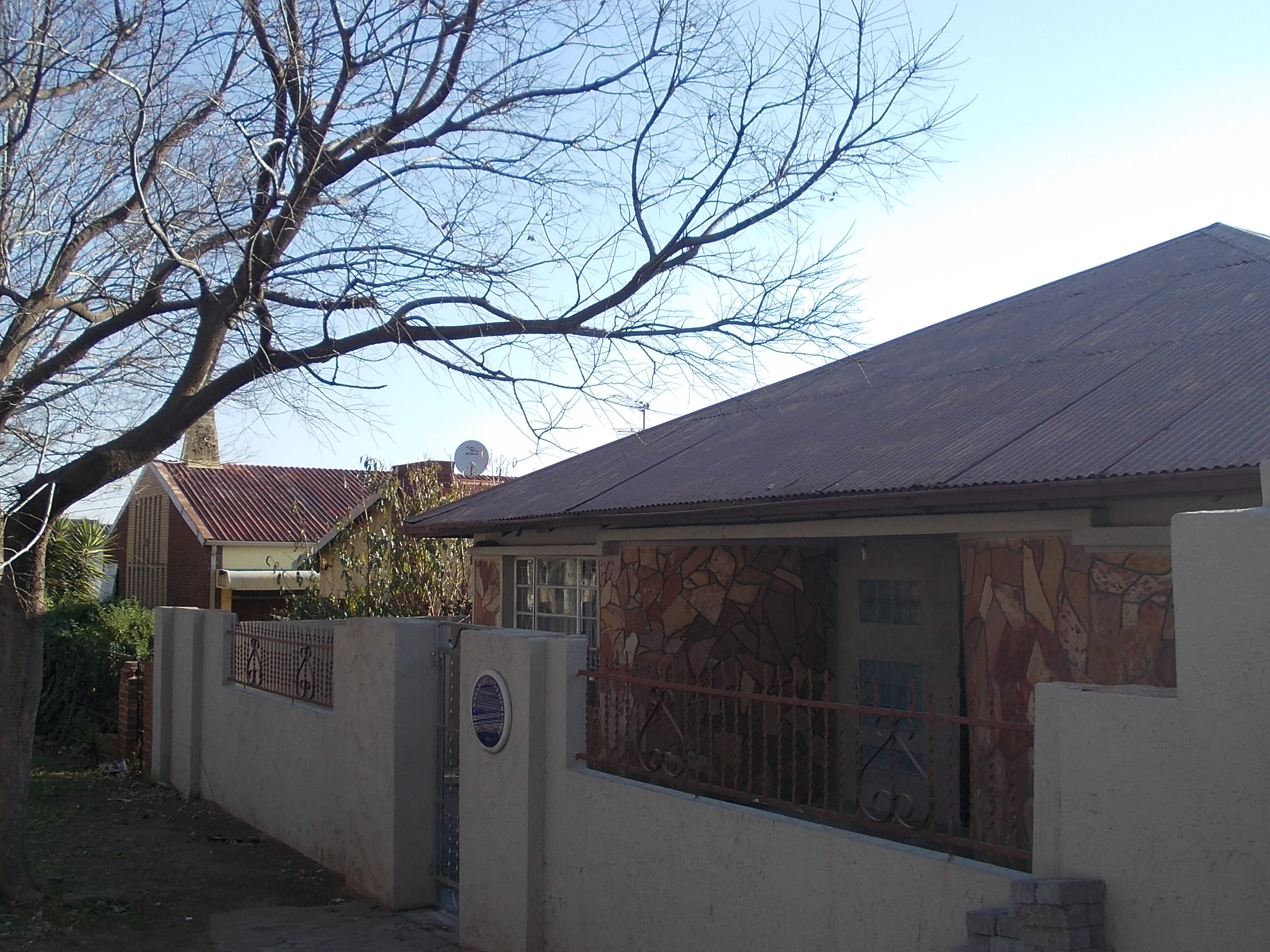
The Rahima Moosa House in Johannesburg.

Rahima Moosa was one of identical sisters born in Strand just outside Cape Town in 1922. She was brought up in a liberated Islamic environment and she attended Trafalgar High School in District Six. She dropped out of school with little formal education. Annoyed by the policies of the Apartheid government she and her twin sister Fatima campaigned for change. Rahima was a shop steward and in 1951 she married her comrade activist Dr. Hassen “Ike” Mohamed Moosa who had already stood trial for treason. They moved to Johannesburg and had four children. Both of them were very active in the South African Indian Congress and later the African National Congress. Together they played a role organising the 1955, she was also on the forefront of the womans day march representing indian woman during apartheid Congress of the People and the Freedom Charter. Rahima, Sophia De Bruyn, Helen Joseph and Lillian Ngoyi led 20,000 women's march on 9 August 1956 to demonstrate against the further strengthening of Pass Laws. This day is now celebrated annually as National Women's Day.

Rahima Moosa was listed by the Apartheid regime despite becoming ill after a heart attack in the 1960s. She died on 26 May 1993, a year before South Africa's first democratic elections in 1994. Her husband and her children remained active in the African National Congress after her death. In 2008, Rahima Moosa Mother and Child Hospital was named after her.
