= Ennerdale, South Africa =

Ennerdale
- Location within Gauteng Location within South Africa
- Coordinates: 26°24′35″S 27°50′13″E
- Country: South Africa
- Province: Gauteng
- Municipality: City of Johannesburg
  - Councillor: (PA)

Area
  - Total: 21.33 km^{2} (8.24 sq mi)

Population (2011)
  - Total: 71,815
  - Density: 3,367/km^{2} (8,720/sq mi)

Racial makeup (2011)
  - Black African: 65.7%
  - Coloured: 32.9%
  - Indian/Asian: 0.6%
  - White: 0.1%
  - Other: 0.7%

First languages (2011)
  - Afrikaans: 19.6%
  - English: 18.4%
  - Zulu: 17.6%
  - Sotho: 16.1%
  - Other: 28.3%
- Time zone: UTC+2 (SAST)
- Postal code (street): 1830
- PO box: 1826

Ennerdale is a town in the City of Johannesburg Metropolitan Municipality in Gauteng, South Africa. Ennerdale was declared as a coloured group area under the apartheid regime.

According to Crankshaw (2022),

'the coloureds-only suburb of Ennerdale, which was developed later during the 1980s, was built for homeownership by the private sector and home loans were financed by private banks (Lupton, 1991: pp.20–1; 1993).'

Even though apartheid ended in 1994, people still regard the town as a Coloured community.

== Bibliography ==
Lupton, Malcolm H. (1993) Ennerdale New Town, South Africa: The Social Limits to Urban Design. GeoJournal 30 (1): 37–44.

Lupton, Malcolm H. (1993) Collective Consumption and Urban Segregation in South Africa: The Case of Two Colored Suburbs in the Johannesburg Region, Antipode 25(1): 32–50.
