= Booysens (Johannesburg) =

- Booysens's location in Gauteng
- Coordinates: 26°13′50″S 28°01′30″E
- Country: South Africa
- Province: Gauteng
- City: Johannesburg

Area ref sb-201
  - Total: 0.83 km^{2} (0.32 sq mi)

Population
  - Estimate (2011): 3,163
  - Density: 3,811/km^{2} (9,870/sq mi)

Races
  - White: 7.2%
  - Asian: 14.9%
  - Cape Coloured: 4.0%
  - Black: 73.5%
  - Other: 0.5%

Languages
  - English: 23.7%
  - Zulu: 17.1%
  - Xhosa: 10.8%
  - Tswana: 6.8%
  - Other: 41.7%

Booysens is a suburb of Johannesburg, South Africa, located around 3.2 km southwest of city hall.

Booysens is bordered on the southwest by Robertsham, on the northwest by Framton, on the north by Ophirton, on the east by the Robinson Deep mine, and on the south from east to west by Turffontein, West Turffontein, and Southdale. North of Booysens Road, the area is predominantly industrial on its border with Ophirton, and most residents live to the south of that road.

== History ==
Booysens was laid out in 1887 on the eponymous farm of J.A. Booysens. Over the course of the 20th century, the population grew more Afrikaans-speaking over time, from 442 Afrikaans to 754 English-speakers in 1934 to a 383:241 ratio in 1949 to a 1,017:387 in 1961. Emigration left it only 7.2% white by 2011.

== Sources ==
- Raper, Peter Edmund. 2004. New Dictionary of South African Place Names. Johannesburg/Cape Town: Jonathan Ball Publishers.
- Stals, Prof. Dr. E.L.P (ed.) (1978). Afrikaners in die Goudstad, vol. 1: 1886 - 1924. Cape Town/Pretoria: HAUM.
