= M83 (Johannesburg) =

Metropolitan route in Johannesburg, South Africa

Metropolitan route M83

Route information
- Maintained by Johannesburg Roads Agency and Gauteng Department of Roads and Transport

Major junctions
- North end: M68
- South end: M70

Location
- Country: South Africa

Highway system
- Numbered routes of South Africa
← M82	→ M84

The M83 is a short metropolitan route in Greater Johannesburg, South Africa.

== Route ==
The M83 begins at the M68 and ends at the M70.
