= Alberton, South Africa =

Alberton
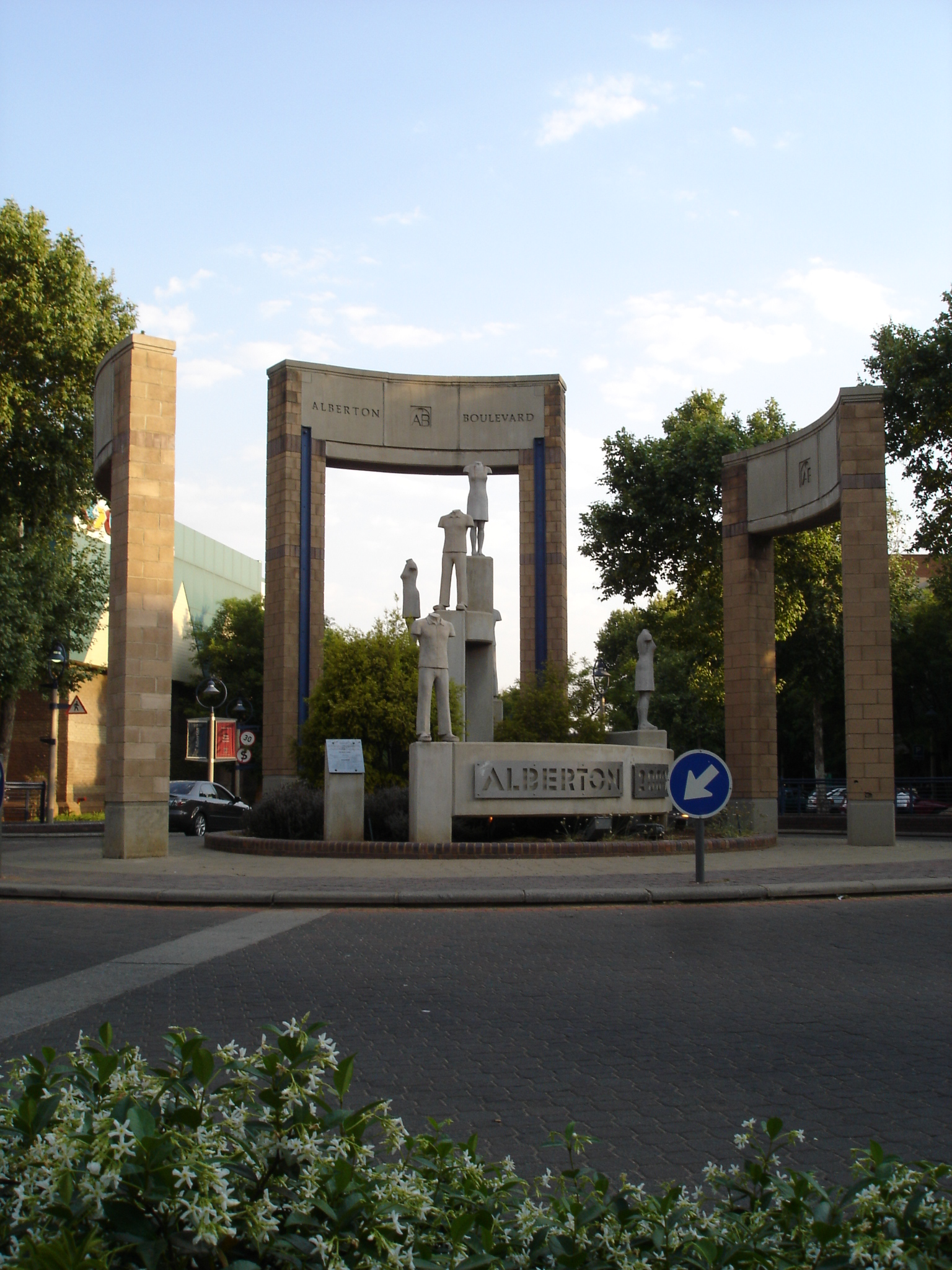
- Alberton Boulevard

- Location within Gauteng Location within South Africa Location within Africa
- Coordinates: 26°16′02″S 28°07′19″E
- Country: South Africa
- Province: Gauteng
- Municipality: Ekurhuleni

Area
  - Total: 77.16 km^{2} (29.79 sq mi)
- Elevation: 1,570 m (5,150 ft)

Population (2011)
  - Total: 121,536
  - Density: 1,575/km^{2} (4,080/sq mi)

Racial makeup (2011)
  - Black African: 26.5%
  - Coloured: 14.4%
  - Indian/Asian: 4.9%
  - White: 53.2%
  - Other: 0.9%

First languages (2011)
  - Afrikaans: 42.4%
  - English: 34.6%
  - Zulu: 6.9%
  - Sotho: 5.1%
  - Other: 11.0%
- Time zone: UTC+2 (SAST)
- Postal code (street): 1447 up to 1458, 1481
- PO box: 1450
- Area code: 011
- Website: www.alberton.co.za

Alberton is a town situated on the southern part of the East Rand of the Gauteng Province in South Africa, just south-east of the major urban centre of Johannesburg.

Alberton is described as a typical suburban community, one which is primarily residential in character, with most of its workers commuting to work in nearby suburbs or cities such as Johannesburg and Germiston.

== History ==
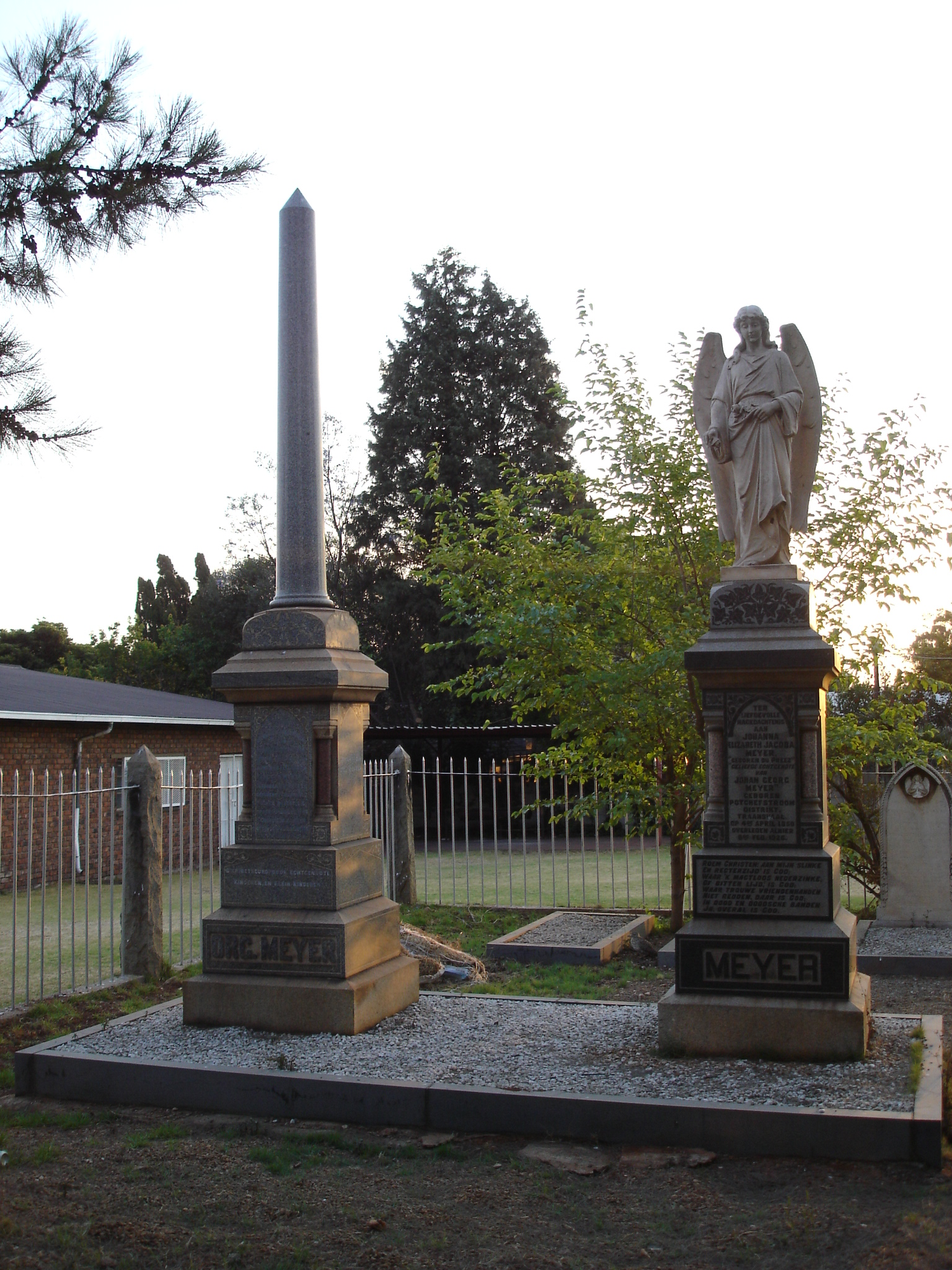
Org Meyer's Grave

In the early 1840s, the Voortrekkers Johan Georg (Org) Meyer and Hester Catharina Elizabeth (née Mulder) arrived in the Transvaal after moving from their home in Prince Albert, in what was then the Cape Colony.

Org sourced land and selected three farms, namely Klipriviersberg, Elandsfontein and Swartkoppies. In 1856, Johannes Petrus Meyer (better known as Jan Meyer) acquired 11 hectares (27 acres) of his father's Elandsfontein farm and built a house next to the Natalspruit, close to where the civic centre stands today. In 1890, he built a new farmhouse mansion on the opposite end of the farm that was miraculously left unharmed during the Anglo Boer War of 1899–1902. The homestead can still be seen today from the bypassing N12 freeway. Jan's brother, also Johan Georg (Org) Meyer, took over the farm after Jan's death. General Hendrik Abraham Alberts, a veteran of the Anglo Boer War, purchased a part of the farm from Org in 1904 and named it Alberton.

The Afrikaans medium primary school Jan Meyer was named for the original owner of the farm, and the affluent suburb Meyersdal also refers to the family whose original farmhouse mansion still stands on the land behind the Meyersdal koppie. The primary school Generaal Alberts, and Hennie Alberts Avenue in the suburb of Brackenhurst, are named after the town founder.

The first official post office was opened in 1926, and in 1938 building work started on a town hall. In the same year, street names in the Alberton North suburb were renamed after Voortrekker leaders to coincide with the 100 year commemoration of the Great Trek. A well-known landmark of the city, ABC STORE, was established in 1943 on Pieter Uys Avenue, Alberton North, and is still trading today as a general store specializing in school uniforms.

Alberton was incorporated into the City of Ekurhuleni Metropolitan Municipality governing the East Rand in the year 2000 and celebrated its centenary year in 2005.

== Demographics ==
According to the 2011 census conducted by Statistics South Africa, Alberton had a population of 121,536; but this figure excludes the black township of Thokoza, which has a population of 105,827.

== Geography ==
Alberton lies at an elevation of approximately 1,570 m (5,150 ft) above sea level on the banks of the Natal Spruit, approximately 11 km south-east of Johannesburg CBD, 59 km south of Pretoria and 49 km north-east of Vereeniging. Organisationally and administratively, it is included in the City of Ekurhuleni Metropolitan Municipality.

Alberton is bordered by the city of Germiston to the north-east, the townships of Thokoza and Katlehong to the east, and the city of Johannesburg to the west and north-west.

=== Cityscape ===
The city's initial centre of development was in the area now known as Alberton North or 'Old' Alberton. The original black settlement in Alberton was in the area of the Alberton Dam. During the apartheid era, inhabitants were moved to the surrounding black townships and a 'white' suburb was established around the dam and named Verwoerdpark, after former prime minister Hendrik Verwoerd. Over the years, development sprawled out into adjacent areas, and today Alberton is made up of 19 suburbs stretching over an area of 77 km^{2}. The city, as per South African in whole, is no longer segregated although surrounding black townships (which are now also not exclusively black) still remain.

=== Suburbs ===
- Alberante
- Albertsdal
- Alberton North
- Alrode
- Brackendowns
- Brackenhurst
- Eden Park
- Florentia
- General Albertspark
- Mayberry Park
- Meyersdal
- New Redruth
- Newmarket Park
- Palm Ridge
- Raceview
- Randhart
- South Crest
- Sky City
- Verwoerdpark

Alrode, which is Alberton's industrial suburb, was established in 1943. One of the most notable industries to be established in the town during this time was CJ Fuchs (Pty) Ltd. Venturing into the production of domestic electrical appliances under licence from the American company Westing House Electric International, the business was relocated from central Johannesburg to a newly built, modern factory in Alrode in 1948. Until the mid-seventies, CJ Fuchs (Pty) Ltd would continue to grow into a multi-million Rand operation, employing thousands of people in several subsidiary companies within the group. After Carl Fuchs' death in April 1976, the company was sold to the then Barlow Rand. In 1973, he was also the first to be admitted as a Freeman of the Town of Alberton.

The construction of the Alberton Boulevard was a major development started in the late 1980s with the aim of converting a section of Voortrekker Road that runs past the Alberton City Shopping Mall into a pedestrian-friendly zone.

== Transport ==
Alberton has multiple access roads to some of the major freeways in the Gauteng Province such as the R59, N12, N17 and N3.

The R59 Sybrand van Niekerk Freeway is the main highway running through Alberton, separating its western suburbs of Brackenhurst, Brackendowns and Meyersdal from the rest of the town. The regional highway connects Alberton with Vereeniging, Sasolburg and Bloemfontein (via the N1) to the south-west, and Johannesburg to the north-west.

The N12 Southern Bypass Freeway runs north of Alberton connecting the town with Soweto and Potchefstroom to the west and with Benoni and eMalahleni to the north-east. The N17 Freeway runs north-east of Alberton connecting the town with Springs to the east and the N3 Freeway partially borders Alberton to the west at its eastern suburb of Verwoerdpark connecting the town with Johannesburg to the north-west and with Heidelberg and Durban to the south-east.

Local major routes in Alberton include: the R554 (Swartkoppies Road; Nederveen Highway) leading north-eastwards to Brakpan and westwards to Lenasia, the R103 (Heidelberg Road) leading south-east to Heidelberg, the M7 (Kliprivier Drive) to Johannesburg, the M31 (Voortrekker Road) to Johannesburg, the M48 (Van Riebeeck Avenue) leading northwards to Rand Airport and Germiston, the M61 (Vereeniging Road) to Vereeniging, the M94 (Kritzinger Road/Grey Avenue) to Germiston, and the M95 (Nelson Mandela Avenue) to Johannesburg South.

== Sports ==
There are many well-established sports facilities and clubs for tennis, rugby, road running, boxing, wrestling, cricket, jukskei, netball, hockey, soccer, bowls, korfball and ring tennis in Alberton.

It is also home to the Reading Country Club and Golf Course.

Alberton was also home to the now defunct New Market Race Course, which is now a shopping mall.

== Parks and greenspace ==
Alberton borders on the Klipriviersberg Nature Reserve, located on Peggy Vera Road, Kibler Park, Gauteng (26°18′13″S 28°0′39″E). This reserve is home to many wild animals, including zebra, red hartebeest, porcupines, black wildebeest, otters, blesbok, springbok, duiker and 170 bird species.

There are also Iron Age settlements dating from about 1500 and the ruins of a house built in 1850 by voortrekker Sarel Marais.

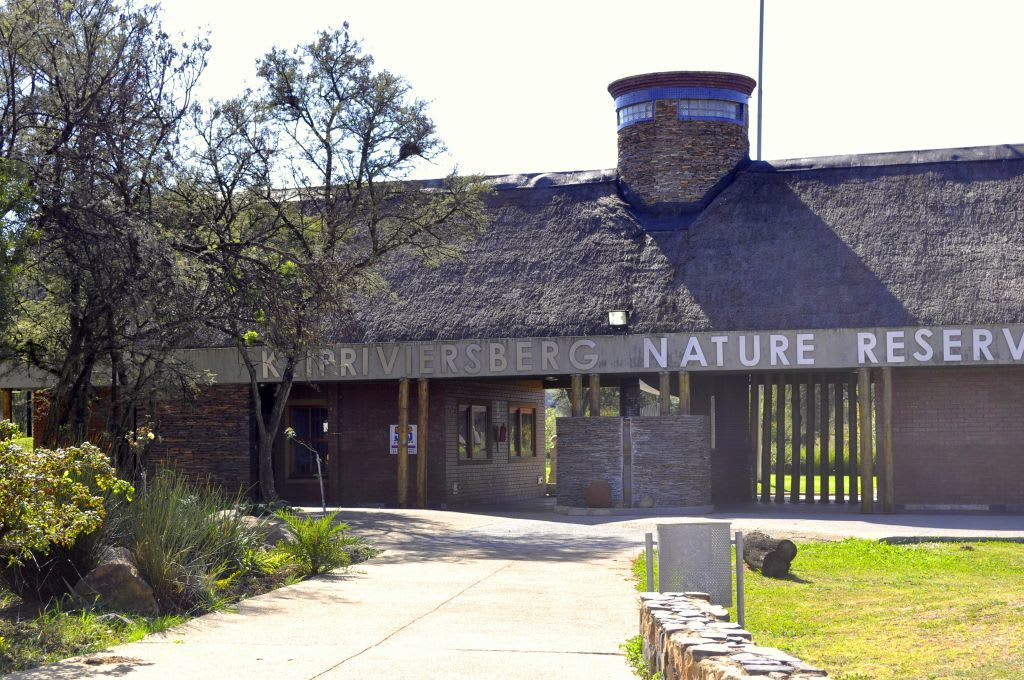

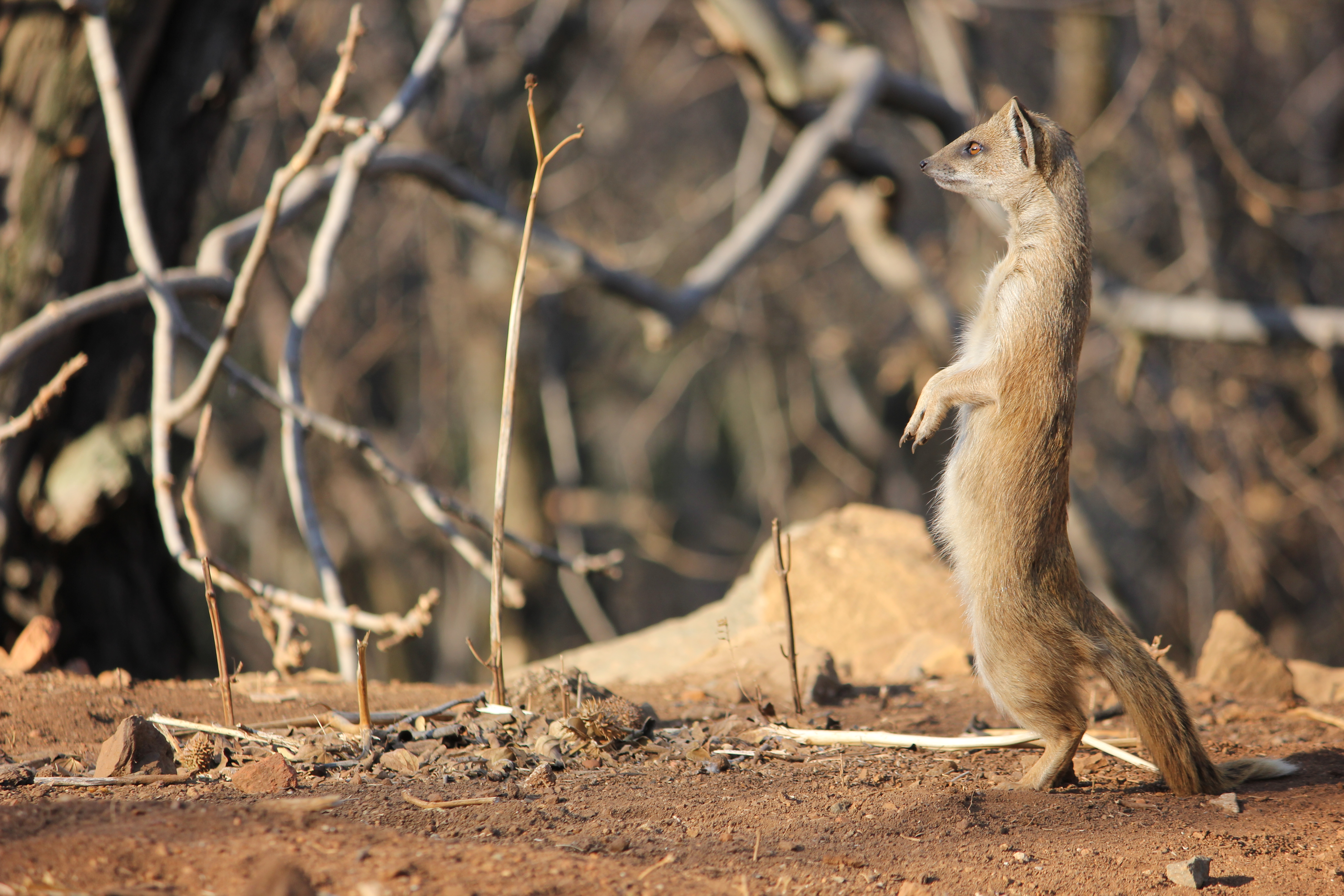

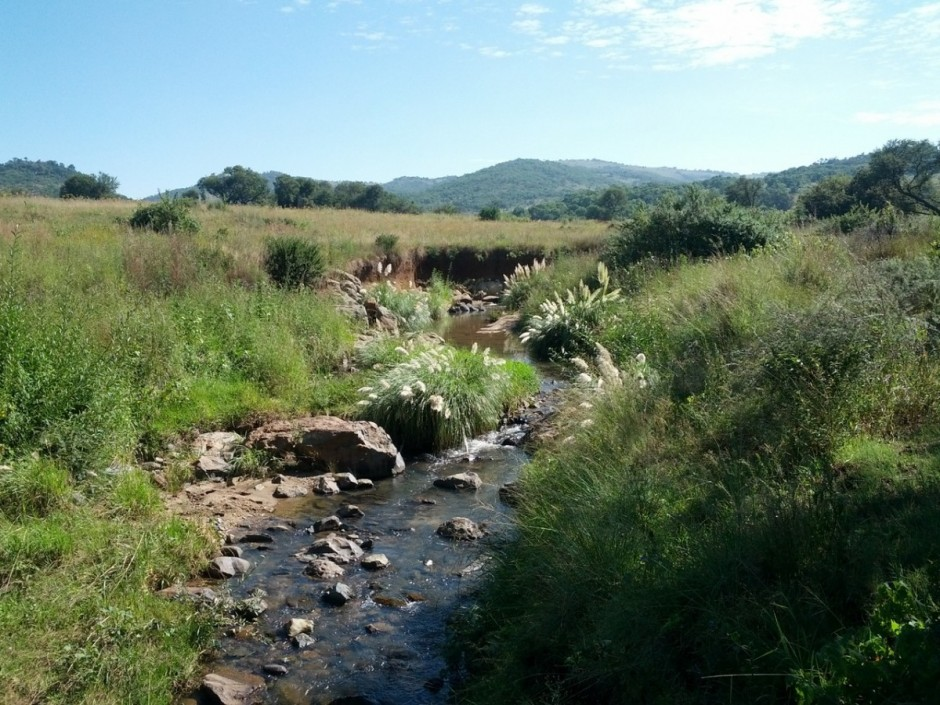

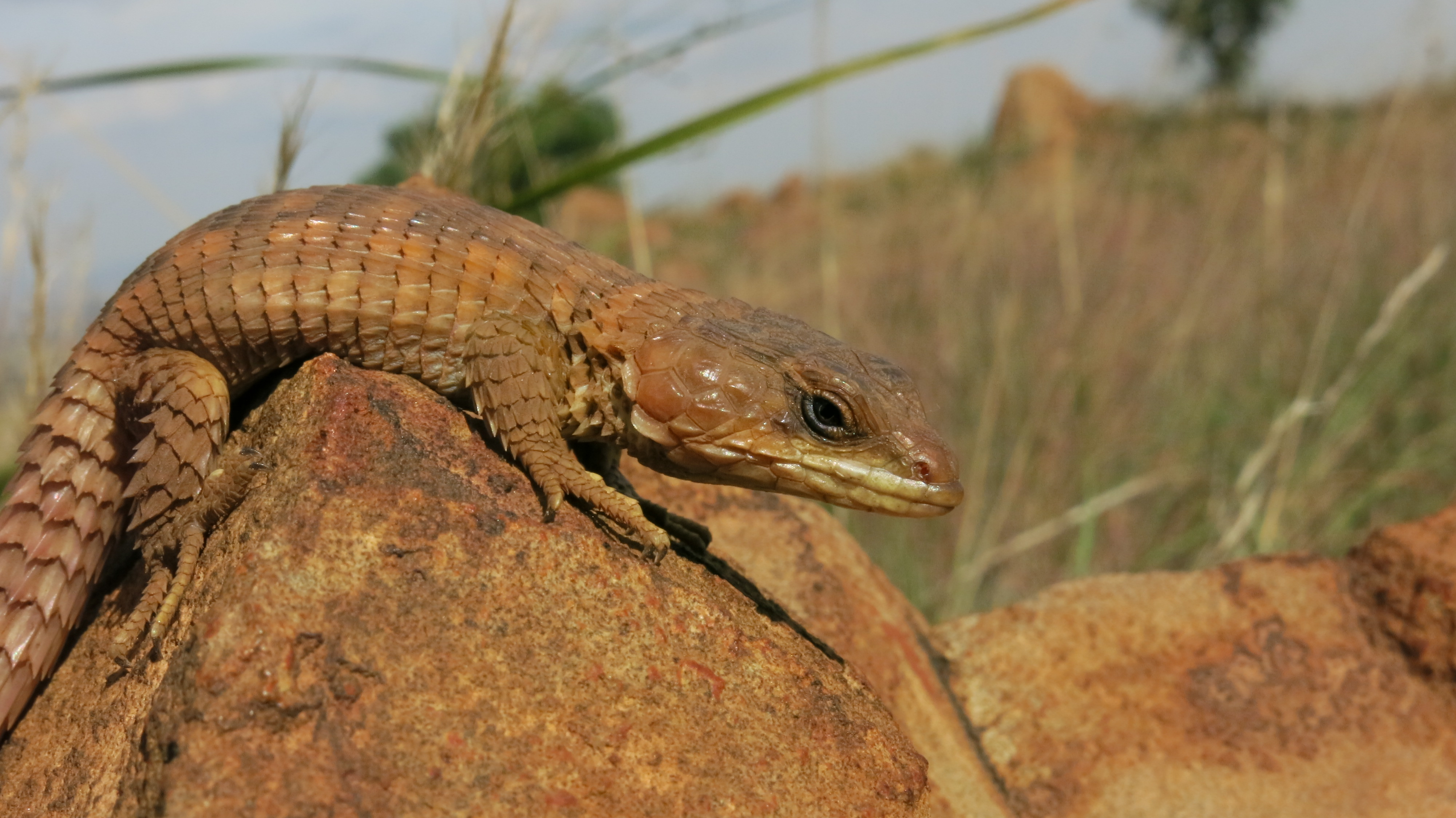

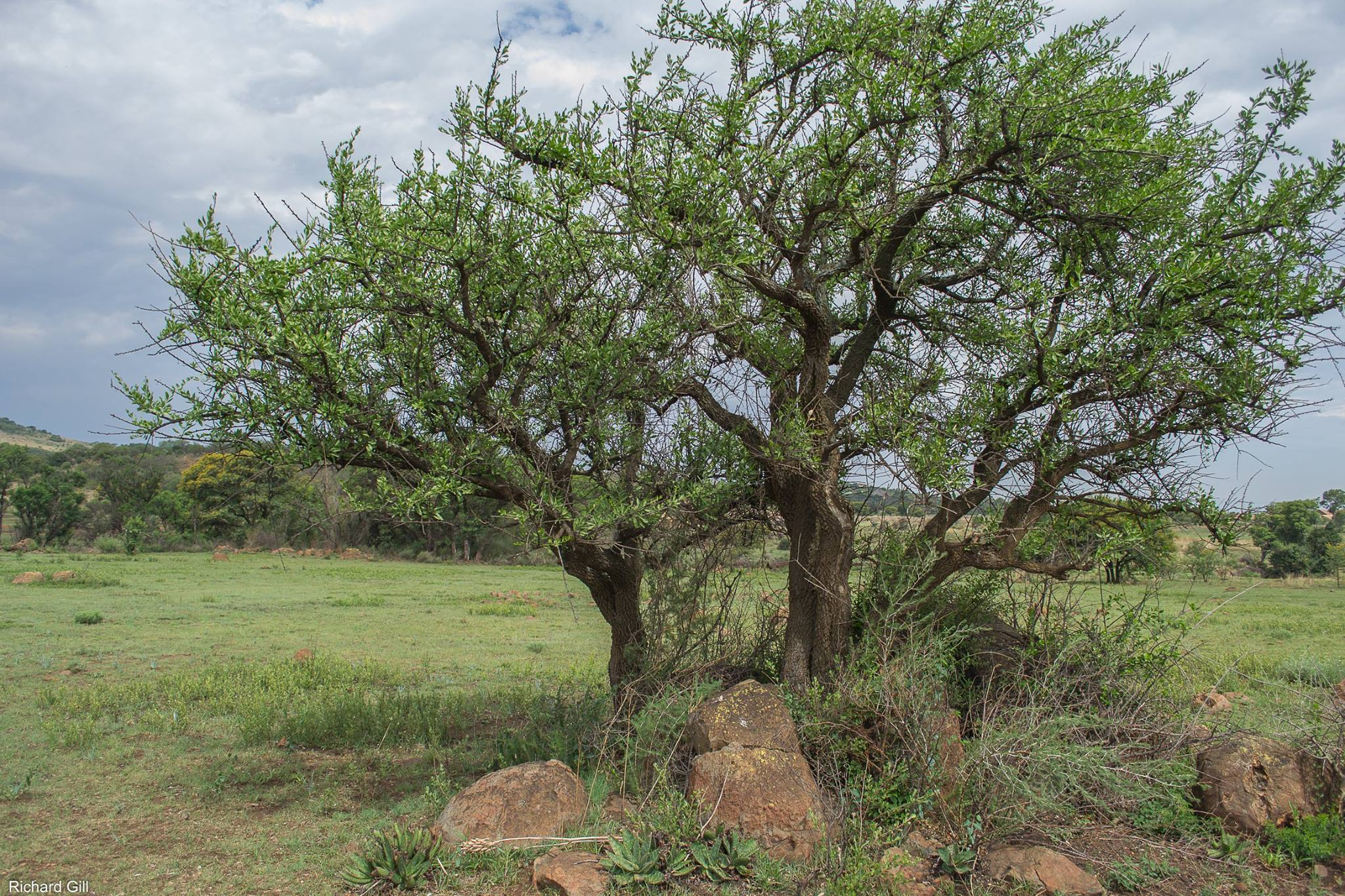

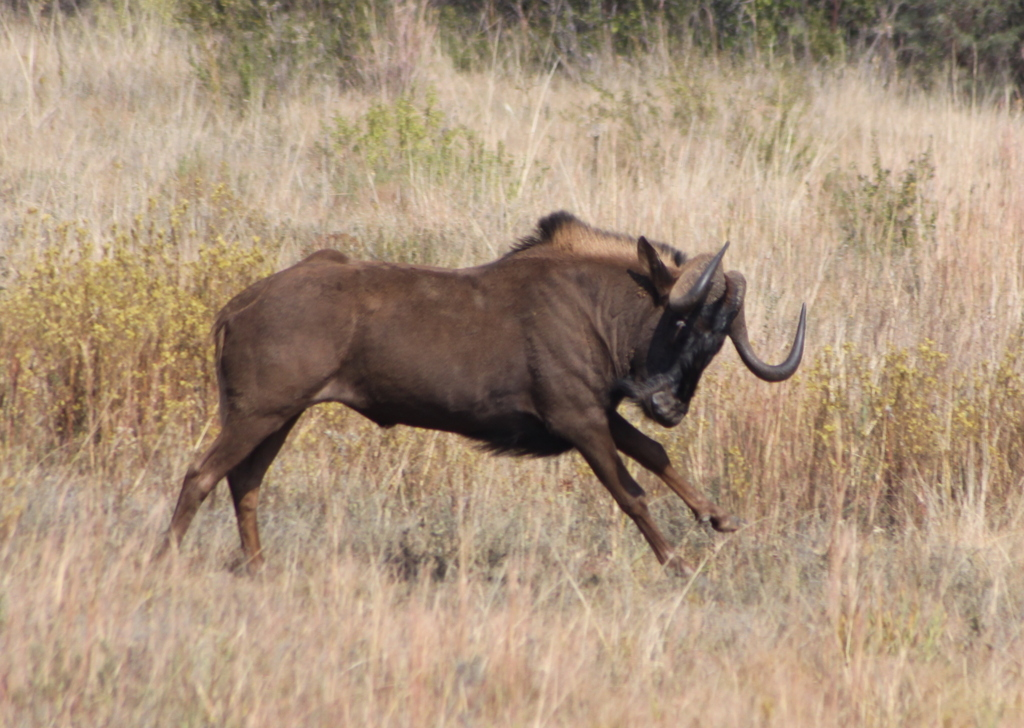

== Infrastructure ==
=== Health ===
Healthcare facilities include numerous government clinics as well the privately run Netcare Alberton hospital, formerly the Union Hospital and Clinton Clinic respectively.

== Notable residents (past and present) ==
- Japie Mulder (Springbok rugby player)
- Arnold Vosloo (Actor)
- Carl Niehaus (Politician)
- Andrew Hall (Protea cricketer)
- André Pretorius (Springbok rugby player)
- Bernadette Coston (Protea and Olympian hockey player)
- Malcolm Marx (Springbok rugby player)
- Ruan Combrinck (Springbok rugby player)
- Gert van der Merwe (Paralympic athlete)
- Marais Viljoen (State President of South Africa)
- Leyton Fourie (Racing driver)

== Earthquake ==
On June 11, 2023, Alberton experienced a notable earthquake that originated approximately 2 km from Alberton. Preliminary measurements by the US Geological Survey indicate a magnitude of 5.0 on the Richter scale. The earthquake struck at a depth of around 10 kilometers. Residents from Johannesburg noted that it was the worst earthquake in 6 years.

== Gallery ==
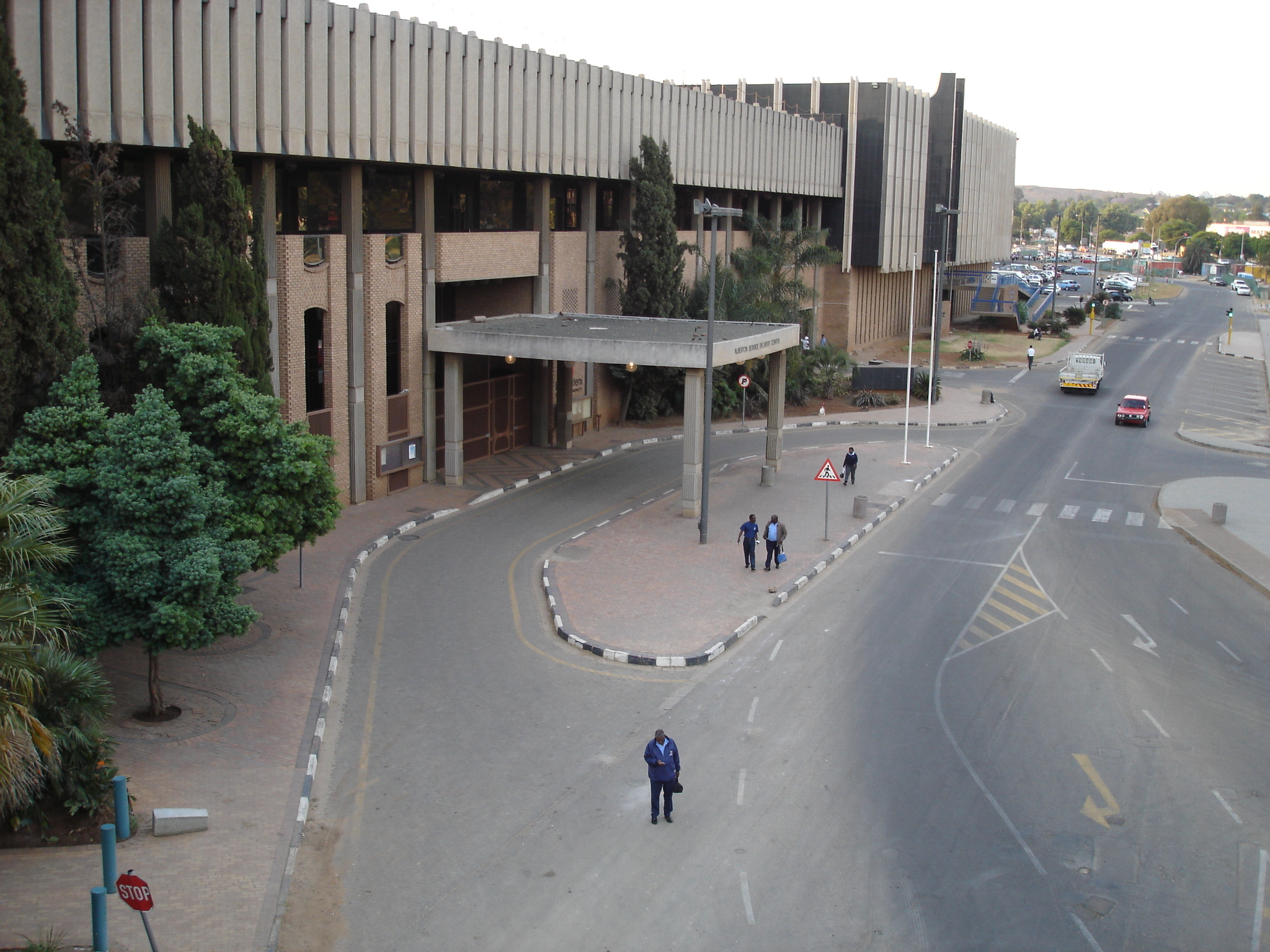
Civic Centre looking west

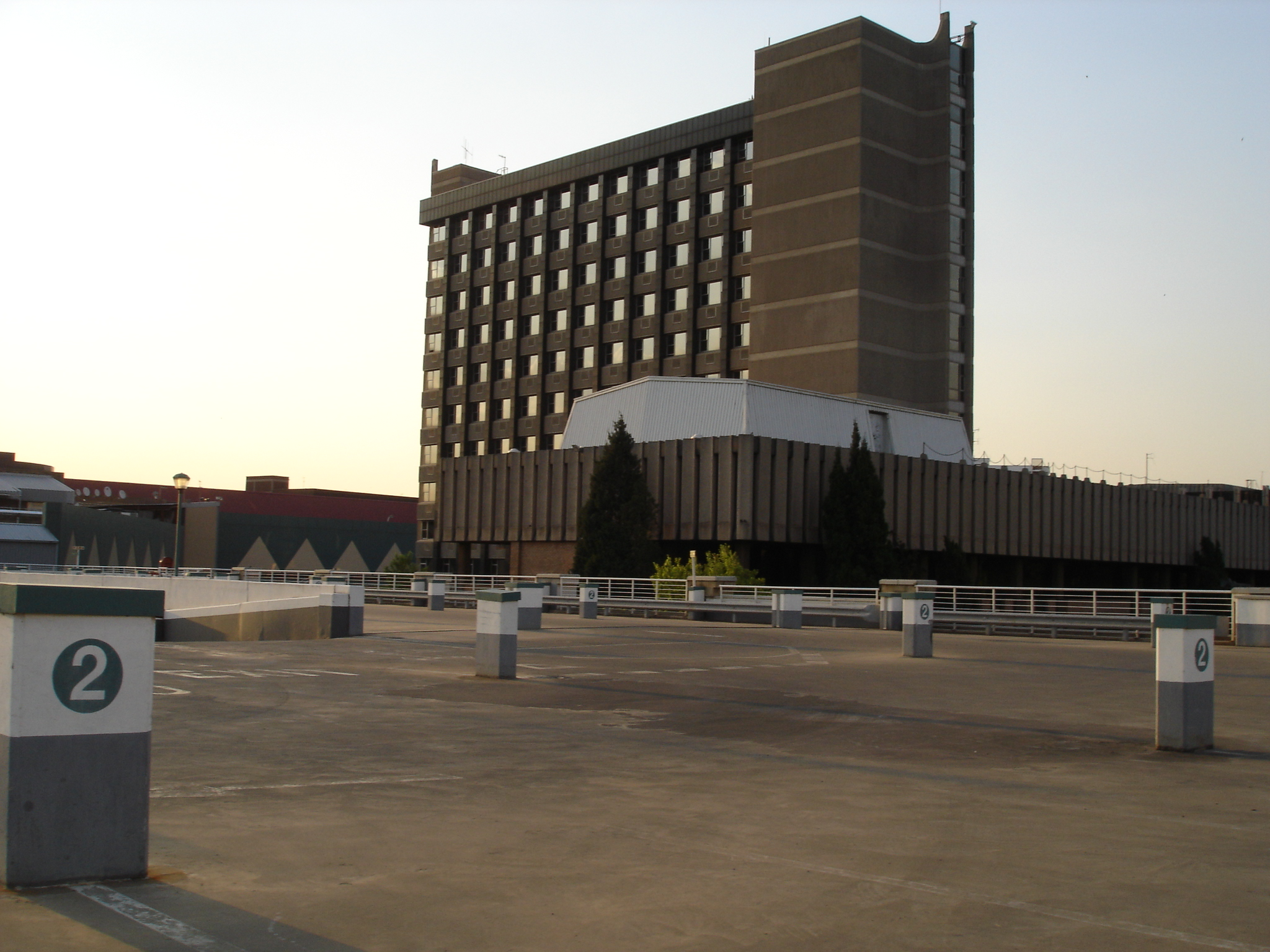
Civic Centre from Alberton City rooftop

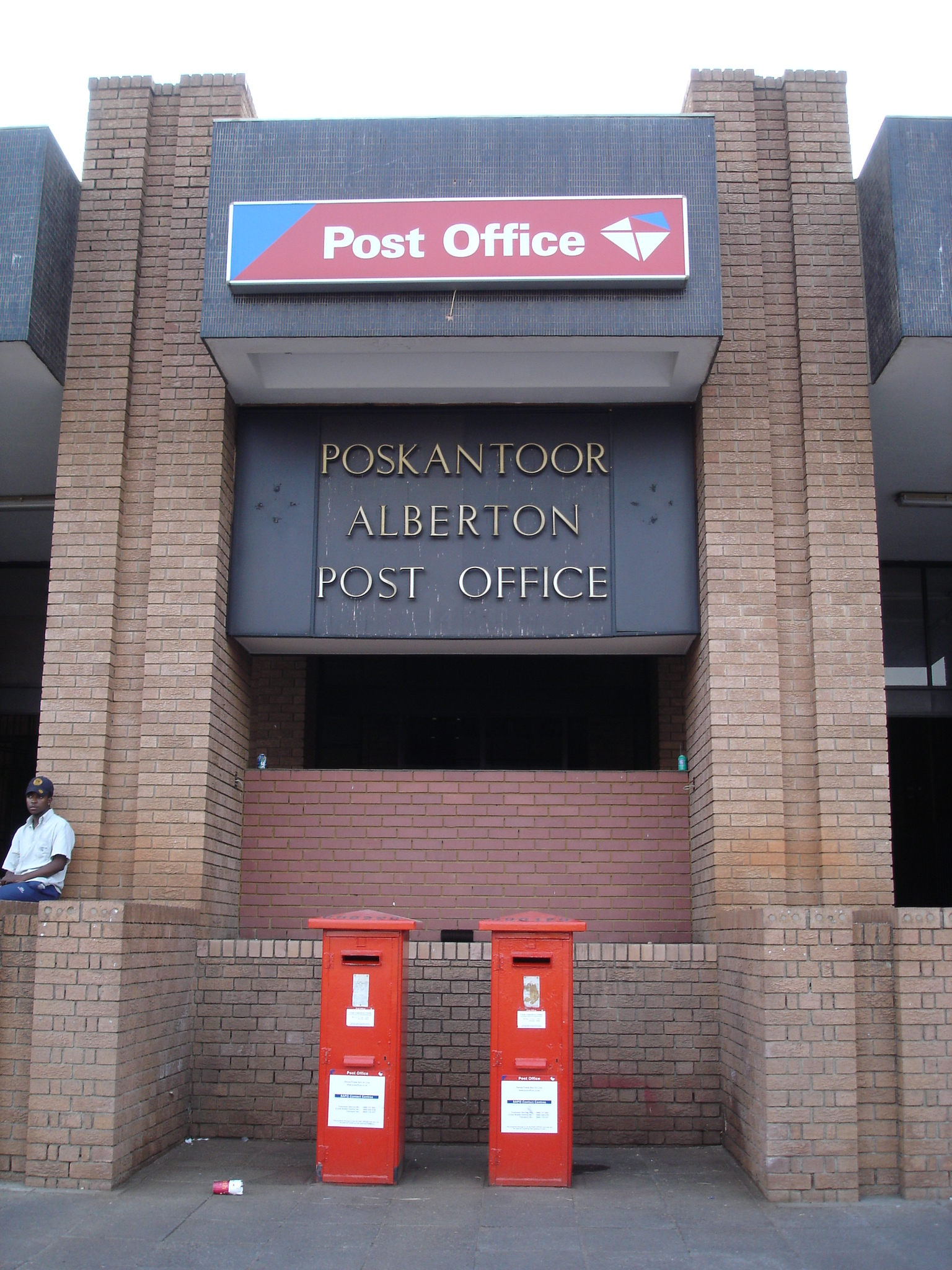
Alberton main post office

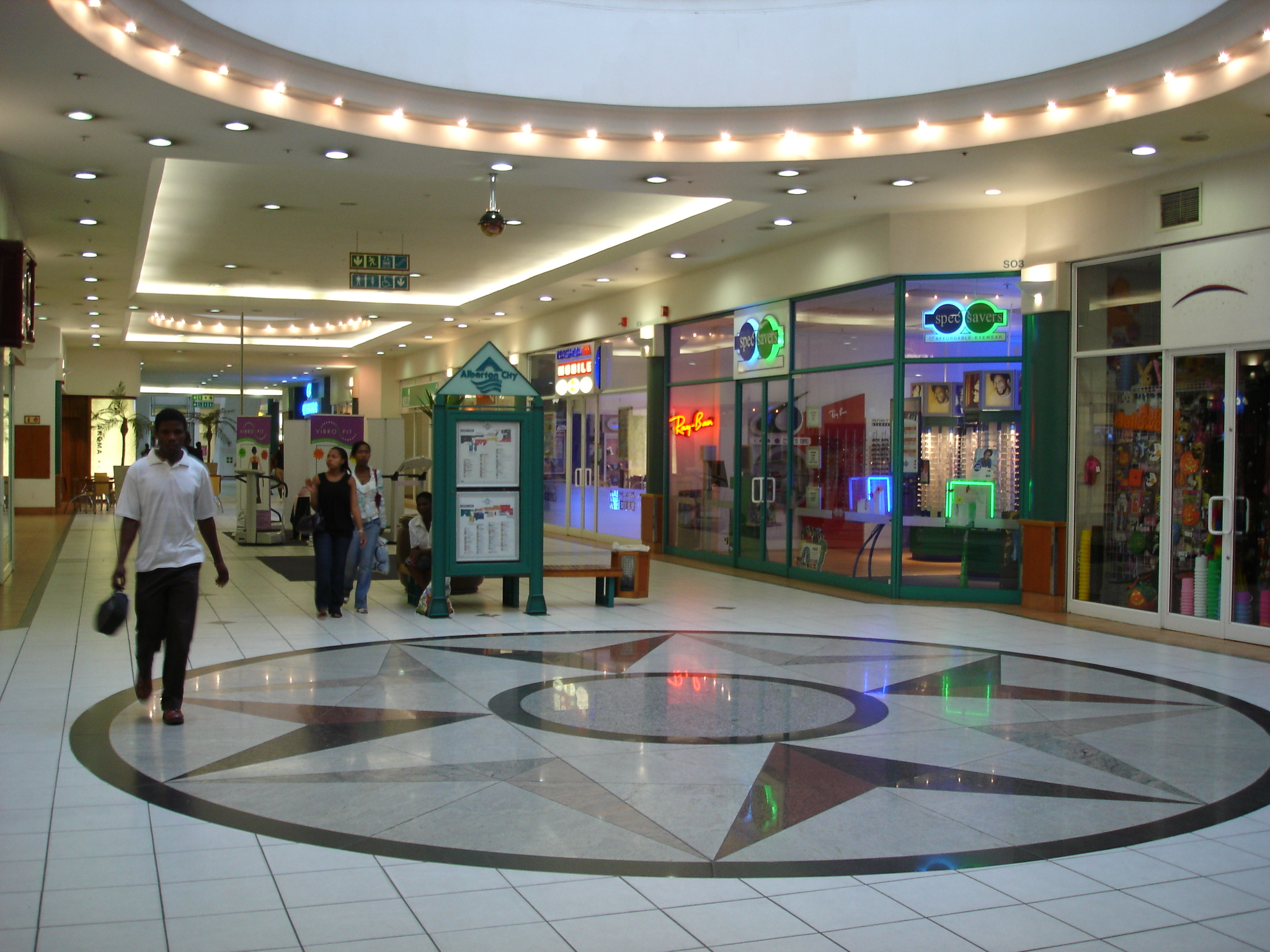
Alberton City shopping centre circa 2010

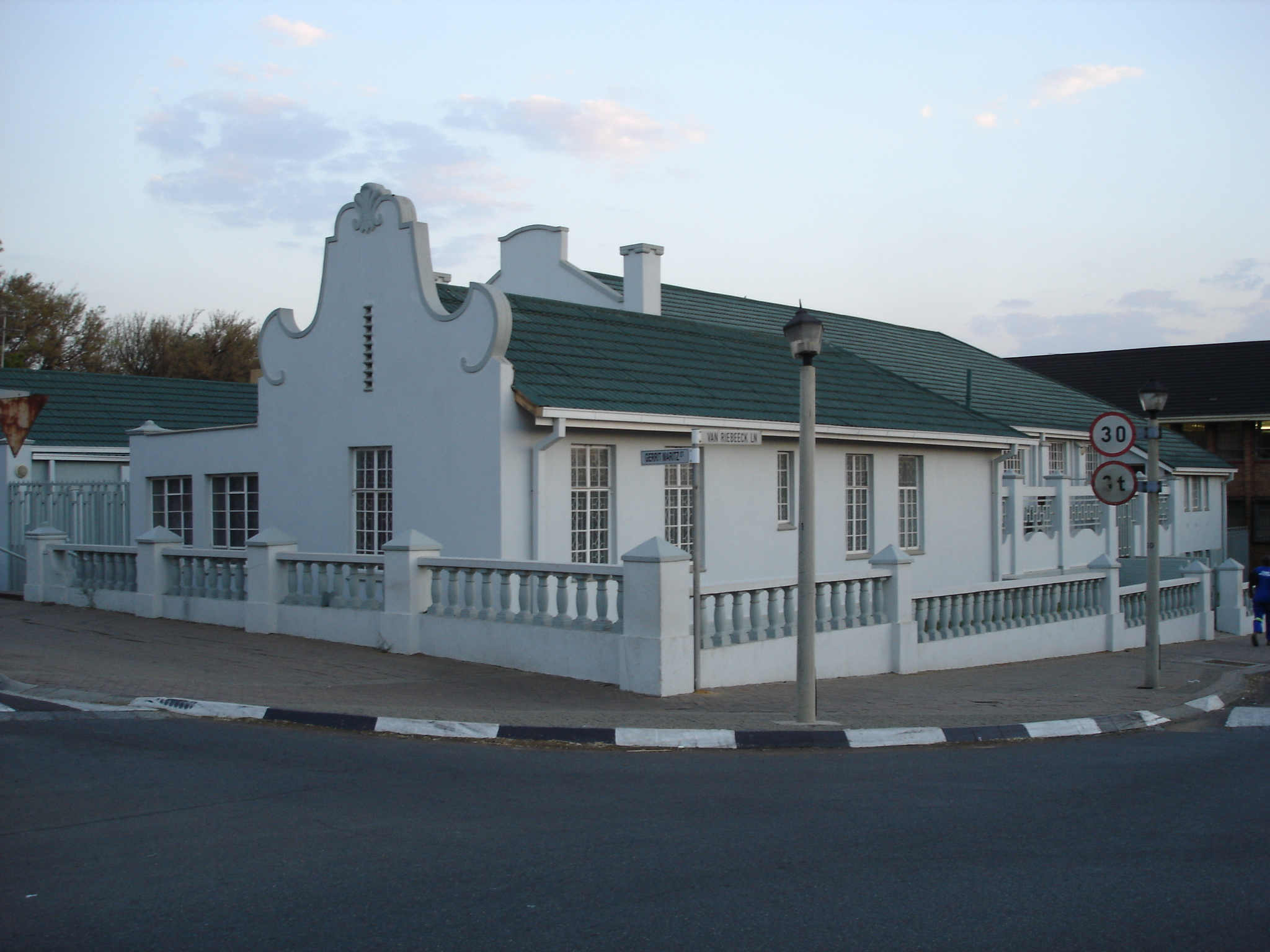
Old town hall

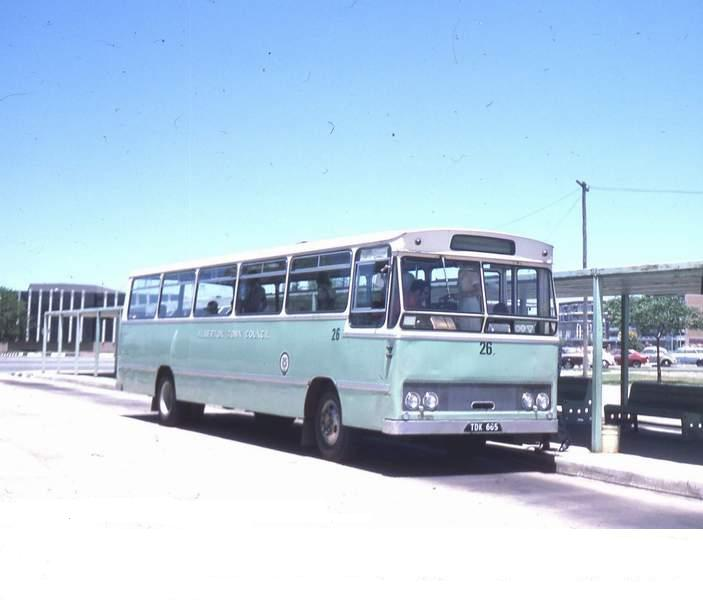
Bus Station circa 1977

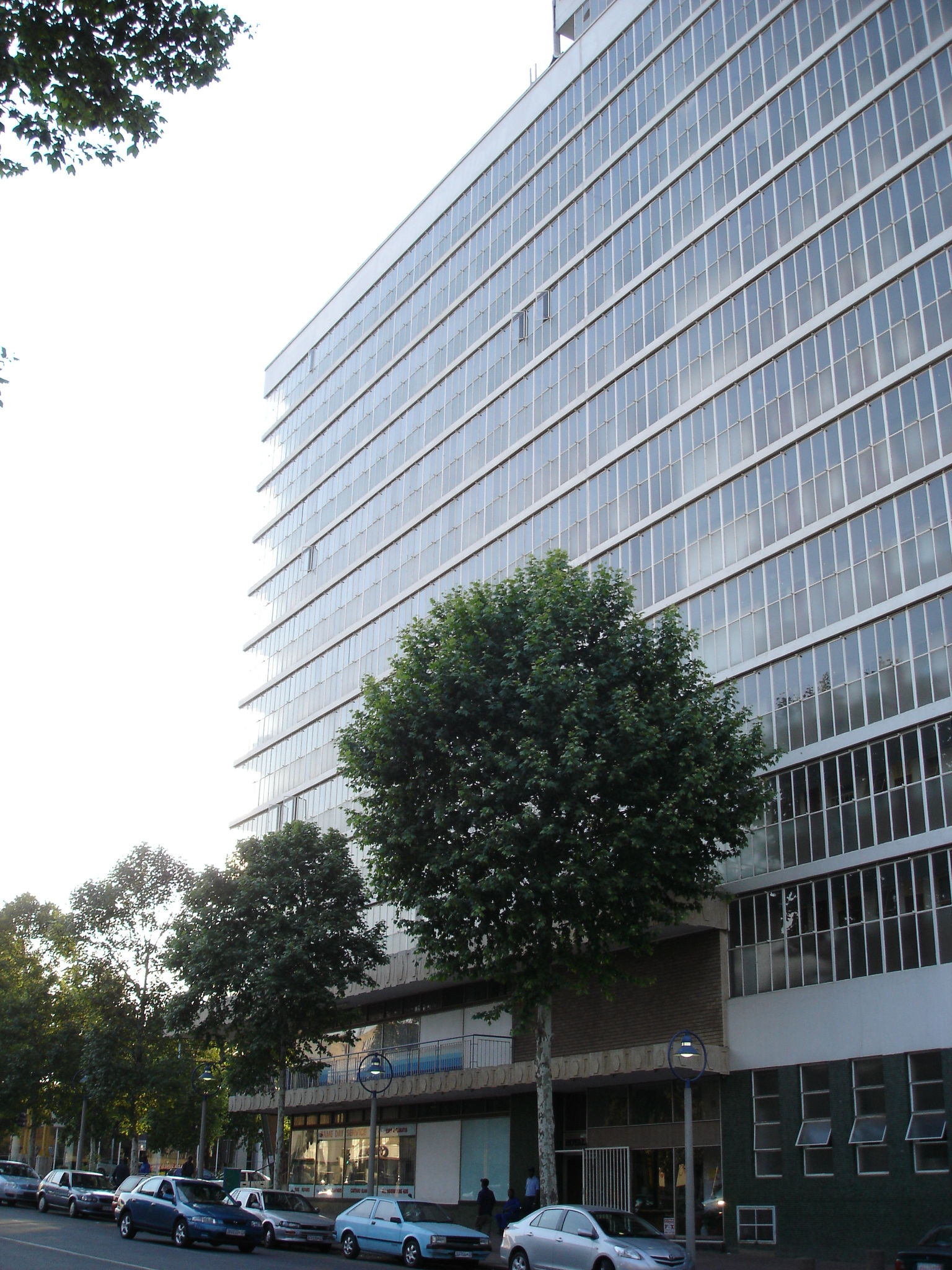
Royal York high-rise

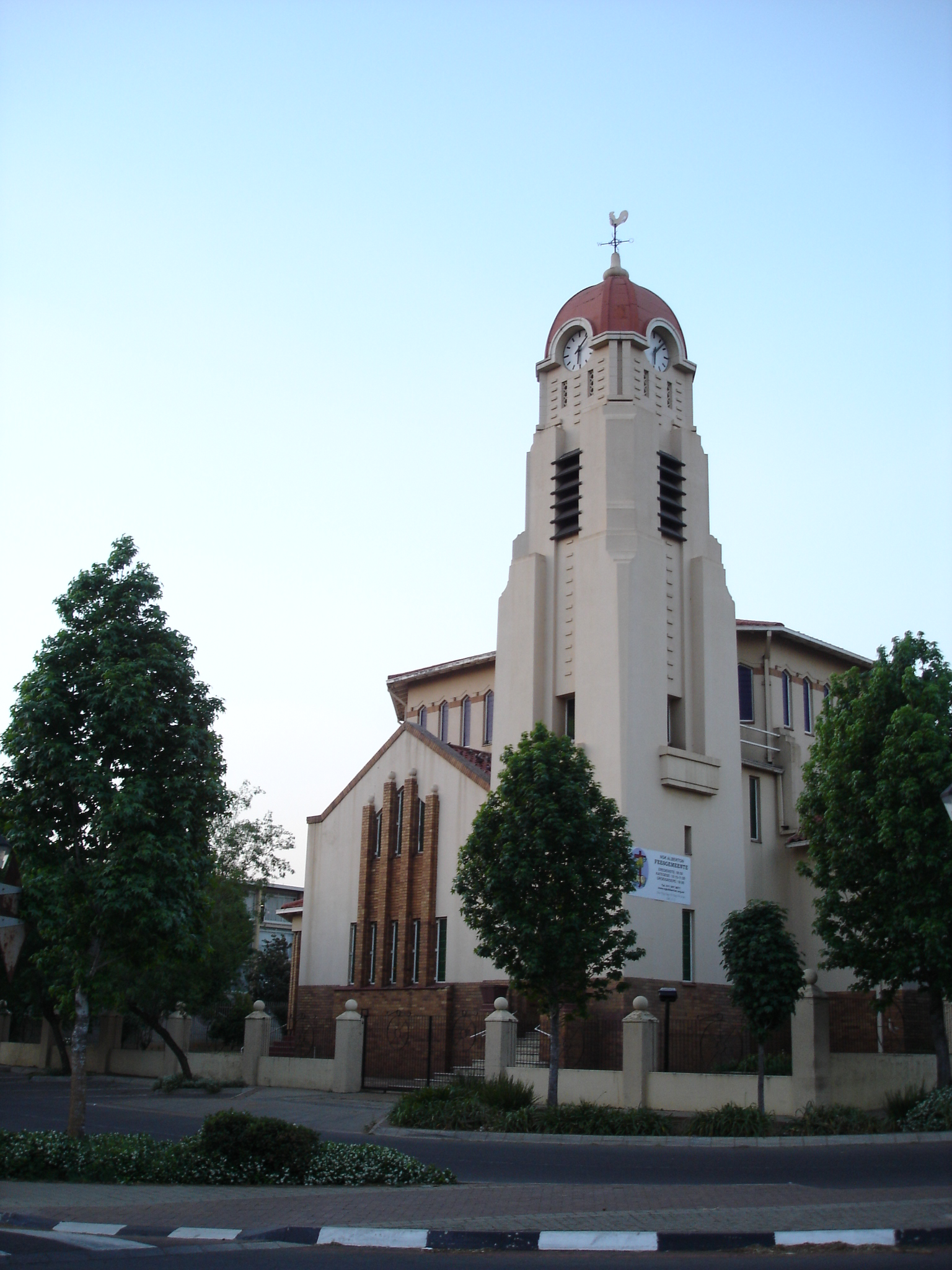
Dutch Reformed Church (Eeufeeskerk)

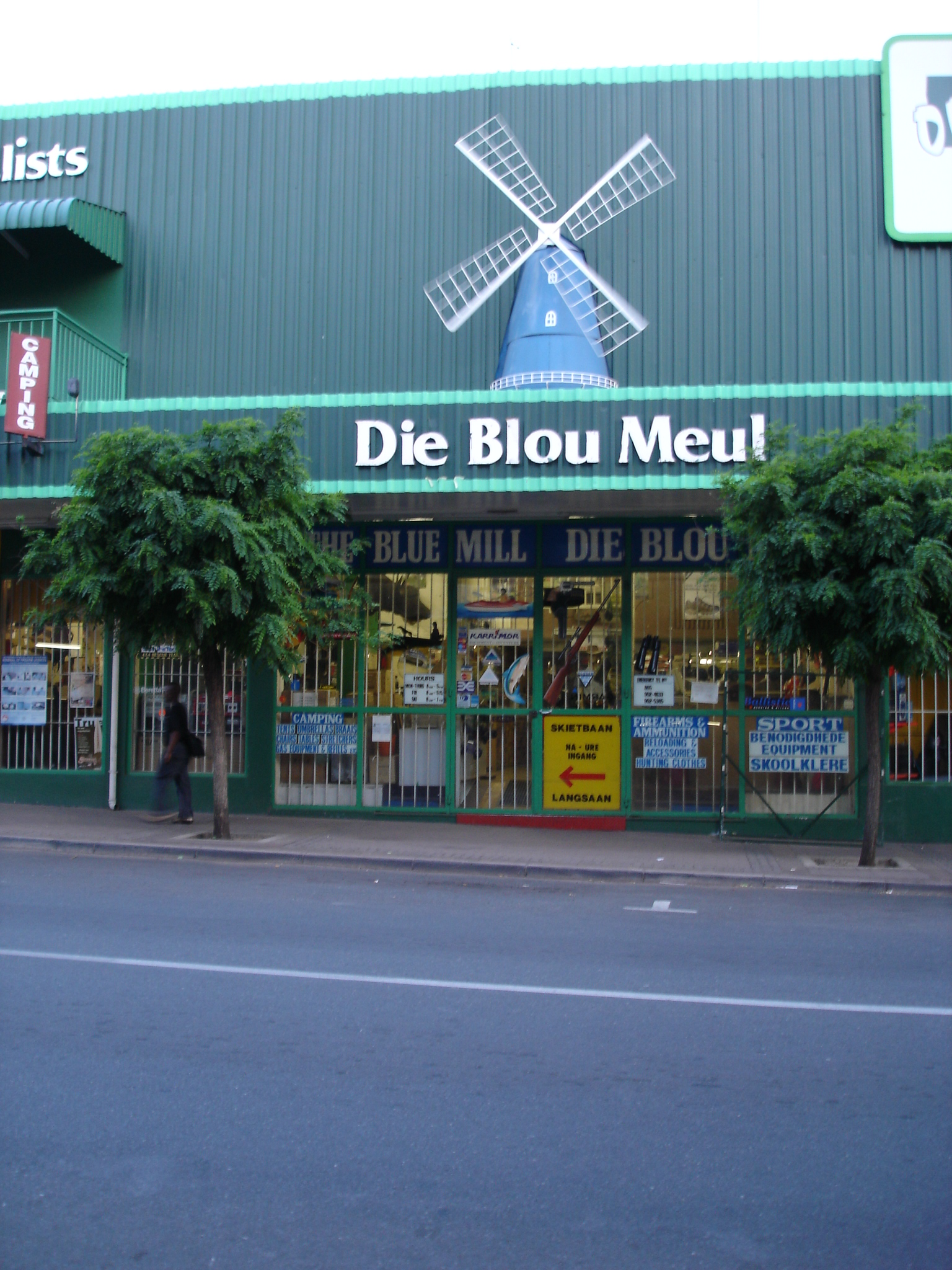
The Blue Mill

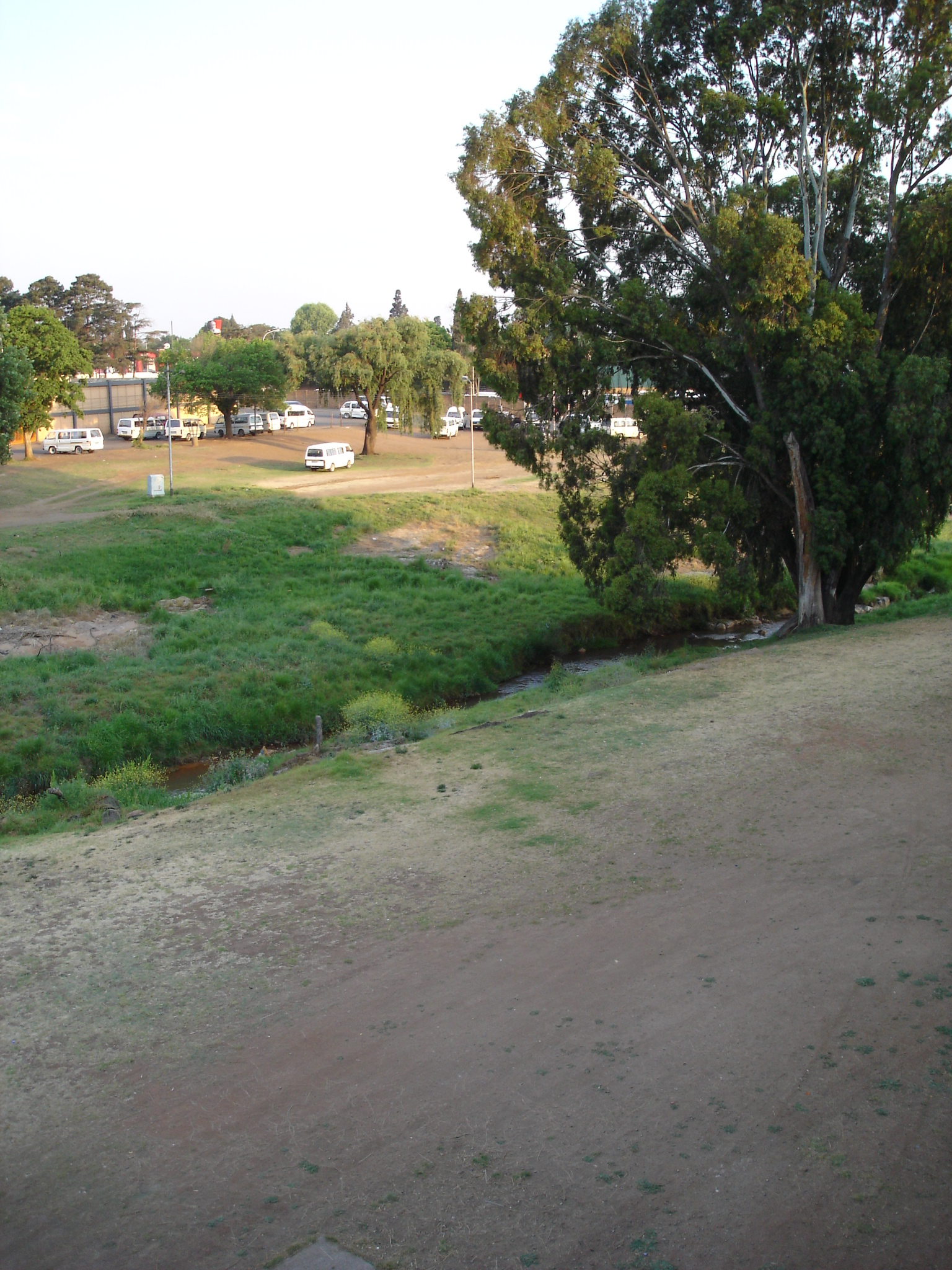
Banks of the Natalspruit

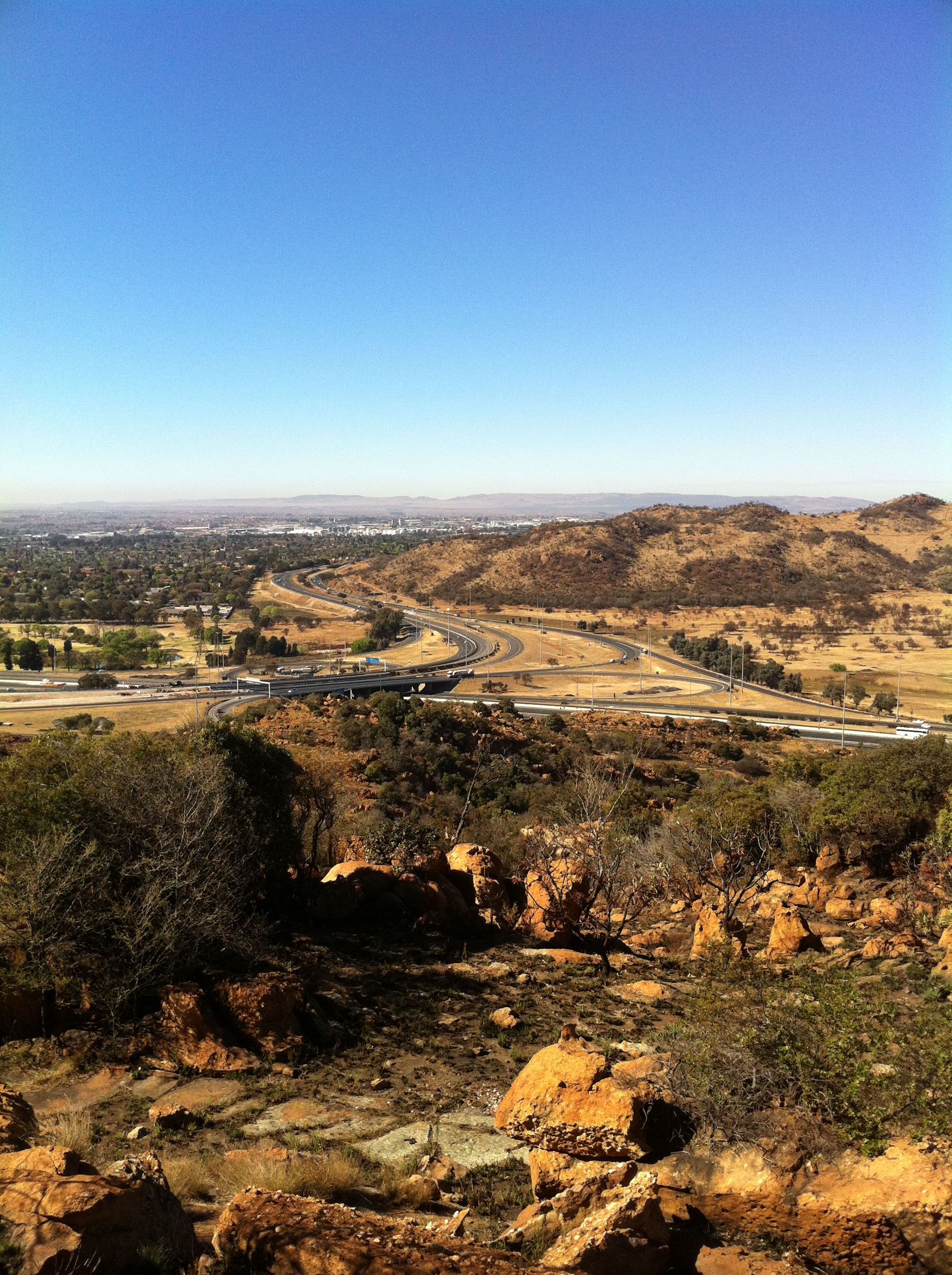
Reading interchange at R59 Sybrand van Niekerk/Southern Bypass

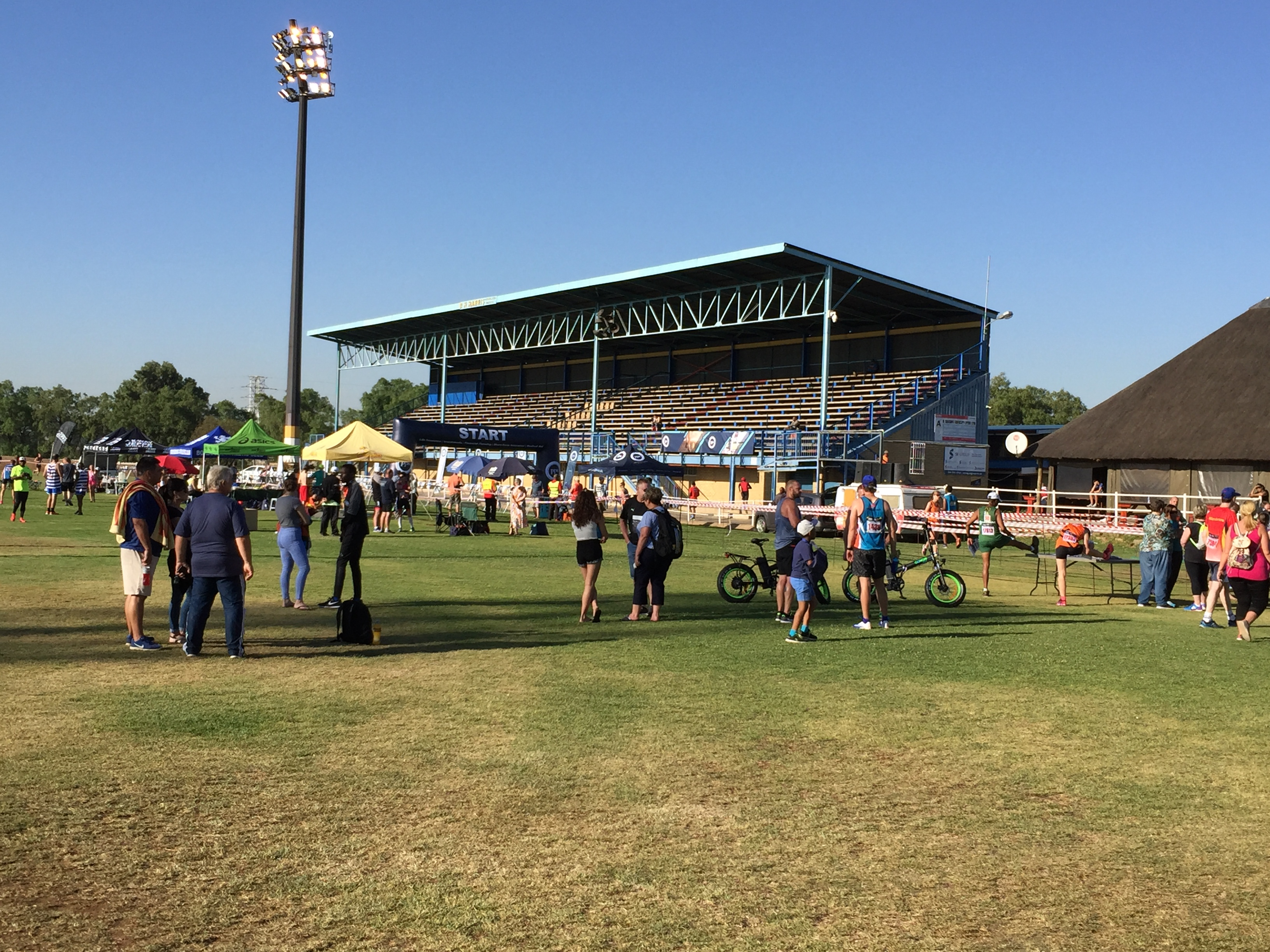
Alberton rugby stadium, 2018
