= Ophirton =

- Location within Gauteng Location within South Africa
- Coordinates: 26.225°S 28.026°E
- Country: South Africa
- Province: Gauteng
- Municipality: City of Johannesburg
- Main Place: Johannesburg

Area
  - Total: 0.94 km^{2} (0.36 sq mi)

Population (2011)
  - Total: 506
  - Density: 540/km^{2} (1,400/sq mi)

Racial makeup (2011)
  - Black African: 67.6%
  - Coloured: 3.4%
  - Indian/Asian: 25.7%
  - White: 1.8%
  - Other: 1.6%

First languages (2011)
  - English: 30.4%
  - Zulu: 19.3%
  - Xhosa: 9.7%
  - Northern Sotho: 7.2%
  - Other: 33.5%
- Time zone: UTC+2 (SAST)
- Postal code (street): 2091

Ophirton is a suburb of Johannesburg, South Africa. This industrial suburb lies three kilometers to south-west of the Johannesburg CBD. It is located in Region F of the City of Johannesburg Metropolitan Municipality, adjacent to Booysens.

== History ==
Ophirton has it origin in 1888, not long after the creation of Johannesburg in 1886. The suburb is situated on part of an old Witwatersrand farm called Turffontein. It is named after the Paarl Ophir Gold Mining Company that owned the land. It has its origins as a dusty residential suburb, that was surrounded by mine dumps, and occupied by the poorer classes. Chandler's Brewery was one of the early industrial business' in the suburb. Nowadays the suburb is mostly industrial but a few old residential houses remain.
