= Noordgesig =

- Location within South Africa Location within Gauteng
- Coordinates: 26.227°S 27.939°E
- Country: South Africa
- Province: Gauteng
- Municipality: City of Johannesburg
- Main Place: Soweto

Area
  - Total: 1.28 km^{2} (0.49 sq mi)

Population (2011)
  - Total: 12,115
  - Density: 9,460/km^{2} (24,500/sq mi)

Racial makeup (2011)
  - Black African: 43.33%
  - Coloured: 54.92%
  - Indian/Asian: 0.54%
  - White: 0.90%
  - Other: 0.31%

First languages (2011)
  - Afrikaans: 55.05%
  - English: 12.93%
  - Zulu: 8.59%
  - Xhosa: 6.17%
  - Other: 17.26%
- Time zone: UTC+2 (SAST)
- Postal code (street): 1804

Noordgesig (meaning "north view/facing") is a township in Soweto, situated at the edge of area's northernmost boundary, but within its territory. It is the first township seen on entering Soweto from the frequently used New Canada Road. Noordgesig is a Coloured township. It is colloquially called "Bulte"(meaning Hills) by its residence and neighbors, as depicted by the Mine Dumps surrounding the Township. The name "Bulte" was coined as a form of endearment by the residence for the longest time.

== History ==
The township is one of the oldest "Coloured" townships and one of multiple locations that make up greater Soweto. However, this is difficult to discern from historical works, which, if they mention Noordgesig at all, only name it, and predominantly focus on the establishment of Orlando in the mid-1930s, and then later in the 1950s, the construction of Meadowlands and Diepkloof, or the uprising of June 16, 1976. The historical analysis of Soweto largely ignores Noordgesig. Noordgesig was not administered as part of greater Orlando until after the end of apartheid, and is therefore not distinguished from it, which consequently might offer a reason why histories of Soweto never include its establishment in their analysis. Because it was established for coloured occupation, government documents relating to Noordgesig are filed in the various departments dealing with coloured affairs and not those of Orlando or Soweto. Accordingly, a study of this township fills in this absence in historical literature.

Noordgesig Township is one of the original townships established on the farms Diepkloof and Klipspruit purchased by the Johannesburg City Council (JCC) during the 1930s, which would only in 1963, become collectively known as Soweto. Township areas in the southwestern areas of Johannesburg established prior to the apartheid era include Kliptown in 1904, Orlando East 1932, Pimville 1934, and Noordgesig 1940/41. The layout of Noordgesig was approved by the JCC as early as 23 March 1937. Therefore, the history of this township must be included not only in writing any history tracing the origins of the south western areas of Johannesburg just prior to World War II (WWII), but also in studies of early black township formations on the Witwatersrand.

Building black housing became a priority for the JCC, the Transvaal provincial government, and the Union government, especially from the late 1930s through the end of the 1940s. However, the war hindered housing construction efforts. The significant increase in urban migration into cities, particularly those on the Witwatersrand, due to the growth in manufacturing industries and job opportunities before and during World War II, led to a shortage of accommodation for new arrivals. Squatter camps became common during the early to mid-1940s and spread rapidly throughout what today is Orlando West and Moroka townships in Soweto. By the end of the 1940s the National Party (NP) government was faced with the challenge, greater than before, of trying to house these people. Motivated by the Group Areas Act of 1950, large numbers of people were displaced and forcibly removed from urban areas resulting in an unprecedented growth in new townships allocated in Soweto by the state.

The coloured population is small compared to the black population of South Africa and one reason why fewer studies on coloured housing in the urban history of Johannesburg exist. Contextualizing a historically coloured township requires an analysis of this identity. Noordgesig, can be understood as a locality made up of people, present and in the past, who in the majority are considered coloured, whether self-ascribed, or imposed, by virtue of their race, identity, class and complex relationship to ‘black’ Soweto.
