= Townsview =

- Location within Gauteng Location within South Africa
- Coordinates: 26.259°S 28.051°E
- Country: South Africa
- Province: Gauteng
- Municipality: City of Johannesburg
- Main Place: Johannesburg

Area
  - Total: 0.37 km^{2} (0.14 sq mi)

Population (2011)
  - Total: 1,096
  - Density: 3,000/km^{2} (7,700/sq mi)

Racial makeup (2011)
  - Black African: 51.8%
  - Coloured: 12.6%
  - Indian/Asian: 0.9%
  - White: 34.7%

First languages (2011)
  - English: 48.7%
  - Afrikaans: 14.8%
  - Zulu: 10.5%
  - Xhosa: 5.6%
  - Other: 20.5%
- Time zone: UTC+2 (SAST)
- Postal code (street): 2190

Townsview is a suburb of Johannesburg, South Africa. It is located in Region F of the City of Johannesburg Metropolitan Municipality.
