= Selby, Johannesburg =

Selby
- Location within Gauteng Location within South Africa
- Coordinates: 26.217°S 28.031°E
- Country: South Africa
- Province: Gauteng
- Municipality: City of Johannesburg
- Main Place: Johannesburg
- Established: 1928

Area
  - Total: 3.69 km^{2} (1.42 sq mi)

Population (2011)
  - Total: 3,323
  - Density: 901/km^{2} (2,330/sq mi)

Racial makeup (2011)
  - Black African: 96.8%
  - Coloured: 1.5%
  - Indian/Asian: 0.5%
  - White: 0.9%
  - Other: 0.3%

First languages (2011)
  - Zulu: 31.0%
  - Xhosa: 10.2%
  - English: 8.5%
  - Southern Ndebele: 6.7%
  - Other: 43.6%
- Time zone: UTC+2 (SAST)
- Postal code (street): 2001

Selby is a suburb of Johannesburg, South Africa. It is located in Region F of the City of Johannesburg Metropolitan Municipality.

== History ==
Prior to the discovery of gold on the Witwatersrand in 1886, the suburb lay on land on one of the original farms called Turffontein. The area was originally mining land on which two mine's, Village Main and Ferreira Gold, were established. It was established as a suburb in 1928 and is named after mine manager Paul Selby of Ferreira Deep.
