= Southgate, South Africa =

Southgate
- Location within Gauteng Location within South Africa
- Coordinates: 26.263°S 27.978°E
- Country: South Africa
- Province: Gauteng
- Municipality: City of Johannesburg
- Main Place: Johannesburg

Area
  - Total: 0.64 km^{2} (0.25 sq mi)

Population (2011)
  - Total: 0
  - Density: 0.0/km^{2} (0.0/sq mi)
- Time zone: UTC+2 (SAST)
- Postal code (street): 4068
- PO box: 4157

Southgate is a suburb south of Johannesburg, South Africa. It is located in Region F of the City of Johannesburg Metropolitan Municipality, just west of Mondeor. It is a small area of residency and is more known for its shopping mall (Southgate Shopping Centre).
