= Southgate Shopping Centre =

- Location: Columbine Avenue, Southgate, Johannesburg, South Africa
- Coordinates: 26°16′04″S 27°58′46″E
- Website: www.southgatemall.co.za

Southgate Shopping Centre is a large shopping centre in Johannesburg, South Africa. It is located in Southgate (just west of Mondeor) and is one of the ten largest shopping centres in South Africa, with over 160 commercial tenants. The centre has long served the nearby township of Soweto. It was opened in late 1990.
