= Southdale, Johannesburg =

Southdale
- Location within Gauteng Location within South Africa
- Coordinates: 26.240°S 28.022°E
- Country: South Africa
- Province: Gauteng
- Municipality: City of Johannesburg
- Main Place: Johannesburg
- Established: 1964

Area
  - Total: 0.38 km^{2} (0.15 sq mi)

Population (2011)
  - Total: 647
  - Density: 1,700/km^{2} (4,400/sq mi)

Racial makeup (2011)
  - Black African: 31.9%
  - Coloured: 9.1%
  - Indian/Asian: 21.5%
  - White: 27.8%
  - Other: 9.7%

First languages (2011)
  - English: 54.8%
  - Afrikaans: 13.5%
  - Zulu: 6.7%
  - Sotho: 4.0%
  - Other: 21.1%
- Time zone: UTC+2 (SAST)
- Postal code (street): 2091
- PO box: 2135

Southdale is a suburb of Johannesburg, South Africa. It is located in Region F of the City of Johannesburg Metropolitan Municipality.

== History ==
Prior to the discovery of gold on the Witwatersrand in 1886, the suburb lay on land on one of the original farms called Turffontein. It became a suburb on 8 July 1964.
