= Winchester Hills =

- Location within Gauteng Location within South Africa
- Coordinates: 26.268°S 28.017°E
- Country: South Africa
- Province: Gauteng
- Municipality: City of Johannesburg
- Main Place: Johannesburg

Area
  - Total: 2.80 km^{2} (1.08 sq mi)

Population (2011)
  - Total: 9,207
  - Density: 3,290/km^{2} (8,520/sq mi)

Racial makeup (2011)
  - Black African: 47.37%
  - Coloured: 9.36%
  - Indian/Asian: 24.6%
  - White: 15.97%
  - Other: 2.69%

First languages (2011)
  - English: 54.35%
  - Zulu: 10.19%
  - Afrikaans: 7.58%
  - Northern Sotho: 5.8%
  - Tswana: 5.25%
- Time zone: UTC+2 (SAST)
- Postal code (street): 2091

Winchester Hills is an area in Johannesburg, South Africa. Houses for sale in the region often sell for more than R 750,000.

== History ==
Winchester Hills lies on land that once made up the farm called Ormonde, one of many large farms that make what is Johannesburg and its suburbs. It is named after Winchester, Hampshire in the United Kingdom and the elevated land that the suburb lies upon.

The anti-corruption whistleblower Babita Deokaran was murdered outside of her Winchester Hills home in August 2021.
