= Klipriviersberg =

- Location within Gauteng Location within South Africa
- Coordinates: 26.241°S 28.077°E
- Country: South Africa
- Province: Gauteng
- Municipality: City of Johannesburg
- Established: 1943

Area
  - Total: 0.15 km^{2} (0.058 sq mi)

Population (2001)
  - Total: 442
  - Density: 2,900/km^{2} (7,600/sq mi)
- Time zone: UTC+2 (SAST)

Klipriviersberg is a suburb of Johannesburg, South Africa. It is located in Region F of the City of Johannesburg Metropolitan Municipality.

== History ==
Prior to the discovery of gold on the Witwatersrand in 1886, the suburb lay on land on one of the original farms called Klipriviersberg. It was established on part of the farm own by Jan Meyer, a member of the South African Republic's Volksraad and became a suburb 29 June 1943.

== Nature Reserve ==
Currently known as the Klipriviersberg Nature Reserve, the area contains several hiking routes along a stream that lead up to natural rock pools in which swimming is allowed.
