= Mondeor =

Suburb of Johannesburg, South Africa

- Location within Gauteng Location within South Africa
- Coordinates: 26.271°S 27.998°E
- Country: South Africa
- Province: Gauteng
- Municipality: City of Johannesburg
- Main Place: Johannesburg
- Established: 1958

Area
  - Total: 3.71 km^{2} (1.43 sq mi)

Population (2011)
  - Total: 8,021
  - Density: 2,160/km^{2} (5,600/sq mi)

Racial makeup (2011)
  - Black African: 45.1%
  - Coloured: 16.4%
  - Indian/Asian: 13.5%
  - White: 23.3%
  - Other: 1.8%

First languages (2011)
  - English: 51.4%
  - Zulu: 12.6%
  - Afrikaans: 10.4%
  - Sotho: 6.9%
  - Other: 18.7%
- Time zone: UTC+2 (SAST)
- Postal code (street): 2091
- PO box: 2110

Mondeor is a suburb of Johannesburg, South Africa. It is located in Region F of the City of Johannesburg Metropolitan Municipality. Known as the Jewel of the South, Mondeor is set amongst hills outside the urban Johannesburg area but is only a 15-minute drive from the city centre.

== History ==
The suburb is situated on part of an old Witwatersrand farm called Ormonde. It was established in 1958 and its name is an anagram of the old name of the farm.

=== Parks and green space ===
Parts of the Klipriviersberg Nature Reserve are in Mondeor. The hills lying on the northern side of Mondeor are of sandstone, and those on the south are igneous.

== Education ==
Mondeor currently has four schools: Mondeor Primary, Dalmondeor, Mondeor High School, and Hartford College. Mondeor Primary School first opened in 1953. The initial school building was one converted log cabin at the site of the current tennis club. The school moved to its current location in 1955.

Mondeor High School opened in 1974. At the time there were three class years, standards 6, 7 and 8. An additional standard was added each year thereafter until the first class of Matriculation in 1976.

=== Popular culture ===
Parts of the 2010 novel Happiness is a Four-Letter Word (2010) are set in Mondeor.
