= Diepkloof =

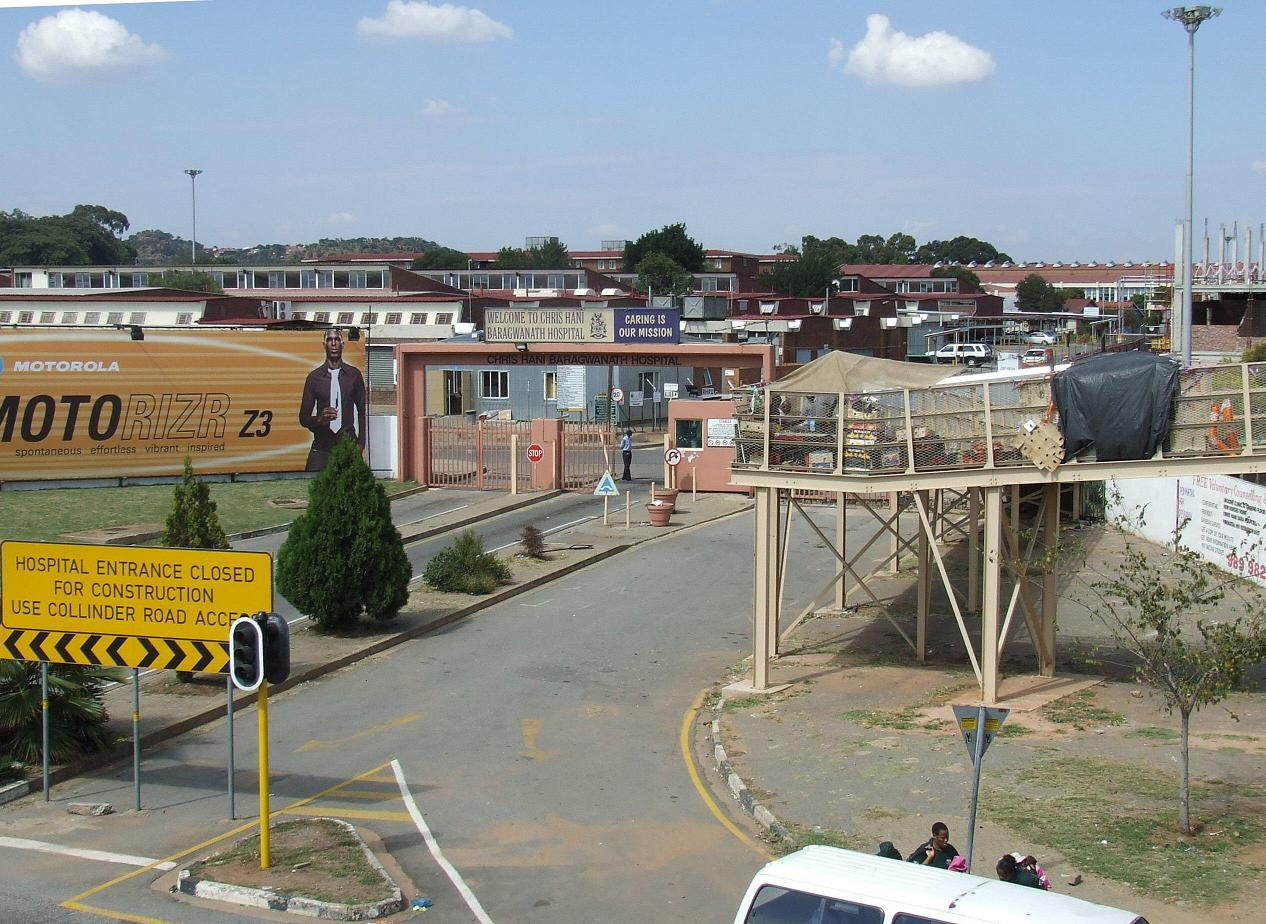
- Chris Hani Baragwanath Hospital in Diepkloof

- Location within Gauteng Location within South Africa
- Coordinates: 26.249°S 27.946°E
- Country: South Africa
- Province: Gauteng
- Municipality: City of Johannesburg
- Main Place: Soweto

Area
  - Total: 9.46 km^{2} (3.65 sq mi)

Population (2011)
  - Total: 95,067
  - Density: 10,000/km^{2} (26,000/sq mi)

Racial makeup (2011)
  - Black African: 99.7%
  - Coloured: 0.2%
  - White: 0.1%

First languages (2011)
  - Zulu: 34.3%
  - Tswana: 14.6%
  - Sotho: 12.8%
  - Tsonga: 12.4%
  - Other: 25.9%
- Time zone: UTC+2 (SAST)
- Postal code (street): 1862
- PO box: 1864

Diepkloof is a large section of the Soweto township in the Gauteng province, South Africa. It is sometimes informally called Diepmeadow when considered together with the nearby Meadowlands, despite Orlando lying between them. Diepkloof was established in 1959 to accommodate people displaced from Alexandra during apartheid-era forced removals.
