= Suideroord =

- Location within Gauteng Location within South Africa
- Coordinates: 26.272°S 28.028°E
- Country: South Africa
- Province: Gauteng
- Municipality: City of Johannesburg
- Main Place: Johannesburg

Area
  - Total: 1.41 km^{2} (0.54 sq mi)

Population (2011)
  - Total: 3,556
  - Density: 2,520/km^{2} (6,530/sq mi)

Racial makeup (2011)
  - Black African: 33.3%
  - Coloured: 11.8%
  - Indian/Asian: 17.2%
  - White: 35.2%
  - Other: 2.5%

First languages (2011)
  - English: 57.0%
  - Afrikaans: 13.6%
  - Zulu: 10.0%
  - Sotho: 5.1%
  - Other: 14.2%
- Time zone: UTC+2 (SAST)
- Postal code (street): 2091

Suideroord is a suburb of Johannesburg, South Africa. It is located in Region F of the City of Johannesburg Metropolitan Municipality.

The suburb is divided into two areas, namely Suideroord North and Suideroord South.

The Suideroord South Community Forum was established to manage and assist with community initiatives. Most notably the neighbourhood security patrols and the fencing project which aims to fence off the open stretch of land between Potgieter Road and Kliprivier Road.

The area houses a Memorial with graves of women and children who died at the Turffontein Concentration Camp during the South African Anglo-Boer War, 1899 to 1902.
