= M95 (Johannesburg) =

Metropolitan route in the City of Johannesburg, South Africa

Metropolitan route M95

Route information
- Maintained by Johannesburg Roads Agency and Gauteng Department of Roads and Transport

Major junctions
- East end: M7
- West end: R554

Location
- Country: South Africa

Highway system
- Numbered routes of South Africa
← M94	→ M96

The M95 is a short metropolitan route in the Greater Johannesburg metropolitan area, South Africa.

== Route ==
The M95 begins at the M7 and ends at the R554.
