= Mulbarton, Johannesburg =

Mulbarton
- Location within Gauteng Location within South Africa
- Coordinates: 26.290414°S 28.049297°E
- Country: South Africa
- Province: Gauteng
- Municipality: City of Johannesburg
- Main Place: Johannesburg

Area
  - Total: 2.77 km^{2} (1.07 sq mi)

Population (2011)
  - Total: 6,645
  - Density: 2,400/km^{2} (6,210/sq mi)

Racial makeup (2011)
  - Black African: 26.7%
  - Coloured: 4.9%
  - Indian/Asian: 13.4%
  - White: 52.1%
  - Other: 2.9%

First languages (2011)
  - English: 64.6%
  - Afrikaans: 12.4%
  - Zulu: 6.6%
  - Sotho: 4.4%
  - Other: 12.1%
- Time zone: UTC+2 (SAST)
- Postal code (street): 2190
- PO box: 2059

Mulbarton is a suburb that is located in the South of Johannesburg, Gauteng, South Africa. It is located in Region F of the City of Johannesburg Metropolitan Municipality.

It is a scenic residential area with mainly middle-to-higher income residents. The houses are medium to large in size with many hills and open terrain areas. The main road that runs through Mulbarton is True North road. Along this road you will find Mulbarton Shopping Centre and Mulbarton private hospital. Two other shopping centres are located along The Broads. Education-wise there is Mulbarton Primary; Christian Harvest; Mulbarton Remedial and Glenvista High School. Even though the name of the high school is Glenvista it is technically located in Mulbarton.

Building in the suburb of Mulbarton began in 1974; although water and electricity were almost immediately connected, telephone lines were not installed until 1977. Roads were left untarred until 1978/9, after which streetlights followed. The Panorama Drive-In was the only source of movies in this suburb and surrounding ones for many years. The location of this drive-in still exists; however the screen has been removed and a popular flea market now uses it on weekends and holidays. Adjacent to the flea market a mall, the Panorama Shopping Centre, recently opened for business.

All the streets in Mulbarton, including ones such as The Broads, Dereham Drive and King's Lynn are named after places in the English county of Norfolk.

The Maronite Catholic Church in Mulbarton is home to one of two statues of Our Lady of Lebanon.

== Community Forum ==
The community forum was established in November 2008 by Bruce Strachan. The main goal of the forum is to reduce crime in the area as well as improve on other aspects such as service delivery by the municipality.
