= Glenvista =

- Location within Gauteng Location within South Africa
- Coordinates: 26°16′53″S 28°2′50″E
- Country: South Africa
- Province: Gauteng
- Municipality: City of Johannesburg
- Main Place: Johannesburg

Area
  - Total: 5.36 km^{2} (2.07 sq mi)

Population (2011)
  - Total: 10,177
  - Density: 1,900/km^{2} (4,920/sq mi)

Racial makeup (2011)
  - Black African: 22.8%
  - Coloured: 4.4%
  - Indian/Asian: 11.0%
  - White: 60.3%
  - Other: 1.6%

First languages (2011)
  - English: 67.1%
  - Afrikaans: 13.5%
  - Zulu: 5.3%
  - Sotho: 3.3%
  - Other: 10.8%
- Time zone: UTC+2 (SAST)
- Postal code (street): 2091
- PO box: 2058

Glenvista is an affluent suburb in the south of Johannesburg, South Africa. It is located in Region F of the City of Johannesburg Metropolitan Municipality. It has a large Portuguese community and a distinctly cosmopolitan character. Glenvista is 5 kilometres west of Alberton.

== Scenery ==
Glenvista is subtantially greener than most of Johannesburg and it is located near the Klipriviersberg Nature Reserve. It is home to the Glenvista Country Club's 18-hole, 72 par golf course. The suburb also contains many mansions and expansive properties.

== Facilities ==
In extension 5, there is a 72 par golf course in the dip of a valley, 'The Glenvista Country Club'. The houses and properties can be large, and land value is high in the surrounding area. The neighbourhood is generally considered safe. It is situated close to a major shopping centre, The Glen and Mall of the South.

== Schools ==
There are seven schools located in Glenvista.

- Glenvista High School
- Glenvista Primary
- Little Owls Montessori Nursery School
- Comaro Valley Nursery School
- Glenanda Primary School
- Mulbarton Primary School Fees
- Harvest Christian School
- Malusi Primary School T/A St Anthony's College
