= United Nations Security Council Resolution 930 =

UN Security Council Resolution 930
- South Africa
- Date: 27 June 1994
- Meeting no.: 3,393
- Code: S/RES/930 (Document)
- Subject: South Africa
- Voting summary: 15 voted for; None voted against; None abstained
- Result: Adopted

Security Council composition
- Permanent members: China; France; Russia; United Kingdom; United States
- Non-permanent members: Argentina; Brazil; Czech Republic; Djibouti; New Zealand; Nigeria; Oman; Pakistan; Rwanda; Spain

United Nations Security Council resolution 930, adopted unanimously on 27 June 1994, after recalling resolutions 772 (1992) and 894 (1994), the Council noted with satisfaction that a democratic and non-racial government had been established in South Africa, and terminated the United Nations Observer Mission in South Africa (UNOMSA).

The efforts of the Special Representative of the Secretary-General Boutros Boutros-Ghali and UNOMSA, together with the Organisation of African Unity, Commonwealth of Nations and the European Union were commended. Finally, the Council decided to remove the item titled "The question of South Africa" from the matters of which it was seized. International sanctions on the country were lifted in Resolution 919.

== See also ==
- List of United Nations Security Council Resolutions 901 to 1000 (1994–1995)
- Negotiations to end apartheid in South Africa
- South African general election, 1994
- South Africa under apartheid
