= United Nations Security Council Resolution 610 =

UN Security Council Resolution 610
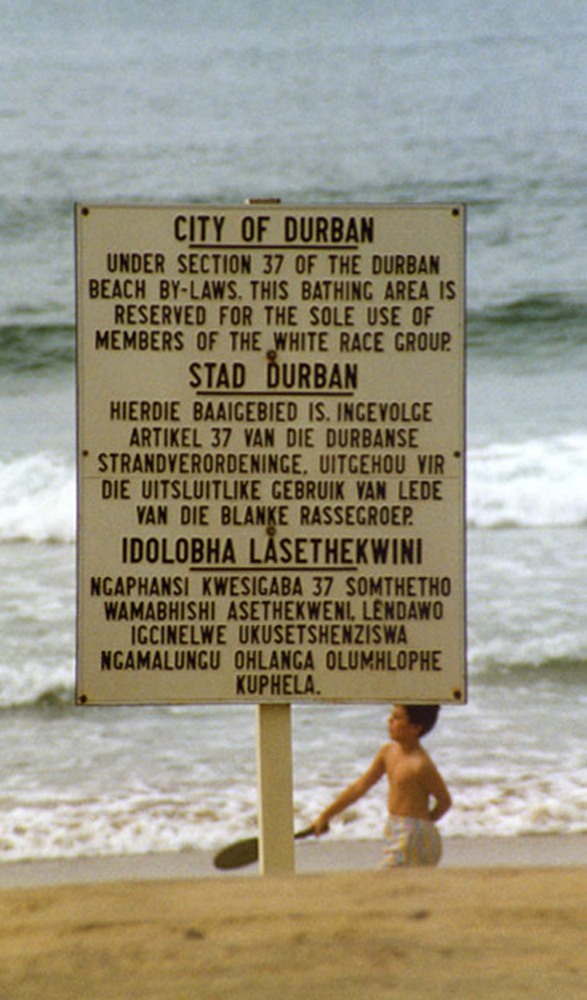
- Apartheid-era sign (1989)
- Date: 16 March 1988
- Meeting no.: 2,799
- Code: S/RES/610 (Document)
- Subject: South Africa
- Voting summary: 15 voted for; None voted against; None abstained
- Result: Adopted

Security Council composition
- Permanent members: China; France; Soviet Union; United Kingdom; United States
- Non-permanent members: Algeria; Argentina; Brazil; Italy; Japan; Nepal; Senegal; West Germany; Yugoslavia; Zambia

United Nations Security Council resolution 610, adopted unanimously on 16 March 1988, after reaffirming resolutions 503 (1982), 525 (1982), 533 (1983) and 547 (1984) expressing concern at the imposed death sentences of anti-apartheid activists, the Council noted the deteriorating situation in South Africa. Resolution 610 concerned the Sharpeville Six, accused of the murder of the Deputy Mayor of Sharpeville on 12 December 1985.

The resolution expressed deep concern at the decision of the "Pretoria regime" to execute the Sharpeville Six on 18 March 1988 despite worldwide appeal, noting that the court proceedings showed that none of the six suspects was found to have killed the Councillor, but all were only convicted as they had a "common purpose" with the actual perpetrators.

Resolution 610 urged the Government of South Africa to commute the sentences and stay execution, urging other Member States, acting in accordance with the United Nations Charter, to save the lives of the six people. The following day after the resolution was adopted, a one-month stay of execution was granted by a South African Court, and the six appealed.

== See also ==
- Internal resistance to apartheid
- List of United Nations Security Council Resolutions 601 to 700 (1987–1991)
- Apartheid
- United Nations Security Council Resolution 615
