= United Nations Security Council Resolution 615 =

UN Security Council Resolution 615
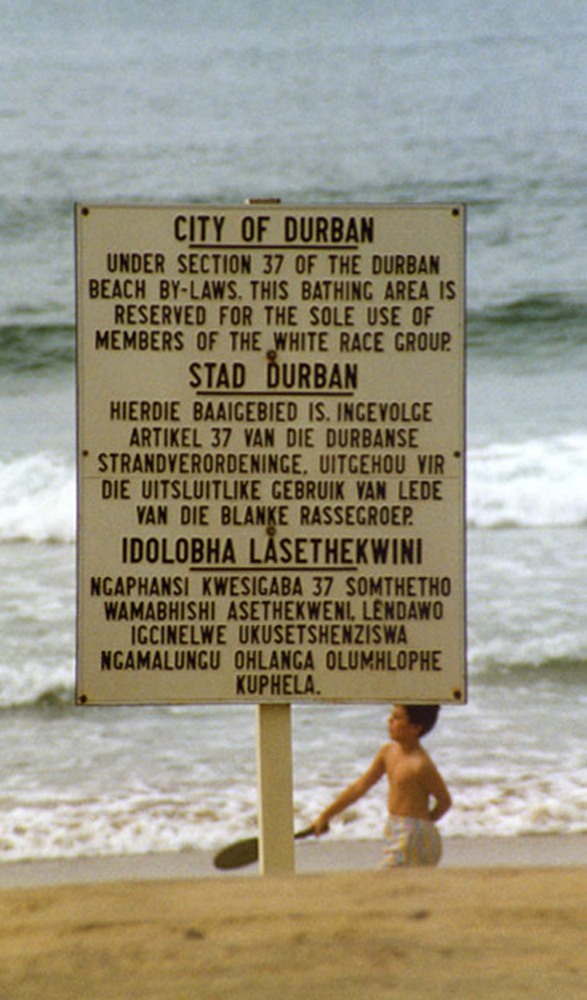
- Apartheid-era sign (1989)
- Date: 17 June 1988
- Meeting no.: 2,817
- Code: S/RES/615 (Document)
- Subject: South Africa
- Voting summary: 15 voted for; None voted against; None abstained
- Result: Adopted

Security Council composition
- Permanent members: China; France; Soviet Union; United Kingdom; United States
- Non-permanent members: Algeria; Argentina; Brazil; Italy; Japan; Nepal; Senegal; West Germany; Yugoslavia; Zambia

In United Nations Security Council resolution 615, adopted unanimously on 17 June 1988, after reaffirming resolutions 503 (1982), 525 (1982), 533 (1983), 547 (1984) and 610 (1988) expressing concern at the imposed death sentences of anti-apartheid activists, the Council noted the deteriorating situation in South Africa.

The resolution expressed deep concern at the restrictions on eighteen anti-apartheid activists and organisations, as well as the detention of church leaders on 29 February 1988, all of which it said "undermined the possibilities of a peaceful resolution of the South African situation".

Regarding the Sharpeville Six, the Council expressed its concern at the rejection of an appeal by them and a refusal to reopen the case at the Pretoria Supreme Court on 13 June 1988. The resolution called on the Government of South Africa to commute the death sentences of the six people, imposed in defiance of world opinion the Council said, urging other Member States to use their influence to pressure South Africa in order to save the lives six anti-apartheid activists.

Pressure from abroad finally led to sentences of all six being commuted to 18–25 years in prison by President Pieter Willem Botha, and between 1991 and 1992 they were all released from prison.

== See also ==
- Internal resistance to South African apartheid
- United Nations Security Council Resolution 610
- List of United Nations Security Council Resolutions 601 to 700 (1987–1991)
- South Africa under apartheid
