= Boipatong Memorial and Youth Heritage Centre =

Memorial and Centre, South Africa

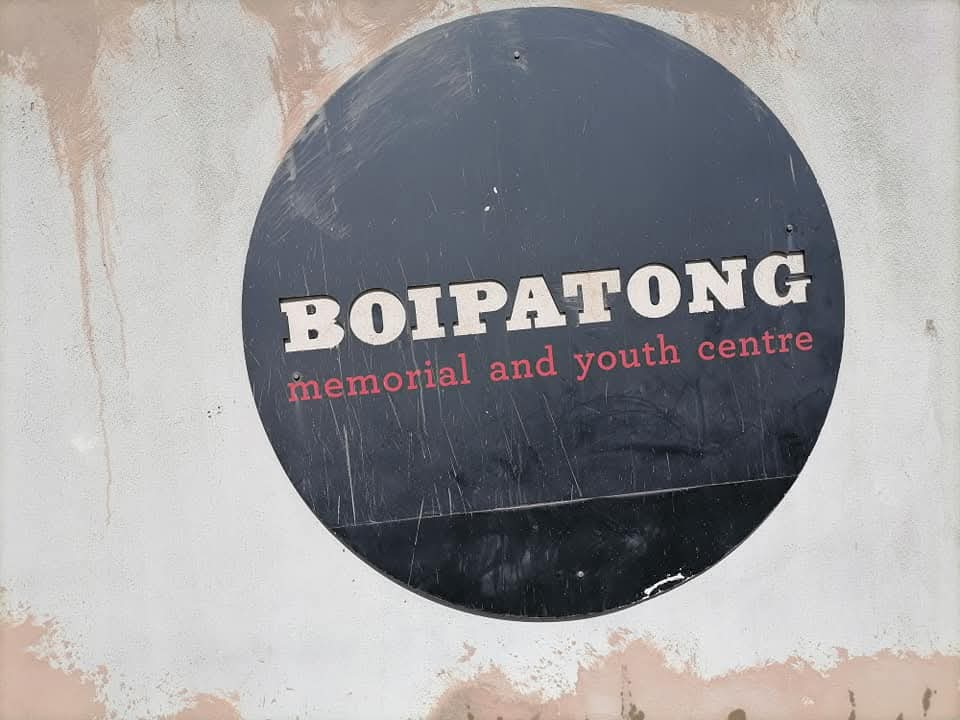
- Interactive map of the Boipatong Memorial and Youth Heritage Centre area
- Alternative names: Boipatong Monument

General information
- Location: Boipatong, Vanderbijlpark, South Africa
- Opened: 17 June 2016
- Cost: R34 million – R40 million
- Owner: Gauteng Department of Sports, Arts, Culture and Recreation

The Boipatong Memorial and Youth Heritage Centre (often referred to as the Boipatong Monument) is a South African heritage site and community center located in the township of Boipatong, near Vanderbijlpark in the Gauteng Province. The center was established to honor the victims of the Boipatong massacre, which took place on 17 June 1992, and to serve as a hub for local youth development, skills training, and historical education.

== History ==
The center stands as a direct memorial to the Boipatong massacre, an important event in South Africa’s transition out of apartheid. On the night of 17 June 1992, a heavily armed group of Inkatha Freedom Party (IFP) hostel-dwellers from the nearby Kwa-Madala migrant worker hostel attacked the sleeping residents of the Boipatong township. The attack resulted in the deaths of dozens of people, including women and infants, and left scores injured.

At the time, multi-party negotiations under the Convention for a Democratic South Africa (CODESA) were underway to establish a democratic framework for the country. Following allegations of state complicity and the involvement of apartheid security forces in facilitating the attack, the African National Congress (ANC) walked out of the CODESA talks. This suspension marked a significant turning point in South Africa’s modern political history, forcing greater international scrutiny and eventually compelling then-President F. W. de Klerk to implement stricter controls over security forces before negotiations could resume.

== Construction and opening ==
The project was commissioned by the Gauteng Provincial Government through the former Department of Public Works, Roads and Transport (later the Department of Infrastructure Development) and the Department of Sports, Arts, Culture and Recreation (SACR), in partnership with the Sedibeng District Municipality. The total construction budget was estimated between R34 million and R40 million, with funding contributions supplemented by private sector investments, including a consortium involved in the construction of the Gautrain.

The completed structure was officially opened on 17 June 2016 by Gauteng premier,David Makhura, to coincide with the 24th anniversary commemoration of the massacre. The opening ceremony was attended by Gauteng MEC for Sports, Arts, Culture and Recreation Faith Mazibuko, regional officials; survivors; and family members of the victims. The event featured a wreath-laying ceremony at the nearby Vuka Cemetery in Sharpeville, where many of the victims are buried.

== Features and facilities ==
The facility was architecturally designed to blend historical retrospection with functional community space. It consists of two main programmatic divisions:

- The Memorial and Exhibition Centre: This section features interactive displays, curated photographs, and multi-media exhibitions documenting the events of 17 June 1992. The exhibit outlines the stories of the victims, testimonies from the Truth and Reconciliation Commission (TRC), and the role the massacre played in fast-tracking South Africa’s constitutional democracy.
- The Youth Heritage Centre: Built to address contemporary socioeconomic challenges in the Vaal region, this space was designed to offer local youth resources for computer literacy, youth services, and skills development.

== Operational status, controversy and neglect ==
Following its high-profile opening in 2016, the facility faced significant operational hurdles. Despite substantial provincial expenditure earmarked for ongoing maintenance and operations, parts of the facility remained largely underutilized or non-functional to the local public for several years due to administrative delays and community disputes regarding staffing and resources. Civil society and political opposition groups have frequently raised concerns regarding the mismanagement of funds and the slow handover of the multi-million rand precinct to the local community.

== Gallery ==
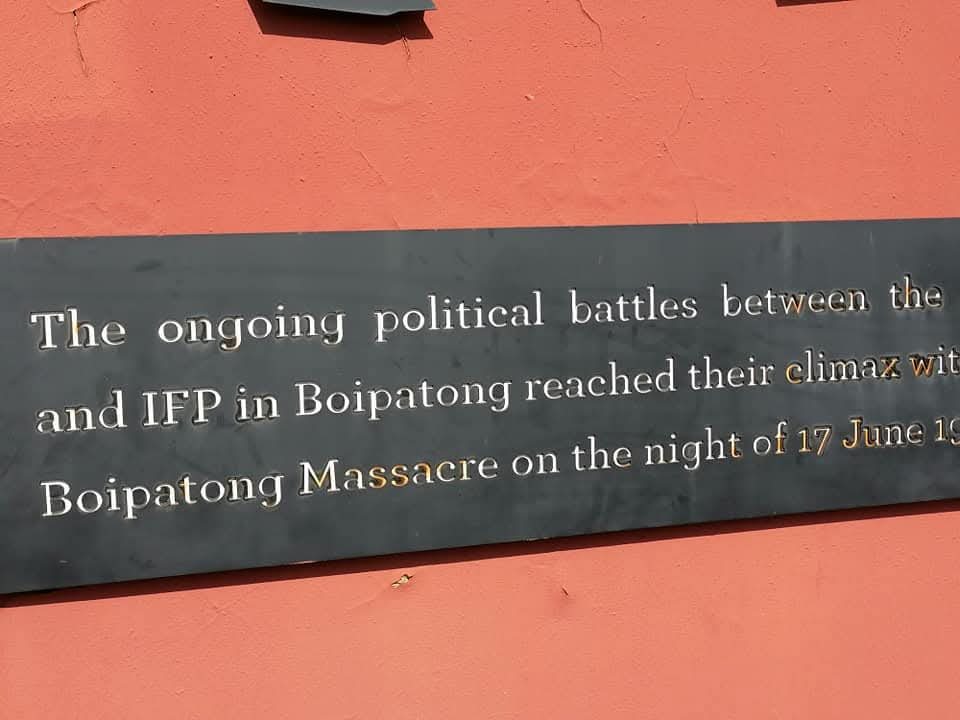
Displays outside the building

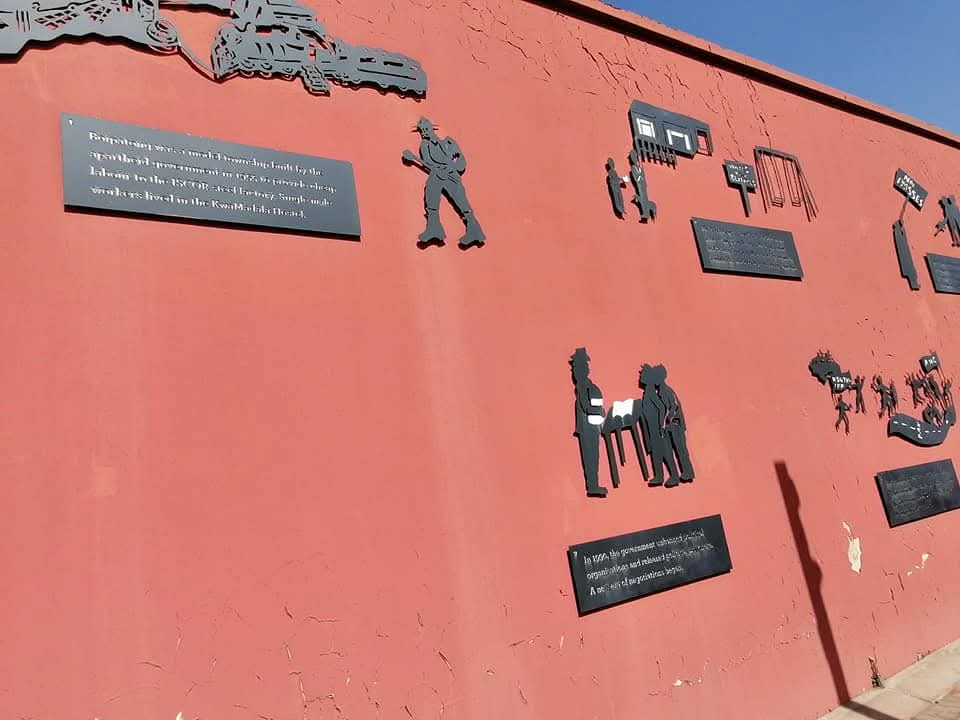
Displays on the walls

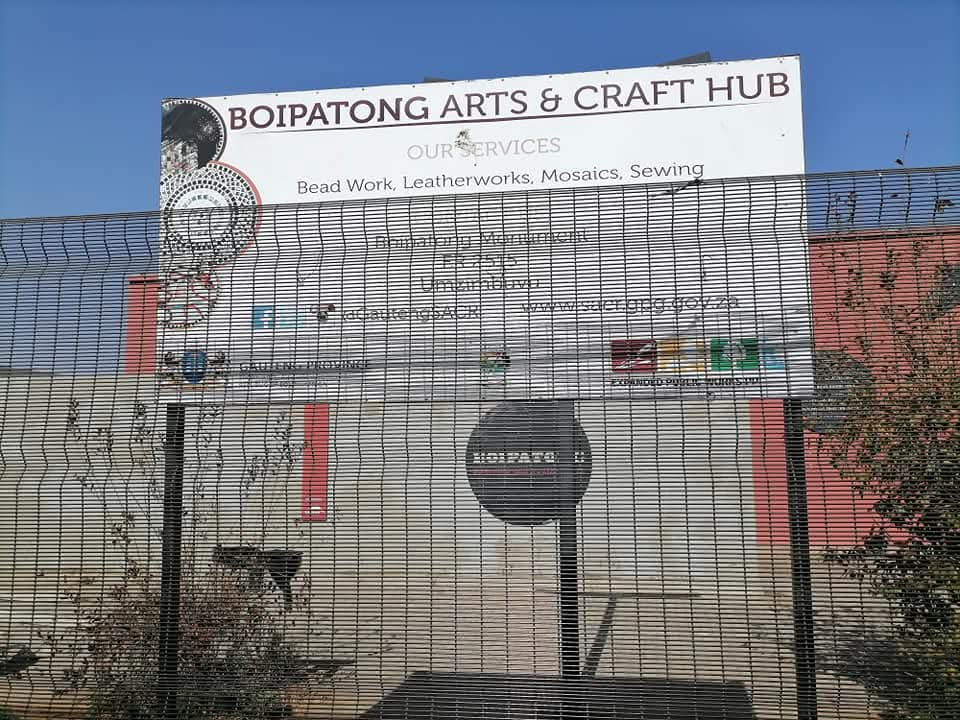
Boipatong Arts and Craft Hub

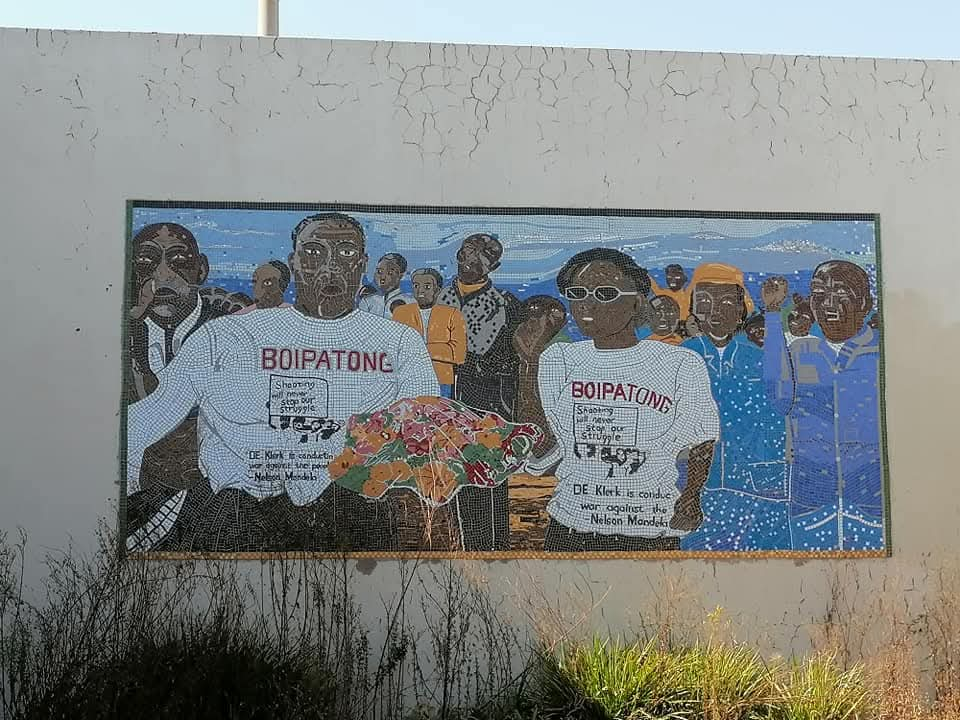
Boipatong Memorial and Youth Center

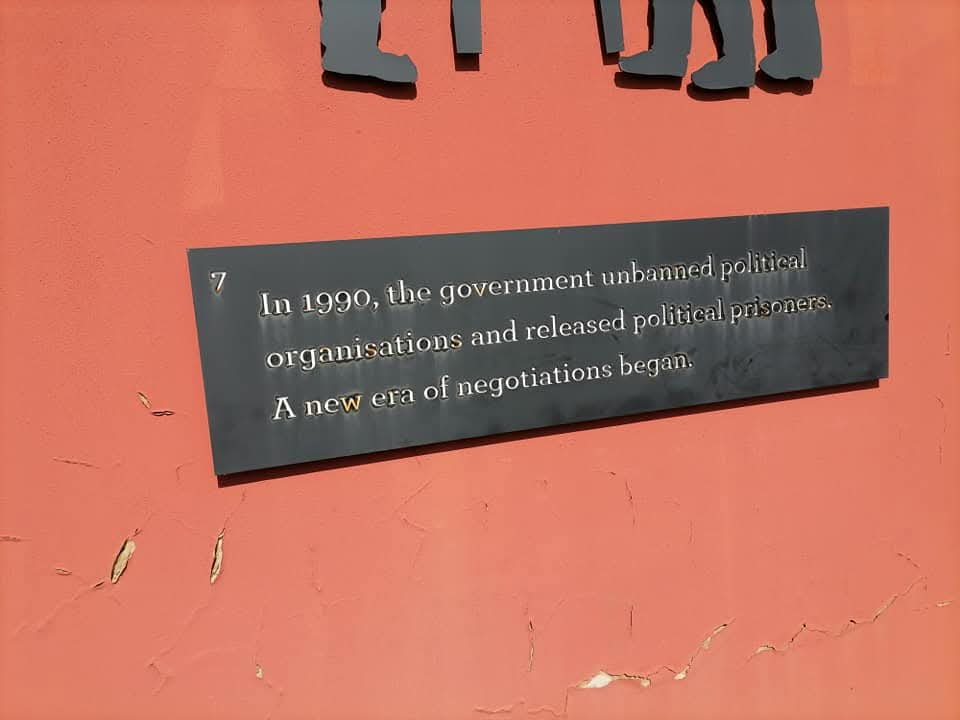
The story

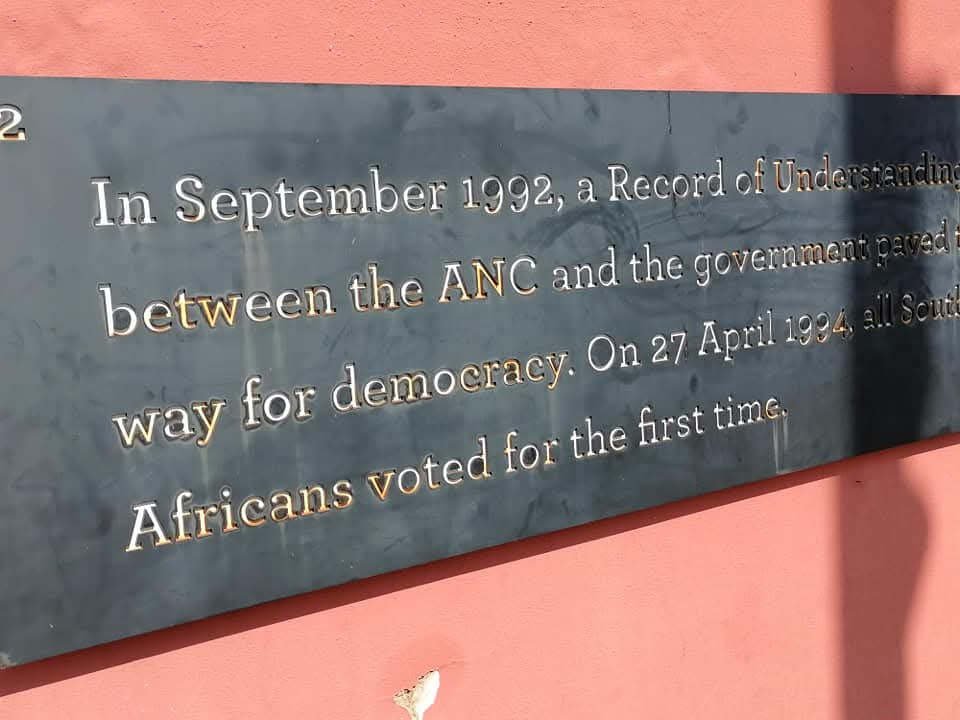
September 1992

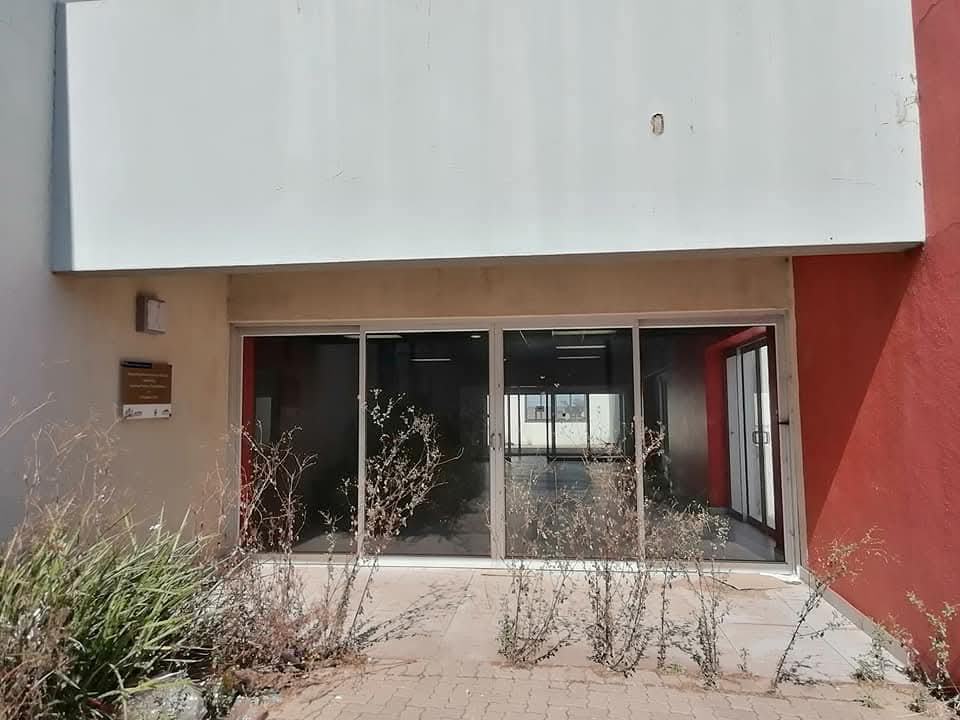
Under neglect in 2021

== See also ==
- Boipatong massacre
- Convention for a Democratic South Africa (CODESA)
- Truth and Reconciliation Commission (South Africa)
- Sharpeville massacre
- Sharpeville Human Rights Precinct
