= Sharpeville massacre =

1960 South African Police killing of protestors

Coordinates: 26°41′18″S 27°52′19″E

- Part of the Internal resistance to apartheid
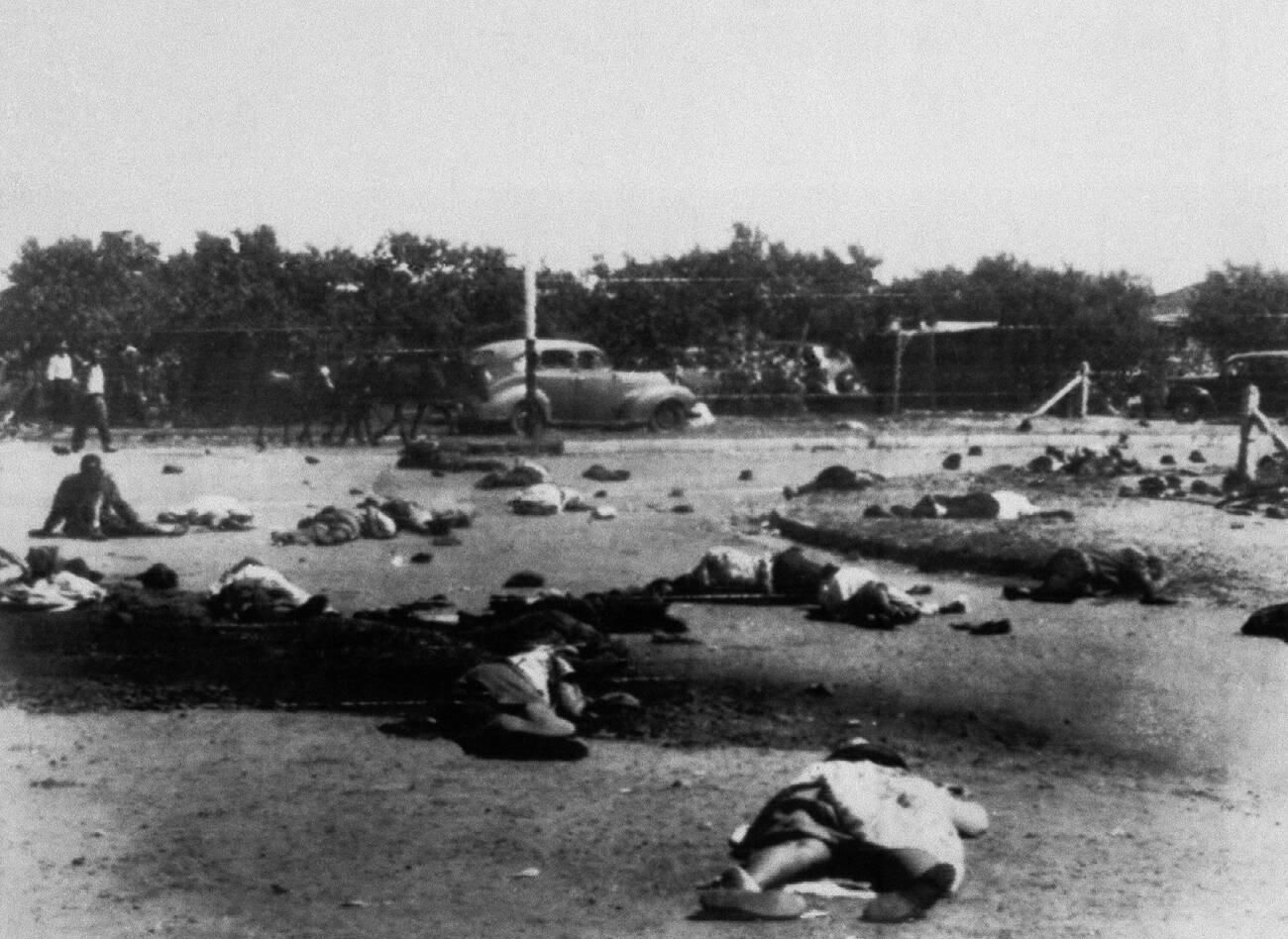
- Victims lying on the ground after police opened fire on a crowd of protesters
- Location: Sharpeville, Transvaal Province, South Africa
- Date: 21 March 1960; 66 years ago
- Deaths: 91
- Injuries: 238
- Assailant: South African Police

The Sharpeville massacre occurred on 21 March 1960, when police opened fire on a crowd of people who had assembled outside the police station in the township of Sharpeville in the then Transvaal Province of the then Union of South Africa (today part of Gauteng) to protest against the apartheid system and its pass laws.

A crowd of approximately 5,000 people gathered in Sharpeville that day in response to the call made by the Pan-Africanist Congress to leave their pass-books at home and to demand that the police arrest them for contravening the pass laws. The protesters were told that they would be addressed by a government official and they waited outside the police station as more police officers arrived, including senior members of the Security Branch. At 1.30 pm, without issuing a warning, the police fired 1,344 rounds into the crowd.

For more than fifty years the number of people killed and injured has been based on the police record, which included 249 victims in total, including 29 children, with 69 people killed and 180 injured. More recent research has shown that at least 91 people were killed at Sharpeville and at least 238 people were wounded. Many people were shot in the back as they fled from the police.

The massacre was photographed by photographer Ian Berry, who initially thought the police were firing blanks. In present-day South Africa, 21 March is commemorated as a public holiday in honour of human rights and to commemorate the Sharpeville massacre.

In 2024, the area where the massacre occurred and the memorial became a World Heritage Site, known as Nelson Mandela Legacy Sites.

== Life in Sharpeville before the massacre ==
Sharpeville was first built in 1943 to replace Topville, a nearby township that suffered overcrowding where illnesses like pneumonia were widespread. Due to the illness, removals from Topville began in 1958. Approximately 10,000 Indigenous Africans were forcibly removed to Sharpeville. Sharpeville had a high rate of unemployment as well as high crime rates. There were also youth problems because many children joined gangs and were affiliated with crimes instead of schools. Furthermore, a new police station was created, from which the police were energetic to check passes, deporting illegal residents, and raiding illegal shebeens.

== Preceding events ==
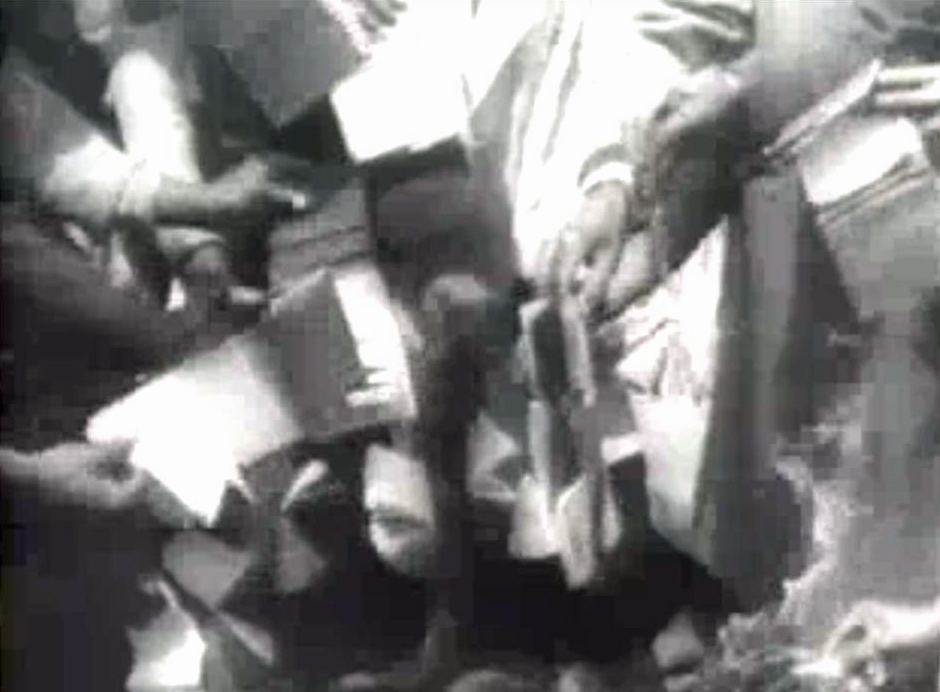
Demonstrators discarding their passbooks to protest apartheid, 1960

South African governments since the eighteenth century had enacted measures to restrict the flow of Africans into cities. Pass laws, intended to control and restrict their movement and employment, were updated in the 1950s. Under the country's National Party government, African residents in urban districts were subject to "influx control" measures. Individuals over sixteen were required to carry passbooks, which contained an identity card, employment and influx authorisation from a labour bureau, name of employer and address, and details of personal history. Leading up to the Sharpeville massacre, the National Party administration under the leadership of Hendrik Verwoerd used these laws to enforce greater racial segregation and in 1959–1960, extended them to include women. From the 1960s, the pass laws were the primary instrument used by the state to detain and harass its political opponents. These laws forced Africans to carry special identification that police and other authorities could check at any time. The government used passes to restrict where Africans could work, live and travel.

The Pan-Africanist Congress (PAC), led by its founding President Robert Sobukwe, marched peacefully and unarmed to the Orlando police station in Soweto and demanded to be arrested as they were not prepared to carry pass passbooks. Simultaneously, on the 21st of March, a university student and member of the PAC, Philip Ata Kgosana, led the very same march in the Cape Province in Langa Township.

== Massacre ==
On 21 March 1960, a group of approximately 5,000 people gathered at the Sharpeville police station, offering themselves up for arrest for not carrying their passbooks. The Sharpeville police were not completely unprepared for the demonstration, as they had already driven smaller groups of more militant activists away the previous night.

The PAC actively organized to increase turnout to the demonstration, distributing pamphlets and appearing in person to urge people not to go to work on the day of the protest. Many of the civilians present attended voluntarily to support the protest, but there is evidence that the PAC also used coercive means to draw the crowd there, including the cutting of telephone lines into Sharpeville, and preventing bus drivers from driving their routes.

By 10:00, a large crowd had gathered, and the atmosphere was initially peaceful and festive. Fewer than 20 police officers were present in the station at the start of the protest. Later the crowd grew to about 20,000, and while some news reports described the mood as "ugly", this has been contested by witnesses who were there, including photographer Ian Berry. 130 police officers supported by four Saracen armoured personnel carriers arrived in Sharpeville. The police were armed with firearms, including Sten submachine guns and Lee–Enfield rifles. There was no evidence that anyone in the gathering was armed with anything other than stones.

F-86 Sabre jets and Harvard Trainers approached to within 30 metres (98 ft) of the ground, flying low over the crowd in an attempt to scatter it. The protesters responded by hurling stones (striking three policemen) and rushing the police barricades. According to some accounts, police officers attempted to use tear gas to repel these advances, but it proved ineffectual, and the police fell back on the use of their batons. However, there is no evidence that the police tried to use tear gas to disperse the crowd, or that they charged the crowd with batons. At about 13:00 the police tried to arrest a protester, and the crowd surged forward. At 13:30, the police began shooting without issuing a warning to the crowd to disperse. Within two minutes, they had shot 1,344 rounds.

=== Death and injury toll ===
The apartheid-era police records indicate that 69 people were killed, including 10 children, and 180 injured, including 19 children. This figure has subsequently been shown to have been greatly under-estimated. New research has shown that at least 91 people were killed and more than 238 people wounded. The police shot many people in the back as they turned to flee, causing some to be paralyzed.

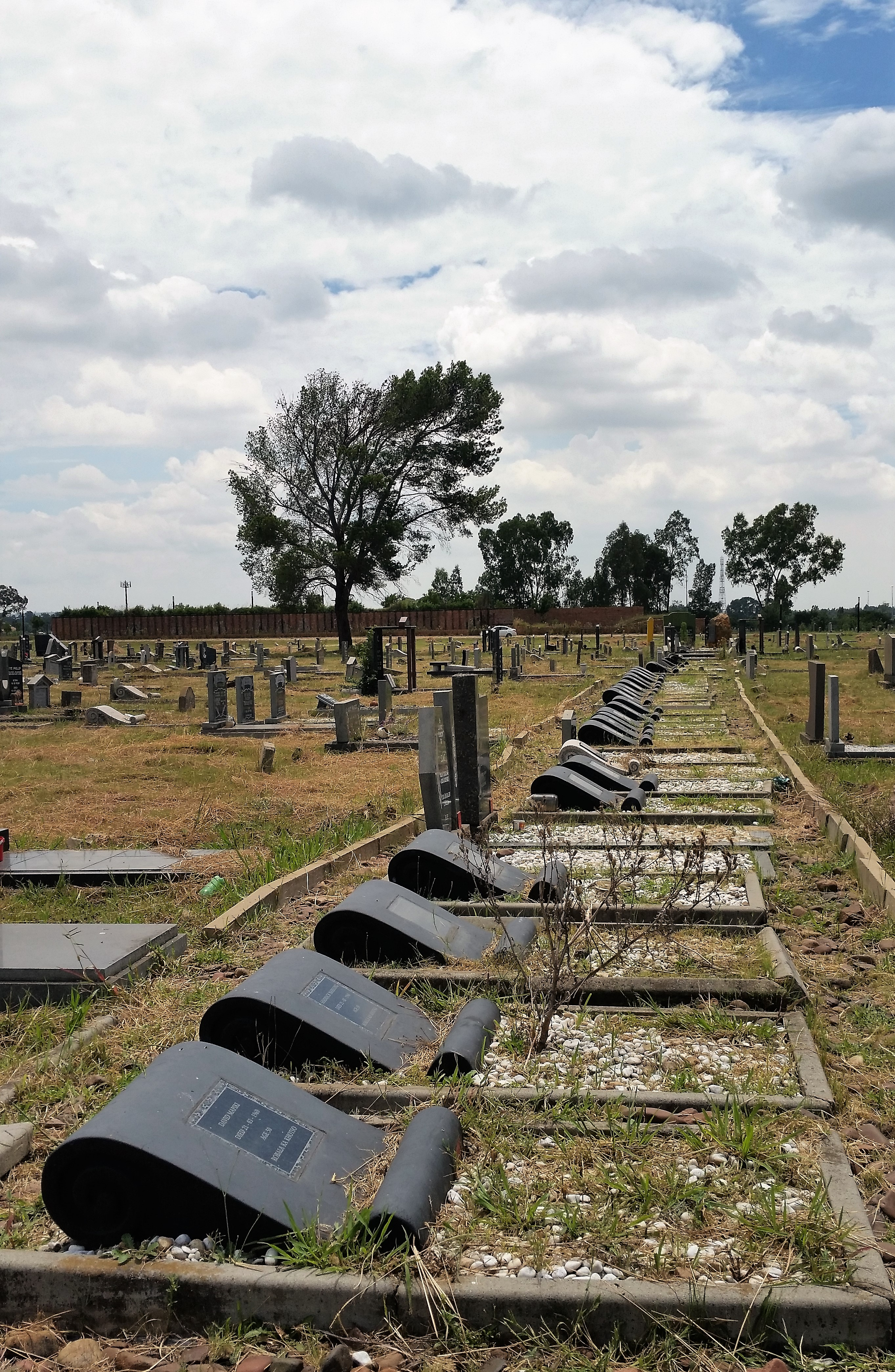
The row of graves of victims of the Sharpeville massacre, in Phelindaba Cemetery, Sharpeville

Many of the victims were buried en masse in a ceremony performed by clergy. Philip Finkie Molefe, responsible for establishing the first Assemblies of God church in the Vaal, was among the clergy that conducted the service.

=== Pretext for firing ===
Police reports in 1960 claimed that young and inexperienced police officers panicked and opened fire spontaneously, setting off a chain reaction that lasted about forty seconds. Few of the policemen present had received public order training. Some of them had been on duty for over twenty-four hours without respite. Some insight into the mindset of those on the police force was provided by Lieutenant Colonel Pienaar, the commanding officer of the police reinforcements at Sharpeville, who said in his statement that "the native mentality does not allow them to gather for a peaceful demonstration. For them to gather means violence." He also denied giving any order to fire and stated that he would not have done so.

The Truth and Reconciliation Commission found in 1998 that "the evidence of Commission deponents reveals a degree of deliberation in the decision to open fire at Sharpeville and indicates that the shooting was more than the result of inexperienced and frightened police officers losing their nerve."

== Response ==
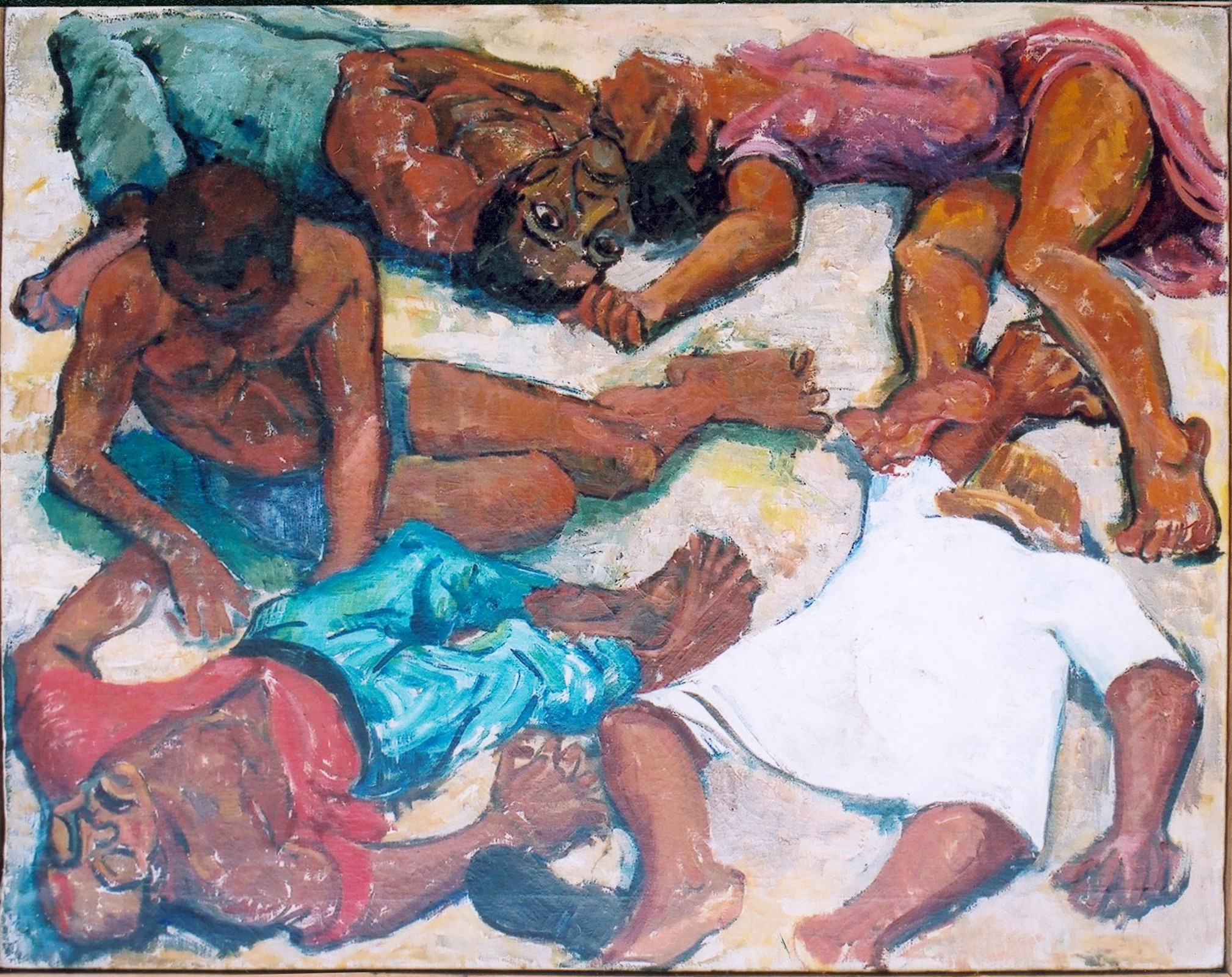
Painting depicting victims of the massacre, by Godfrey Rubens on display at the South African consulate in London

The uproar among South Africa's black population was immediate, and the following week saw demonstrations, protest marches, strikes, and riots around the country. On 30 March 1960, the government declared a state of emergency, detaining more than 18,000 people, including prominent anti-apartheid activists who were known as members of the Congress Alliance including Nelson Mandela and some still enmeshed in the Treason Trial.

Many white South Africans were also horrified by the massacre. The poet Duncan Livingstone, a Scottish immigrant from the Isle of Mull who lived in Pretoria, wrote in response to the massacre the Scottish Gaelic poem "Bean Dubh a' Caoidh a Fir a Chaidh a Marbhadh leis a' Phoileas" ("A Black Woman Mourns her Husband Killed by the Police").

A storm of international protest followed the Sharpeville shootings, including sympathetic demonstrations in many countries and condemnation by the United Nations. On 1 April 1960, the United Nations Security Council passed Resolution 134. Sharpeville marked a turning point in South Africa's history; the country found itself increasingly isolated in the international community. The event also played a role in South Africa's departure from the Commonwealth of Nations in 1961.

The Sharpeville massacre contributed to the banning of the PAC and ANC as illegal organisations. The massacre was one of the catalysts for a shift from nonviolent resistance and civil disobedience to guerrilla warfare, terrorism, and conventional warfare by these organisations. The foundation of Poqo, the military wing of the PAC, and Umkhonto we Sizwe, the military wing of the ANC, followed shortly afterwards.

Not all reactions were negative: embroiled in its opposition to the Civil Rights Movement, the Mississippi House of Representatives voted for a resolution supporting the South African government "for its steadfast policy of segregation and the [staunch] adherence to their traditions in the face of overwhelming external agitation." The resolution passed 78–8 in the Mississippi House of Representatives and 45–0 in the Mississippi State Senate.

== Commemoration ==
Since 1994, 21 March has been commemorated as Human Rights Day in South Africa.

Sharpeville was the site selected by President Nelson Mandela for the signing into law of the Constitution of South Africa on 10 December 1996.

In 1998, the Truth and Reconciliation Commission (TRC) found that the police actions constituted "gross human rights violations in that excessive force was unnecessarily used to stop a gathering of unarmed people."

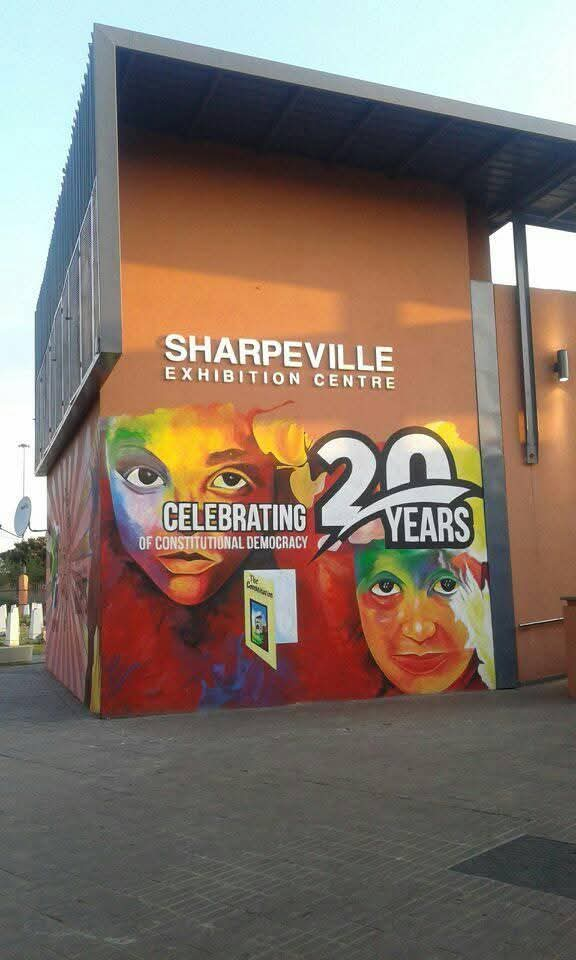
Sharpeville Exhibition Centre and Memorial

On 21 March 2002, the 42nd anniversary of the massacre, a memorial was opened by former President Nelson Mandela as part of the Sharpeville Human Rights Precinct.

In 2024, the area where the massacre occurred and the memorial became a World Heritage Site, known as Nelson Mandela Legacy Sites.

=== International Day for the Elimination of Racial Discrimination ===
UNESCO marks 21 March as the yearly International Day for the Elimination of Racial Discrimination, in memory of the massacre.

== References in art and literature ==
The Afrikaner poet Ingrid Jonker mentioned the Sharpeville Massacre in her verse.

The event was an inspiration for painter Oliver Lee Jackson in his Sharpeville Series from the 1970s.

Ingrid de Kok was a child living on a mining compound near Johannesburg where her father worked at the time of the Sharpeville massacre. In her poem "Our Sharpeville" she reflects on the atrocity through the eyes of a child.

Max Roach's 1960 album We Insist! Freedom Now Suite includes the composition "Tears for Johannesburg" in response to the massacre.

South African artist Gavin Jantjes dedicated several prints in his series A South African Colouring Book (1974–75) to the Sharpeville Massacre. Iconic reportage photographs of scattering protesters are arranged alongside stenciled and handwritten captions pulled from news reporting of the unfolding event.

The Sharpeville massacre forms part of Wilbur Smith's historical novel, Rage.

The massacre is referenced in the 1992 book Tandia, by South African author Bryce Courtenay.

The story of the massacre was adapted by folk musician Ewan MacColl as The Ballad of Sharpeville, who performed it with Peggy Seeger on their 1977 album, Saturday Night at The Bull and Mouth.

== See also ==
- List of massacres in South Africa
- Boipatong massacre
- 1922 Turin massacre, a similar event in Italy
- Polish 1970 protests, a similar event in Poland
- 2018–2019 Gaza border protests, a similar toll over months at the Gaza-Israeli border.
- Gwangju Uprising, a similar event in South Korea
- Thammasat University massacre, a similar event in Thailand
- February 28 incident, a similar event in Taiwan
- Wanpaoshan Incident, a similar event in Eastern Asia
- Marikana massacre – August 2012 police shooting of approximately 34 striking miners widely compared to Sharpeville
- Sharpeville Six – six people convicted from a demonstration in Sharpeville in 1984 which drew international attention
- United Nations Security Council Resolution 610
- United Nations Security Council Resolution 615
- Year of Africa
- Bulhoek massacre
