= United Nations Security Council Resolution 894 =

UN Security Council Resolution 894
- the soon-to-be adopted new Flag of South Africa
- Date: 14 January 1994
- Meeting no.: 3,329
- Code: S/RES/894 (Document)
- Subject: South Africa
- Voting summary: 15 voted for; None voted against; None abstained
- Result: Adopted

Security Council composition
- Permanent members: China; France; Russia; United Kingdom; United States
- Non-permanent members: Argentina; Brazil; Czech Republic; Djibouti; New Zealand; Nigeria; Oman; Pakistan; Rwanda; Spain

On 14 January 1994, the United Nations Security Council unanimously adopted resolution 894 which discusses various aspects relating to the upcoming South African General Elections. This occurred after the council recalled resolutions 765 (1992) and 772 (1992) on South Africa.

The Security Council welcomed the progress towards a democratic, non-racial and united South Africa, and especially the establishment of the Transitional Executive Council, the Independent Electoral Commission and the agreement on a temporary constitution. The elections were to take place on 27 April 1994 and various laws passed provided a legal framework for it. Meanwhile, the United Nations Observer Mission in South Africa (UNOMSA) had contributed to the reduction in violence and the transition process, while the efforts of the Organisation of African Unity (OAU), Commonwealth of Nations and European Union were praised. The Secretary-General Boutros Boutros-Ghali was asked to prepare for a potential role for the United Nations in the electoral process, and the request of the Transitional Executive Council concerning the requirement of international observers to monitor the process was noted.

Recommendations on the size and mandate of UNOMSA were agreed by the Council relating to peace promotion and reducing violence, urging all parties in South Africa to adhere to democratic principles and take part in the elections. It also asked the parties to guarantee the safety of election observers and to take measures to end violence and intimidation. The intention of the Secretary-General to set up a Trust Fund to finance international observers was welcomed, deciding to remain seized of the matter until South Africa became a democratic, non-racial and united country.

== See also ==
- List of United Nations Security Council Resolutions 801 to 900 (1993–1994)
- Negotiations to end apartheid in South Africa
- Apartheid
