= Sharpeville Human Rights Precinct =

Apartheid memorial site in Gauteng, South Africa

- Sharpeville Memorial and Exhibition Centres
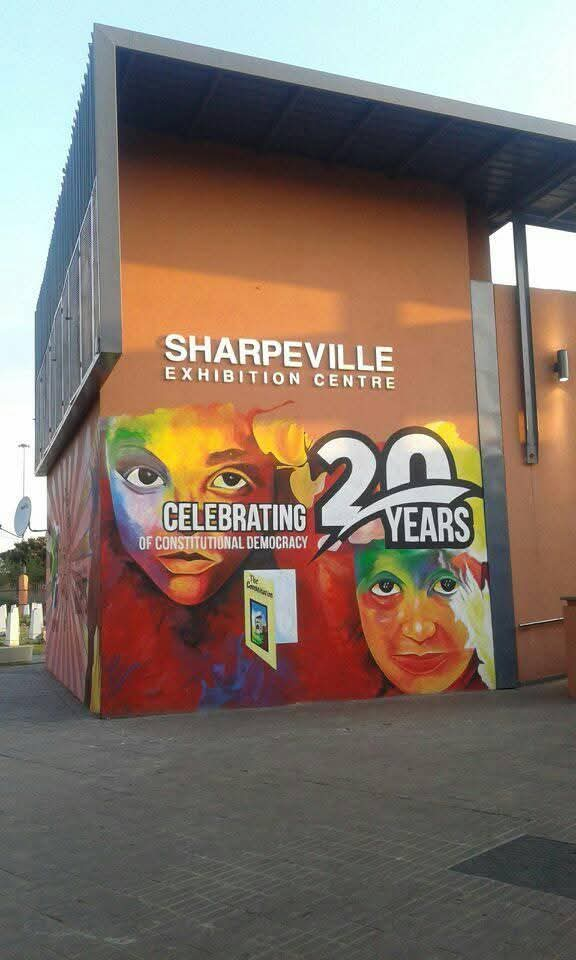
- Sharpeville Exhibition Centre and Memorial
- Established: 2001
- Location: Seeiso / Zwane Street, Sharpeville, Gauteng, South Africa
- Coordinates: 26°41′14″S 27°52′16″E
- Type: Memorial site and museum
- Architect: GREENinc architecture
- Public transit access: Sharpeville Library

The Sharpeville Human Rights Precinct (also known as the Sharpeville Memorial and Exhibition Centre or Sharpeville Heritage Precinct) is a historical memorial site located in the township of Sharpeville, near Vereeniging in the Gauteng province of South Africa. The precinct serves as a monument dedicated to the victims of the Sharpeville massacre, an event that took place on 21 March 1960 that significantly accelerated the anti-apartheid struggle.

The site is historically significant as the location where apartheid police opened fire on a crowd of peaceful protesters organized by the Pan Africanist Congress (PAC), killing 69 people and injuring 180 others. Former South African President Nelson Mandela, who officially opened the memorial, referred to Sharpeville as the "Cradle of Human Rights".

== Historical context ==
In 1959, political differences within the African National Congress (ANC) led to Robert Sobukwe breaking away to form the Pan-Africanist Congress (PAC). Both organizations actively targeted the Pass laws (dompas), an oppressive pillar of the apartheid system that required Black citizens to carry identification documents to regulate their movement.

While the ANC planned a defiance campaign to commence on 31 March 1960, the PAC launched its own targeted protest on Monday, 21 March 1960. Protesters were urged to march peacefully to local police stations without their passbooks, effectively inviting arrest to overload the prison system.

Thousands gathered outside the Sharpeville police station. In a state of panic, police opened fire into the unarmed crowd, and many were shot in the back while fleeing. The incident caused massive international outrage with a state of emergency declared in the country. This led the United Nations to declare March 21 as the International Day for the Elimination of Racial Discrimination. In democratic South Africa, the date is commemorated annually as a national public holiday known as Human Rights Day.

== Architectural design and features ==
The Sharpeville Memorial Garden was designed by GREENinc Architects, with a design team led by Anton Comrie and James French. The design of the precinct symbolizes the gravity of the events of 1960.

=== The Memorial Wall and Entrance ===
At the main entrance stands a dramatic memorial wall displaying the full names of the 69 victims who lost their lives during the massacre.

=== The Symbolic Pillars and Water Features ===
The main garden features 69 distinct pillars, each representing an individual fatality from the shooting. A central stream flows from a foundational fountain, slicing through the garden area. The thin jets of water are designed to represent bleeding wounds, while the concrete channel carrying the water through the center symbolizes the blood that flowed down the township streets on that day.

=== Exhibition Gallery and Constitution Walk ===
Adjacent to the main monument area is the Exhibition Gallery, which contains an extensive archival collection of historical photographs, news clippings, and posters documenting the massacre and the broader struggle against apartheid. The precinct also incorporates a designated "Constitution Walk," linking the memory of the struggle directly to the modern, democratic South African Constitution signed into law by Nelson Mandela in nearby Vereeniging in 1996.

== Spatial layout ==
The geographic placement and structure of the heritage complex are arranged relative to the local street grid:

                      [ ZWANE STREET ]
________________________    ___     ________________________
                       |   |   |   |
                       |   | M |   |
   [ FORMER SHARPEVILLE|   | E |   |      [ CONSTITUTION
     POLICE STATION ]  |   | M |   |          WALK ]
                       |   | O |   |
   (Epicenter of 1960  |   | R |   |    (Path linking history
     confrontation)    |   | I |   |     to the 1996 signing)
                       |   | A |   |
_______________________|   | L |   |________________________
                           |   |   |
     [ EXHIBITION GALLERY ]| W |   | [ 69 SYMBOLIC PILLARS ]
    Archival photography & | A |   | (Landscaped garden &
    historical news media  | L |   |  fountain water channels)
                           | L |   |
___________________________|___|___|________________________
                      [ SEEISO STREET ]
                             │
                             ▼ (Approx. 1.5 km south)
                   [ PHELINDABA CEMETERY ]
                 (Mass graves of the 69 victims)

== Associated sites ==
The former apartheid police station, which is located directly opposite the modern memorial complex, was the epicenter of the 1960 confrontation. The Phelindaba Cemetery, situated a short distance away, is the final resting place of the massacre victims, who were buried together in a long, historic row of graves marked by a small PAC-colored memorial. A secondary memorial complex was inaugurated at the graveyard site in 2011 to further honor the deceased.

== Tourism ==
The Sharpeville Human Rights Precinct is recognized as one of the essential heritage sites tracking the rise and fall of apartheid. It forms part of the regional heritage route in the Sedibeng District Municipality, working in conjunction with local historical points such as the Vaal Teknorama Museum in Vereeniging. The precinct serves both as a solemn sanctuary for the families of the victims and an educational resource for domestic and international visitors studying human rights.

== See also ==
- Boipatong Memorial and Youth Heritage Centre
