= Operation Marion =

1980s domestic military operation in South Africa

- Part of South Africa under Apartheid
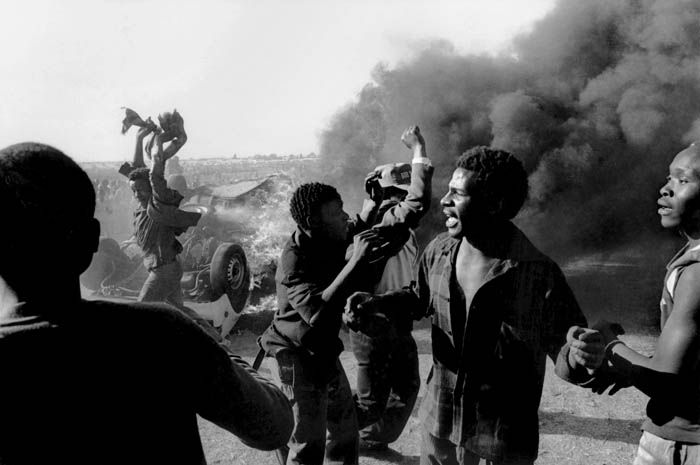
- An anti-apartheid protest in South Africa in the 1980s.
Date	1985 – 1989
Location	South Africa
Action	KwaMakhutha Massacre; Trust Feed Massacre; Boipatong massacre

Belligerents
United Democratic Front; Confederation of South African Trade Unions	South African Defence Force; Inkatha Freedom Party

Operation Marion was a domestic military operation fielded by the South African Defence Force (SADF) during the 1980s. The apartheid security forces trained Inkatha operatives to build an irregular militia.

== History ==
Operation Marion became an important element of the apartheid government's response to the rising popular insurgency led by the United Democratic Front and the Congress of South African Trade Unions during the 1980s. SADF Special Forces trained a Zulu militia at a camp in the Caprivi Strip in 1985. The first group of Zulu militia from the Inkatha Freedom Party (IFP) were dispatched to the Caprivi Strip from Durban by C-130 aircraft on 16 April 1986.

On 20 January 1987 the militia were used in what later became known as the KwaMakhutha Massacre when 13 people were killed as a result of flawed intelligence. In January 1988 IFP leader Mangosuthu Buthelezi again approached Chief of Staff Intelligence asking for additional training of his militia in order to swing the balance of power against the United Democratic Front (UDF) and Confederation of South African Trade Unions (COSATU) forces, then operating as a surrogate for the African National Congress (ANC) in areas of KwaZulu. This request was interpreted as consistent with the Total National Strategy then in place, so the support was given.

On 1 December 1988, a vigilante force from the IFP took over a place called Trust Feed, which had recently become a UDF centre of power. On 3 December, the Trust Feed Massacre took place, killing 11 and wounding 2.

The perpetrators were brought to trial and sentenced to 15 years in prison on 23 May 1992. One of the most high-impact activities allegedly arising from Operation Marion was the Boipatong massacre by IFP members, which left 43 dead on 17 June 1992. This event became a turning point for the Convention for a Democratic South Africa (CODESA) when Nelson Mandela withdrew the ANC over claims of police involvement. The activities arising from Operation Marion became the subject of intense investigation by the Goldstone Commission of Enquiry. The Commission appointed Peter Waddington to make an independent enquiry, which reported no evidence of police collusion in the massacre.
