= Angela King (diplomat) =

Jamaican diplomat

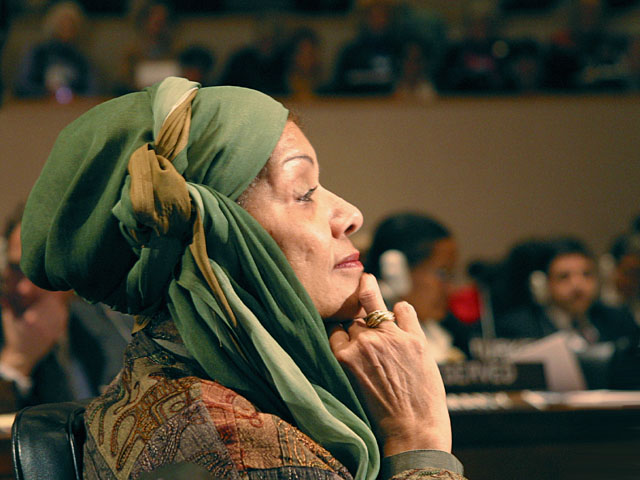
Angela King attending observance of the International Women's Day at the United Nations Headquarters in 2003.

Angela Evelyn Vernon King (28 August 1938 – 5 February 2007) was a Jamaican diplomat. She worked for the United Nations for 38 years, from 1966 to 2004, working mainly for equal rights for women. She was appointed Assistant Secretary-General for gender issues in 1997, remaining in that post until she retired in 2004.

== Early life ==
King was born in Kingston, Jamaica. Her father was Canon R.O.C. King; her brother was Peter King. She was educated at St Hilda's High School and Wolmer High School in Kingston, and studied for a B.A. in history at the University College of the West Indies. She received an MA in educational sociology and administration from the University of London in 1962. She then joined the Foreign Office of the newly independent Jamaica, and was posted to Jamaica's Permanent Mission at the United Nations in New York City.

== UN career ==
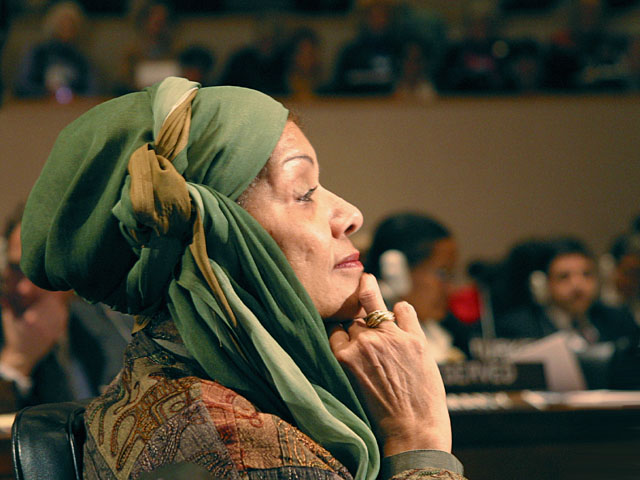
Ms. Angela E.V. King attending observance of the International Women's Day at the United Nations Headquarters in 2003.

King joined the UN Secretariat in 1966, working on matters relating to human rights and social development. She was a founding member of the UN's Group on Equal Rights for Women (GERWUN), and chaired the UN's United Nations Commission on the Status of Women (UN CSW). She headed the UN Observer Mission in South Africa (UNOMSA) in 1992 to 1994, as apartheid was dismantled. Boutros Boutros Ghali's decision to choose a black woman to head the mission was praised by Nelson Mandela, who also complimented King her work.

Angela King was named Director of the Division for the Advancement of Women (DAW) of the Department for Economic and Social Affairs on 1 February 1996. In February 1997, the UN Secretary-General Kofi Annan appointed Ms. Angela E.V. King as his Special Adviser on Gender Issues and Advancement of Women. The appointment, at the level of Assistant Secretary-General, took effect on 1 March 1997. Ms. King chaired the Inter-Agency Network on Women and Gender and Equality and was supported by the Division for the Advancement of Women. She participated in the UN conferences on women's rights, from the inaugural meeting in Mexico City in 1975 to the landmark Fourth World Conference on Women in Beijing 20 years later which led to the Beijing Platform for Action. She organized a special session of the UN General Assembly in 2000 to review its implementation, known as "Beijing+5", and pushed for the UN Security Council to adopt Resolution 1325 (2000), calling for greater protection for women in war, and prosecution of offenders against women. She retired in 2004, but continued to attend and address UN meetings on women's issues, including the 50th session of the Commission on the Status of Women.

== Death ==
She died of breast cancer, aged 68, at New York City's Memorial Sloan-Kettering Cancer Centre. She was survived by her son.
