= Execution of Benjamin Moloise =

1985 execution in South Africa

Benjamin Moloise
- Born: Malesela Benjamin Moloise; 1955; Alexandra, South Africa
- Died: 18 October 1985 (aged 30); Pretoria Central Prison, South Africa
- Occupation: Upholsterer
- Conviction: Murder
- Penalty: Execution by hanging

Malesela Benjamin Moloise (c. 1955 – 18 October 1985) was a South African poet and political activist who came to international attention following his arrest and subsequent execution by the government of South Africa. From Soweto, Moloise worked as an upholsterer before turning to poetry during his time on death row. In 1983, Moloise was arrested for the 1982 murder of Phillipus Selepe, a black security policeman who assisted in capturing three African National Congress (ANC) members. Although he initially confessed to the murder, he later retracted the statement during his trial. Moloise's death sentence sparked national and international outrage and was seen as emblematic of South Africa's brutal crackdown on anti-apartheid activists.

Throughout Moloise's trial, allegations arose about the legitimacy of the evidence against him, the veracity of his confession, and the overall fairness of the process. Following a refusal of clemency or retrial by President P. W. Botha, Moloise was executed in 1985. His execution sparked riots in Johannesburg, protests in major world cities, and a flurry of diplomatic condemnations. The legacy of Moloise's life, death, and anti-apartheid poems penned during his time on death row transcended South Africa, manifesting in global displays of solidarity and streets named in his honor.

== Early life and background ==
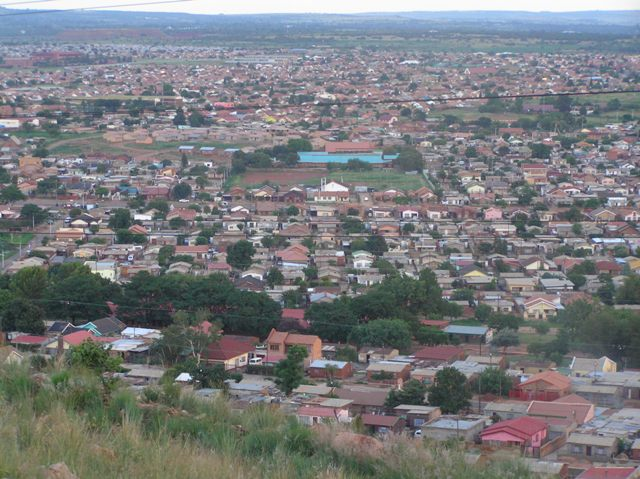
Phillipus Selepe was murdered in the Mamelodi township.

Malesela Benjamin Moloise was born to Pauline and Robert Moloise in 1955. He worked as an upholsterer in Soweto, later turning to poetry and religion while on death row for two years. Moloise also fathered two children.

On 7 November 1982, Warrant Officer Phillipus Selepe, a black security policeman who had been instrumental in capturing three African National Congress (ANC) members, was fatally ambushed at his home in Mamelodi. Selepe sustained eight gunshot wounds from an AK-47 rifle, with 25 spent cartridges found near his body. Moloise was arrested three months later; following two days of interrogations, he confessed to Selepe's murder.

During the apartheid era, black police officers thought to be cooperating with the South African government faced significant risks, becoming frequent targets for the ANC. These officers lived in areas where mistrust and accusations of betrayal were common sentiments. The South African government, while readily tapping into the talents and expertise of black citizens, often hesitated to ensure their protection, especially when such measures seemed at odds with the deeply entrenched apartheid principles. Reflecting a strategic shift, the ANC had recently expanded its focus to not only strike at military and economic establishments but also civilians. This change in tactics stemmed from the ANC's growing frustration with the loss of their members to South African law enforcement, leading to them announcing: "No longer will they do all the killing, while we do all the suffering."

== Trial ==
Flag of the African National Congress

During the trial, the prosecution alleged that Moloise's motivation for killing Selepe was revenge. The policeman had previously provided testimony that contributed to the conviction and subsequent execution of three ANC members on charges of treason. Despite initially confessing, Moloise retracted his admission during the trial.

ANC officials asserted Moloise's innocence, suggesting that an ANC guerilla firing squad was responsible for Selepe's death. The evidence, including 25 spent cartridges, appeared to align with the ANC's account, suggesting multiple gunmen rather than a lone assassin. However, Moloise's subsequent testimonies during the hearing cast doubt on his own defence. He claimed that the ANC had presented him with an ultimatum: to assassinate Selepe or face death himself. Reflecting on his decision, he stated, "I chose, and chose wrongly". Later, he modified his testimony, stating that while he was involved in plotting the murder, he did not actively partake in the act.

Priscilla Jana, the lawyer representing Moloise, highlighted significant discrepancies during his trial. She alleged that Moloise had been coerced into writing a confession while enduring a phase of solitary confinement. Jana further added that Moloise was pressed to enter an official plea on the murder charge before consulting his legal team and required to outline his defence strategy without their direction. Moloise would be convicted of murder by the Transvaal Supreme Court in September 1983.

== United Nations resolution ==
On 15 January 1984, the United Nations Security Council convened briefly to pass United Nations Security Council Resolution 547, which urged South Africa to grant clemency to Moloise. The African nations on the Security Council were eager to formalise a plea to spare Moloise's life. While not all nations shared equal enthusiasm for the proposal, the majority assented to a Security Council session. Scheduled for 11 a.m., the meeting commenced late, a common occurrence. Delegates leisurely entered, showing little urgency regarding their advocacy for Moloise, especially since the meeting's outcomes had already been decided. By 11:30, a third of the Security Council members were present, and by 11:45, more delegates had joined, engaging in small group discussions.

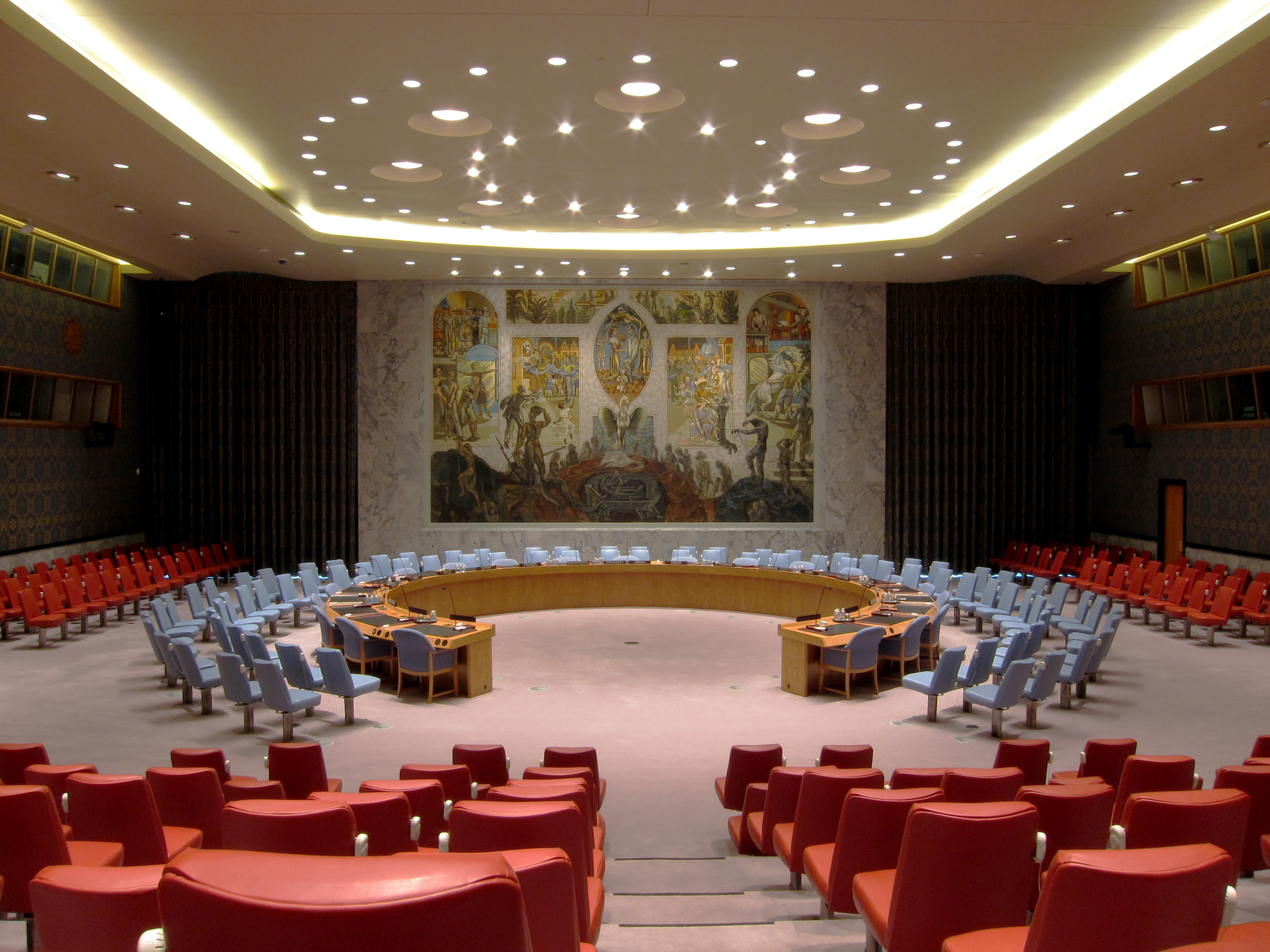
The UNSC unanimously passed a resolution condemning Moloise's hanging.

There was an evident tension between the African nations' urgency to highlight Moloise's looming execution, viewing it as an extension of South Africa's apartheid policies, and the Western preference to maintain a lower profile on the subject. Western representatives felt that the United Nations spent an excessive amount of time critiquing South Africa, often overshadowing numerous other pressing issues in Africa and beyond. A Western diplomat remarked that if they convened every time a policeman was killed in South Africa, "we would be meeting all the time". Western representatives also worried that excessive diplomatic attention might provoke South African authorities, potentially increasing the chances of Moloise's execution.

An hour behind schedule, the Security Council's 2,512th meeting commenced under the leadership of Javier Chamorro Mora from Nicaragua. By then, a consensus had been achieved. Western Council members consented to support a resolution, which, compared to other resolutions criticizing South Africa, was relatively moderate, urging for the commutation of Moloise's sentence. In return for Western support, African countries agreed not to deliver speeches during the session. This made the meeting one of the briefest in the Council's history, lasting under five minutes, with a unanimous 15-0 vote in favour of the resolution.

== Stay of execution ==
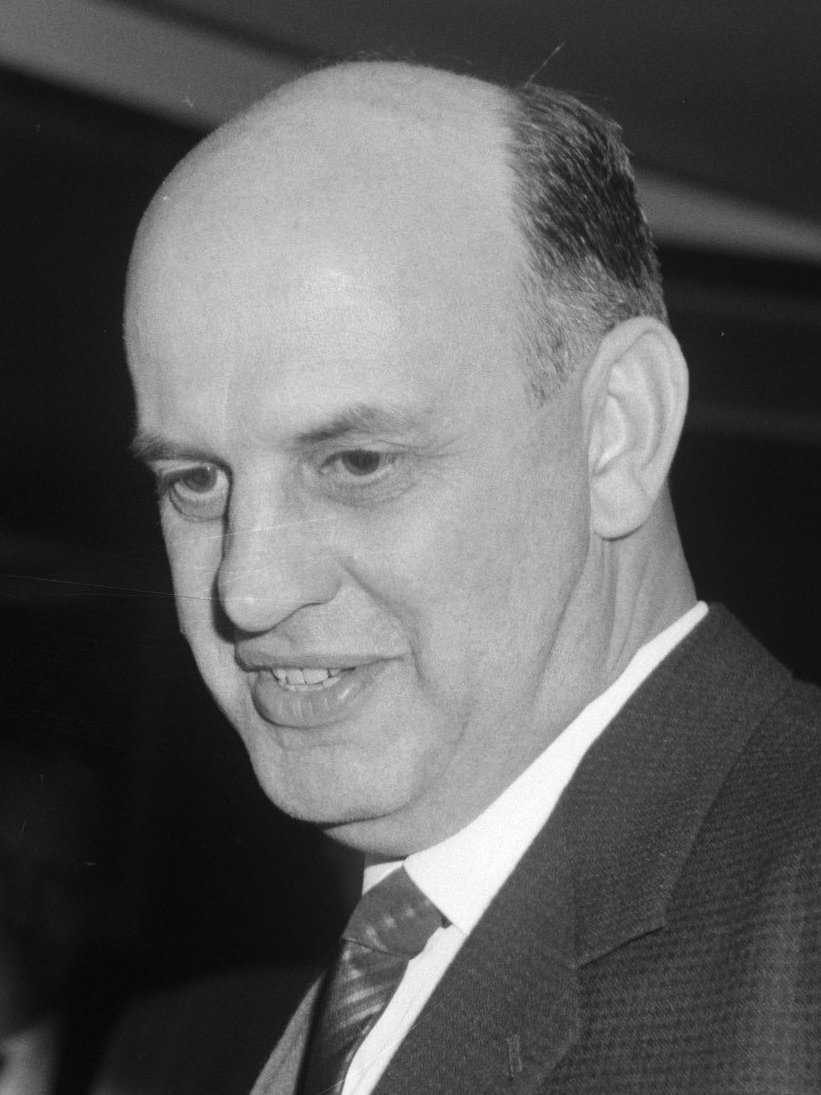
P. W. Botha declined a request for a retrial.

On 20 August 1985, the Transvaal Supreme Court in Pretoria granted Moloise a three-week stay of execution, a decision seemingly influenced by significant diplomatic pressures on the government. Just a week prior, President P. W. Botha had declined a clemency appeal. However, following the United States' diplomatic engagements with South African officials, defence attorneys were advised to promptly request an execution delay. The plea, lodged by lawyer Isaac Maisels and based on a sociologist's analysis of Moloise, was approved by Judge Eloff. While the judge was hesitant to set a precedent for last-minute stays, he recognized the merit of the application.

Moloise's mother, Pauline, appealed to the international community, particularly the U.S. and Britain, urging them to press the South African government to spare her son's life. She maintained his innocence, pointing to statements from the ANC's Zambia headquarters, which denied he was part of their hit squad that murdered the security policeman. This claim is notable since the ANC typically does not disavow its members when they are convicted. Following Mrs. Moloise's plea, Britain engaged with the South African Embassy in London and the Department of Foreign Affairs in Pretoria.

On 10 September, Priscilla Jana sought a retrial, but government officials informed her over a call that Botha had declined her request. Jana believed Botha's refusal was driven by political motivations and called upon the international community for support. In a subsequent press conference, she expressed her surprise at the president's decision, emphasising the presence of new evidence that might warrant a case review.

== Execution ==
All the armies that ever marched, all the parliaments that ever sat, have not affected the life of man on earth as that one solitary life… I am proud of what I am… The storm of oppression will be followed by the rain of my blood. I am proud to give my life, my one solitary life.

— Moloise's poem printed in the Weekly Mail.

On the night before Moloise's scheduled execution, soldiers surrounded and tear-gassed his mother's home in Soweto during a vigil, as reported by eyewitnesses. As global organizations and governments called for clemency for Moloise, around 300 youths had convened at Pauline Moloise's home. Priscilla Jana stated she had visited the house with Pauline, only to find an instruction for her and Robert Moloise to visit the local police station. As they attempted to contact authorities, they observed soldiers in armored vehicles encircling the house and ordering the protesting youths to leave. Despite Jana's assurances of the vigil's peaceful nature, the military remained unyielding, illuminating the vicinity with bright searchlights and declaring the assembly unlawful through loudspeakers. Earlier, Pauline, after her final meeting with her son, conveyed his message: the belief that South Africa will one day be governed by its black population, and that those sacrificing their lives are doing so for freedom. Pauline also stated that Moloise would walk to the gallows singing a song honoring the African National Congress and its exiled leader, Oliver Tambo.

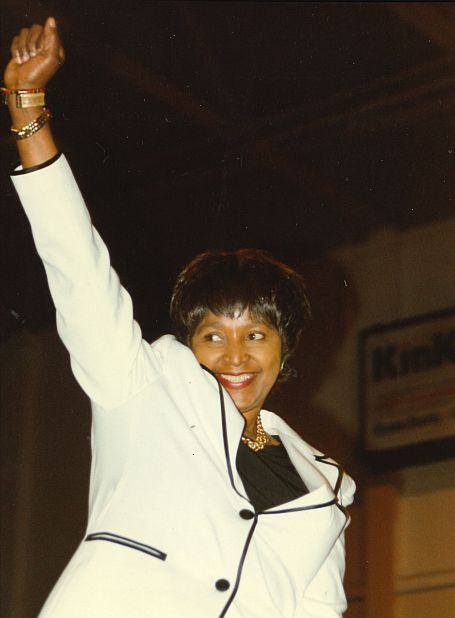
Winnie Mandela spoke at Moloise's memorial service.

Moloise was executed at Pretoria Central Prison around 7 a.m. on 18 October 1985. His parents waited in a car across the street until they were informed of their son's death, with no significant crowds or vigils marking the event. Reflecting on the ordeal and the treatment by the prison staff, Pauline Moloise lamented the government's cruelty. Moloise was hanged alongside another convicted murderer, Thembinkosi Ngubuane. Despite their grief, the Moloise family were not allowed to sing traditional funeral dirges during their prayer in the prison chapel. Moloise's parents sang the ANC anthem, Nkosi Sikelel' iAfrika, in the parking lot and displayed a black power salute. They were then permitted inside to pray beside their son's coffin. Pauline mentioned that a prison warden commended her son's bravery but did not confirm if he had sung, as she believed he would, on his way to the gallows. The prison authorities declined to hand over Moloise's body to his family, instead opting for a burial in a government cemetery, with Pauline instructed to return later to receive the grave's location.

At Moloise's memorial service, Winnie Mandela defiantly addressed the crowd, despite being prohibited from speaking at public events. At the time, her husband, ANC leader Nelson Mandela, was imprisoned for life on charges of treason and sabotage. Mandela called for united action against the white-minority government, condemning its harsh segregation policies. She appealed for unity against the South African government, receiving enthusiastic responses of "Power!" and "Viva Mandela!" from the attendees.

== Reaction ==
In response to Moloise's execution, Direct Action bombed an office.

Approximately six hours following Moloise's execution, around 500 mourners gathered at the South African Council of Churches' headquarters in downtown Johannesburg for a memorial service. Subsequently, they spilled into the streets, with some holding signs bearing the message: "The struggle will go on, Ben". But in a display of frustrated anger, hundreds began to riot in Johannesburg for four hours. Amidst the chaos, a group cornered a young woman holding her baby, terrifying her by smashing a store window behind her with various objects. However, they did not harm the woman or her child. In another example, a middle-aged woman and a young boy were pursued and attacked by a group of people. They were kicked and punched until they fell. Seeking refuge in a grocery store, they escaped further harm. White merchants who tried to prevent looting were brutally beaten, and police faced attacks, with one officer stabbed in the shoulder. Despite the violence, no white people were killed. What started as a protest by a small group of black mourners swelled as thousands joined in. Police efforts, even with the use of dogs, proved ineffective due to being heavily outnumbered. Ultimately, it was the army's intervention that dispersed the crowd. Significantly, this marked the first instance where black people confronted the police in an area considered white territory.

In Britain, thousands participated in a sit-in outside of the South African Embassy in London, protesting against apartheid. Their actions, which included throwing bottles and paint, led to major traffic disruptions. Over 300 participants were detained. The demonstrators expressed their opposition towards the South African government and disrupted traffic around Trafalgar Square for several hours. In Paris, an explosion occurred at the offices of two companies that had ties with South Africa. The extremist group, Direct Action, took responsibility for the attack, citing it as a reaction to Moloise's execution. The French airline UTA and the Chargeurs Reunis shipping firm suffered significant damages due to the explosion.

=== Foreign government reaction ===
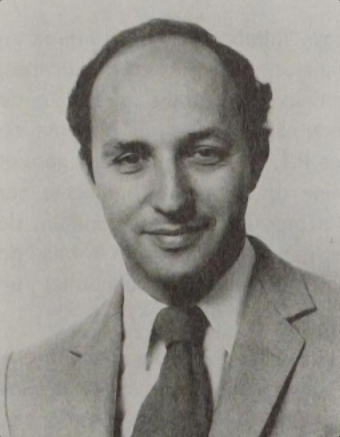
French Prime Minister Laurent Fabius observed a minute of silence in front of the South African Embassy.

The White House criticized the execution, noting that the U.S. government had "made a number of appeals for clemency” that were ignored. White House Press Secretary Larry Speakes stated, "We want to see tensions reduced and confidence restored in South Africa", expressing regret that an action that could "exacerbate this situation" took place. Similarly, the Soviet Union voiced its strong denunciation of the execution. However, the Soviets insinuated U.S. complicity, suggesting that without U.S. backing of the South African government, such an execution might not have taken place. The Soviet Union's state-run news agency, TASS, declared, "South African authorities have again demonstrated to the whole world that they will resort to any crime in order to prolong the racist domination."

The Nordic countries, during a meeting in Oslo, condemned the execution carried out by South Africa. As a response, they introduced sanctions against South Africa that impacted trade, transportation, and investment. The ministers from Denmark, Finland, Iceland, Norway, and Sweden jointly stated that the execution disregarded humanitarian concerns and would escalate political tension.

In Brussels, the European Community's External Affairs Commissioner, Willy De Clercq, expressed that Pretoria missed a chance for dialogue. He warned that their dismissal of global appeals might intensify violence, primarily affecting those demanding basic rights. In France, Prime Minister Laurent Fabius expressed his protest against the execution by observing a minute of silence in front of the South African Embassy in Paris. The West German government in Bonn denounced the hanging, fearing it would harm the prospects of peaceful apartheid reform. The Dutch government expressed deep regret over South Africa's failure to respond to the EEC's plea for clemency.

== Legacy ==
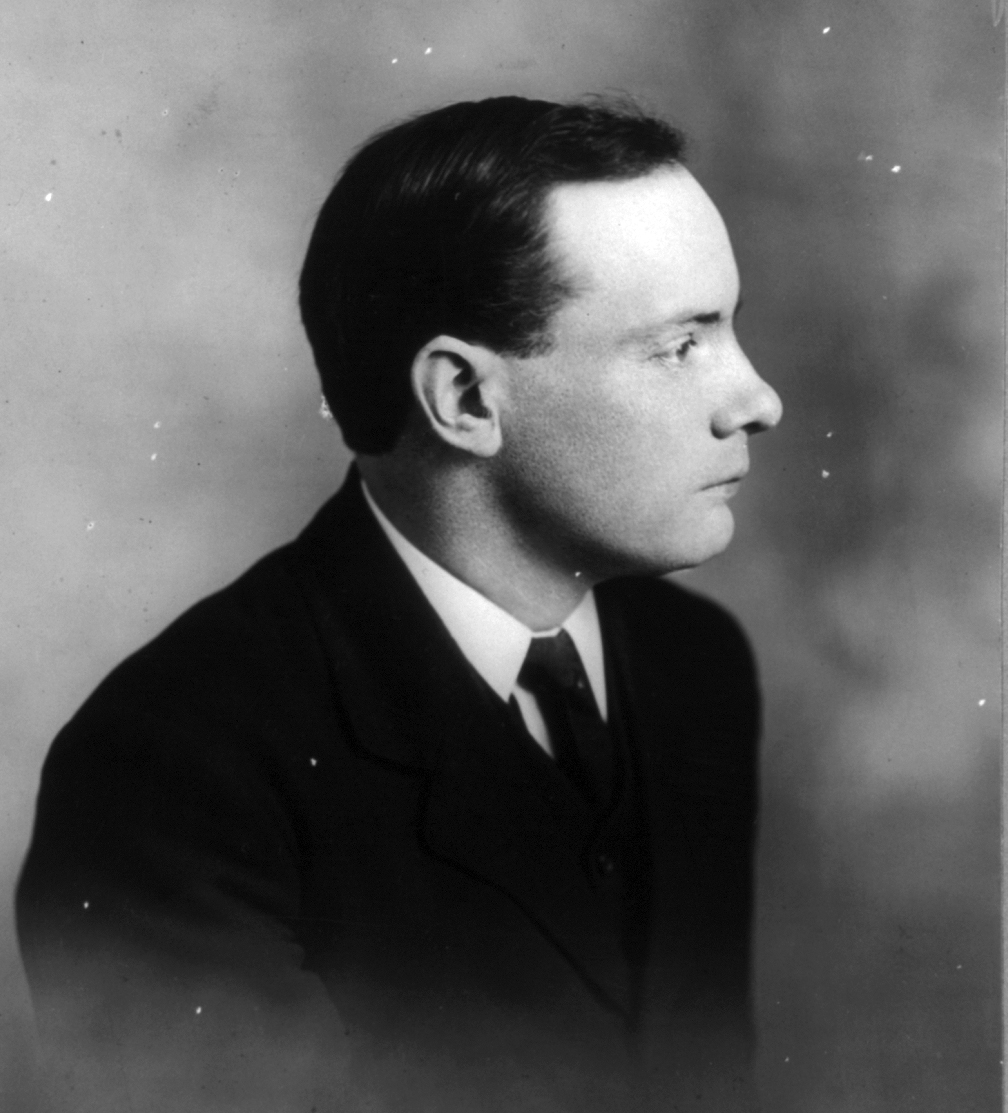
Irish poet Desmond Egan compares Moloise with Irish nationalist Patrick Pearse (pictured).

Following Moloise's execution in 1985, streets in Italy and France were named in his honor. However, in contemporary South Africa, his legacy is not widely remembered, with limited photographs of him available. Images from protests against his execution have been vital in keeping his memory alive around the world. In 2015, the online newspaper TheJournal.ie featured an article with a short documentary about Moloise's execution. The documentary includes footage of a post-execution press conference where Pauline Moloise sings the banned resistance song "Oliver Tambo", which Moloise had planned to sing before his execution. The video also shows Pauline and other mourners singing the Southern African liberation anthem "Nkosi Sikelel' iAfrika", reflecting the intense grief and emotional atmosphere of the apartheid era.

In Desmond Egan's poem "For Benjamin Moloise," he contrasts the vocal grief of South African mourners to the silent mourning of the global community. The poem draws a parallel between Moloise and Patrick Pearse, an Irish nationalist and poet executed in 1916. Egan emphasizes shared sorrow and unity against oppression with lines such as "your death now our bereavement" and the recurring sentiment "so that when they hanged you we all became black". Critics claim that Egan's poem, while expressing solidarity with Moloise, risks oversimplifying and appropriating experiences he has not lived. By equating Moloise's plight as a black individual under apartheid with broader struggles, the poem might unintentionally diminish the unique challenges of apartheid and use them to bolster Irish nationalism.

== Literature ==
Ashik, Ritu (1990). Benjamin Moloise. Teshro Vishwa Weekly Publication. OL 1375777M.
