= Sharpeville Six =

Convicted South African protesters

The Sharpeville Six were six South African protesters convicted of the murder of Deputy Mayor of Sharpeville, Kuzwayo Jacob Dlamini, and sentenced to death.

== History ==
On September 3, 1984, a protest march in Sharpeville against the National Party-led government over apartheid turned violent (some of the crowd threw stones at Dlamini's house, he responded by firing a gun and a riot ensued) and the Deputy Mayor was murdered. Mojalefa Sefatsa, Theresa Ramashamola, Reid Mokoena, Oupa Diniso, Duma Khumalo and Francis Don Mokhesi were arrested in the following months, found guilty of murder under the "Common purpose" doctrine and sentenced to death by hanging on December 12, 1985. Christian Mokubung and Gideon Mokone were also sentenced to eight years in prison. All were represented by lawyer Prakash Diar.

The convictions were widely condemned by the international community as unlawful and racist, particularly in United Nations Security Council Resolution 610 and 615. Two jurists reviewing the case said it was a "crime against humanity". Within the South African legal community opinion was mixed. A poll by The Star of eleven law professors showed that five were supportive of the execution, while six were not – of the six who were not, four raised the prospect of legal reforms and the remaining two remarked the case "smacks of simple vengeance". One professor was dispatched to London to defend the South African government's position on the matter. However, at a press conference, he stated he had not read the trial record but insisted that there had been no miscarriage of justice and "all arguments had been heard".

The following day after Security Council Resolution 610 was adopted, a South African court granted a one-month stay of execution. Of the six, only four appealed and the other two indicated they would rather be executed. The appeal was rejected in June 1988, which the Security Council condemned in Resolution 615; however pressure from abroad finally led to the sentences of all six being commuted to 18–25 years in prison by State President Pieter Willem Botha.

With the fall of apartheid, the first members of the Sharpeville Six, Diniso and Khumalo, were released on July 10, 1991, followed by Ramashamola and Mokoena on December 13, 1991, and the final two, Mokhesi and Sefatsa released on September 26, 1992.

== See also ==
- Internal resistance to South African apartheid
- Sharpeville massacre in 1960
- South Africa under apartheid
