= Boipatong =

- Location within Gauteng Location within South Africa
- Coordinates: 26°40′S 27°51′E
- Country: South Africa
- Province: Gauteng
- District: Sedibeng
- Municipality: Emfuleni
- Established: 1955

Area
  - Total: 4.31 km^{2} (1.66 sq mi)

Population (2011)
  - Total: 22,168
  - Density: 5,140/km^{2} (13,300/sq mi)

Racial makeup (2011)
  - Black African: 99.3%
  - Coloured: 0.3%
  - Indian/Asian: 0.1%
  - White: 0.1%
  - Other: 0.2%

First languages (2011)
  - Sotho: 53.1%
  - Xhosa: 15.6%
  - Zulu: 14.5%
  - Northern Sotho: 4.8%
  - Other: 12.0%
- Time zone: UTC+2 (SAST)
- Postal code (street): 1911
- PO box: 1901

Boipatong is a township in Gauteng, South Africa. It was established in 1955 to house black residents who worked in Vanderbijlpark and Vereeniging.

Boipatong means "the place of hiding" in the Sesotho language. Boipatong's expansion took place in tandem with the growth of Afrikaner Nationalism and the South African discrimination policy called apartheid.

Boipatong, along with other surrounding townships, served as a pool of cheap labour for steel industry giant ISCOR. ISCOR was built mainly as part of job creation and poverty eradication for the white working class. Although small, Boipatong was one of the places where the anger of the black people was felt during the marches of the 1960s against the requirement that they carry passes.

== Boipatong massacre ==
The township was the site of the infamous Boipatong massacre on 17 June 1992, when 46 township residents were massacred by local hostel-dwellers. The massacre took place while the Convention for a Democratic South Africa (CODESA) negotiations towards the end of apartheid in South Africa were in progress; the killings were one of the factors that led to suspension of the talks. The African National Congress (ANC) National Working Committee released a statement that it could not negotiate in conditions where the poor majority was being killed by state-sponsored violence. The ANC subsequently withdrew from the talks, only to return after then-President F.W. de Klerk committed to controlling his security forces, two years after Nelson Mandela's release. The talks were attended by 228 delegates from 19 political parties.

Further investigation from the Truth and Reconciliation Commission (TRC) confirmed that the massacre was state-sponsored. The hostel dwellers who killed the residents were Inkatha Freedom Party (IFP) members who later confessed to the TRC that they had been transported by government police vehicles and led by white police officers who painted their faces black. This massacre was added to a US lawsuit against multinational corporations that did business with the apartheid regime in South Africa.

== Boipatong Heritage Site ==
A Boipatong Memorial and Youth Heritage Centre dedicated to freedom struggle veterans was being built and completed on 29 October 2015 by Gauteng premier, David Makhura. The center was commissioned at a cost of 40 million rand by the Gauteng Province's former Department of Public Works, Roads and Transport, now the Department of Infrastructure Development (DID). The private sector contributed a larger portion of the amount, R40 million, including a consortium responsible for the construction of Gautrain. The memorial center construction created a number of jobs and provided skills training to members of the community.

== Corruption ==
In August 2025, ActionSA laid a criminal complaint following the expenditure of R28 million on an old-age home in Boipatong, which remained incomplete ten years later. The project was initially implemented by the Emfuleni Local Municipality before being transferred to the Gauteng Provincial Government.
