= United Nations Security Council Resolution 765 =

UN Security Council Resolution 765
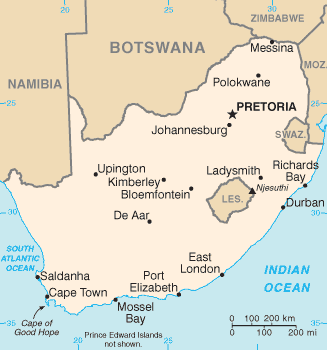
- South Africa
- Date: 16 July 1992
- Meeting no.: 3,096
- Code: S/RES/765 (Document)
- Subject: South Africa
- Voting summary: 15 voted for; None voted against; None abstained
- Result: Adopted

Security Council composition
- Permanent members: China; France; Russia; United Kingdom; United States
- Non-permanent members: Austria; Belgium; Cape Verde; Ecuador; Hungary; India; Japan; Morocco; Venezuela; Zimbabwe

United Nations Security Council resolution 765, adopted on 16 July 1992, after recalling resolutions 392 (1976), 473 (1980), 554 (1984) and 556 (1984), the council condemned the escalating violence in South Africa, in particular the Boipatong massacre on 17 June 1992, which resulted in the deaths of 46 people, and the suspension by the African National Congress (ANC) of bilateral talks with the South African government.

The resolution urged the South African authorities to bring an end to the violence and those responsible for the shooting of demonstrators to justice. It also called on upon the parties concerned to ensure the implementation of the National Peace Accord.

The council went on to invite the Secretary-General Boutros Boutros-Ghali to appoint a special representative of South Africa in order to recommend, after negotiations with the ANC, other parties and the South African government, a series of measures that could bring about an end to the political violence in the country and would lead to a transition to a democratic, non-racist, South Africa. The special representative, Cyrus Vance, visited South Africa from 21 to 31 July 1992, and the secretary-general reported to the council on 7 July 1992, leading to the adoption of Resolution 772.

== See also ==
- Internal resistance to South African apartheid
- List of United Nations Security Council Resolutions 701 to 800 (1991–1993)
- Negotiations to end apartheid in South Africa
- South Africa under apartheid
