= United Nations Observer Mission in South Africa =

United Nations peacekeeping mission to South Africa from 1992–94

- Abbreviation: UNOMSA
- Formation: 17 August 1992
- Dissolved: 27 June 1994
- Headquarters: Johannesburg, South Africa
- Parent organization: United Nations Security Council

The United Nations Observer Mission in South Africa (UNOMSA) was a United Nations peacekeeping mission to South Africa from 1992 to 1994. The mission was led by Angela King and was headquartered in Johannesburg, with a regional office in Durban.

== History ==
=== Establishment ===
The United Nations Observer Mission in South Africa was established on 17 August 1992 by United Nations Security Council Resolution 772. The first 13 observers arrived in South Africa on 13 September.

On 14 January 1994, United Nations Security Council Resolution 894 expanded the role of the mission to include election monitoring.

The mission ended on 27 June 1994.

== Budget ==
From 1994 to 1995, the United States contributed US$6,336,200 to the mission.

== Bibliography ==
- Ndulo, Muna (1995). "United Nations Observer Mission in South Africa (UNOMSA): Security Council Resolutions 772 (1992) and 894 (1994) and the South African Transition: Preventive Diplomacy and Peacekeeping". African Yearbook of International Law. 3 (1): 205–238. doi:10.1163/221161795X00105. ISSN 2211-6176.
- United Nations (1994). The United Nations and Apartheid: 1948-1994. New York: United Nations Department of Public Information. ISBN 978-92-1-100546-2. OCLC 1036963820.
