= United Nations Security Council Resolution 772 =

UN Security Council Resolution 772
- Flag of South Africa (1928–1994)
- Date: 17 August 1992
- Meeting no.: 3,107
- Code: S/RES/772 (Document)
- Subject: South Africa
- Voting summary: 15 voted for; None voted against; None abstained
- Result: Adopted

Security Council composition
- Permanent members: China; France; Russia; United Kingdom; United States
- Non-permanent members: Austria; Belgium; Cape Verde; Ecuador; Hungary; India; Japan; Morocco; Venezuela; Zimbabwe

United Nations Security Council resolution 772, adopted unanimously on 17 August 1992, after recalling Resolution 765 (1992) concerning the Boipatong massacre in South Africa and a report from the Secretary-General, the Council authorised Boutros Boutros-Ghali to deploy observers to the country after concerns raised in the report, known as the United Nations Observer Mission in South Africa.

The Secretary-General's proposals included the deployment of observers to strengthen mechanisms established in the National Peace Accord. The observers would be stationed in agreed locations across South Africa. If necessary, the Observer Mission could be supplemented by appropriate international organisations such as the Organisation of African Unity, the Commonwealth and European Community. 50 observers were dispatched by September.

The Council requested the Secretary-General to report quarterly or more frequently on the implementation of the current resolution, and asked for the full co-operation of the Government of South Africa, parties and organisations.

== See also ==
- Internal resistance to South African apartheid
- List of United Nations Security Council Resolutions 701 to 800 (1991–1993)
- Negotiations to end apartheid in South Africa
- Apartheid
