= United Nations Security Council Resolution 525 =

UN Security Council Resolution 525
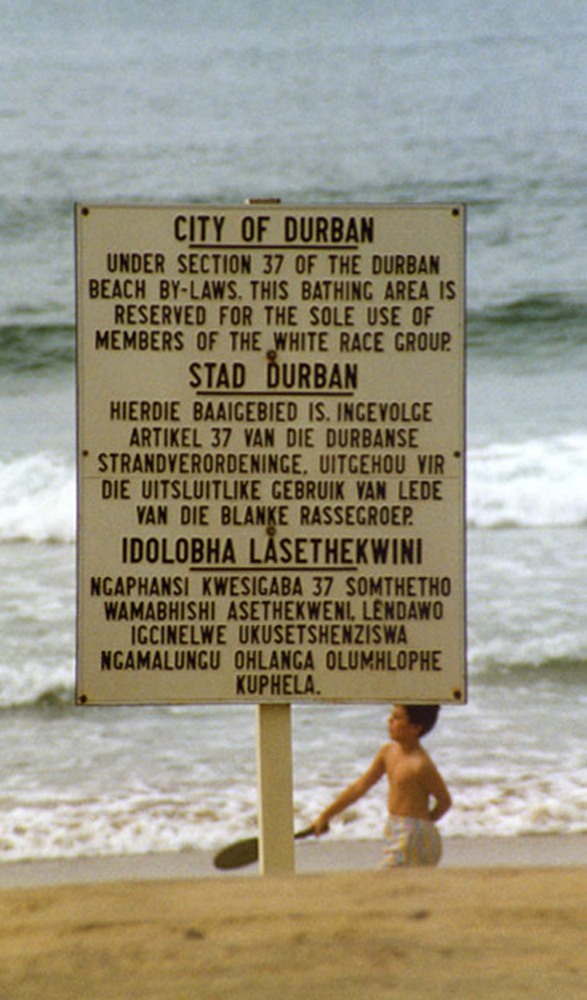
- Apartheid-era sign (1989)
- Date: 7 December 1982
- Meeting no.: 2,404
- Code: S/RES/525 (Document)
- Subject: South Africa
- Voting summary: 15 voted for; None voted against; None abstained
- Result: Adopted

Security Council composition
- Permanent members: China; France; Soviet Union; United Kingdom; United States
- Non-permanent members: Guyana; Ireland; Jordan; Japan; Panama; Poland; Spain; Togo; Uganda; Zaire

United Nations Security Council resolution 525, adopted unanimously on 7 December 1982, after hearing of the death sentences on Anthony Tsotsobe, Johannes Shabangu and David Moise, the Council expressed its concern at the sentences passed by the Supreme Court of Appeal of South Africa, in addition to those of Ncimbithi Johnson Lubisi, Petrus Tsepo Mashigo and Naphtali Manana, members of the African National Congress.

The resolution called on the South African authorities to commute the sentences, and to all other Member States to use their influence to save the lives of the six men.

== See also ==
- List of United Nations Security Council Resolutions 501 to 600 (1982–1987)
- Resolutions 503, 533 and 547
- Apartheid
