= United Nations Security Council Resolution 503 =

UN Security Council Resolution 503
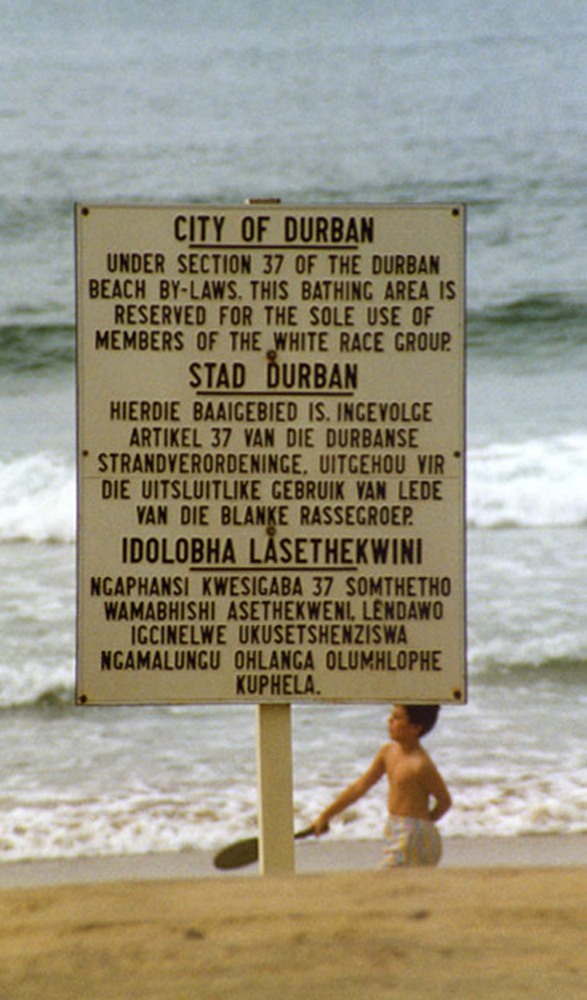
- Apartheid-era sign (1989)
- Date: 9 April 1982
- Meeting no.: 2,351
- Code: S/RES/503 (Document)
- Subject: South Africa
- Voting summary: 15 voted for; None voted against; None abstained
- Result: Adopted

Security Council composition
- Permanent members: China; France; Soviet Union; United Kingdom; United States
- Non-permanent members: Guyana; Ireland; Jordan; Japan; Panama; Poland; Spain; Togo; Uganda; Zaire

United Nations Security Council resolution 503, adopted unanimously on 9 April 1982, after reaffirming Resolution 473 (1980), the Council expressed its concern at the death sentences issued by the Transvaal Provincial Division of the Supreme Court of South Africa against Ncimbithi Johnson Lubisi, Petrus Tsepo Mashigo and Naphtali Manana, all of whom were members of the African National Congress.

The resolution called upon the Government of South Africa to commute the death sentences after hearing of the confirmation of them at the Appellate Division of the Supreme Court. It also urged all Member States to use their influence to assist in the matter.

After the adoption of Resolution 503, the death sentences of the men were commuted to life imprisonment; all were subsequently released during the fall of apartheid.

== See also ==
- List of United Nations Security Council Resolutions 501 to 600 (1982–1987)
- Resolutions 525, 533 and 547
- Apartheid
