= United Nations Security Council Resolution 533 =

UN Security Council Resolution 533
- Date: 7 June 1983
- Meeting no.: 2,452
- Code: S/RES/533 (Document)
- Subject: South Africa
- Voting summary: 15 voted for; None voted against; None abstained
- Result: Adopted

Security Council composition
- Permanent members: China; France; Soviet Union; United Kingdom; United States
- Non-permanent members: Guyana; Jordan; Malta; Netherlands; Nicaragua; Pakistan; Poland; Togo; Zaire; Zimbabwe

United Nations Security Council resolution 533, adopted unanimously on 7 June 1983, after reaffirming Resolution 525 (1982), the Council expressed its concern at the death sentences issued to Thelle Simon Mogoerane, Jerry Semano Mosololi and Marcus Thabo Motaung, all members of the African National Congress.

The resolution called upon the South African authorities to commute the sentences imposed on the men, and urged all other Member States and organisations to help save the lives of the men.

== See also ==
- List of United Nations Security Council Resolutions 501 to 600 (1982–1987)
- Resolutions 503, 525 and 547
- Apartheid

== Notes ==
- Text of the Resolution at undocs.org
