= United Nations Security Council Resolution 547 =

UN Security Council Resolution 547
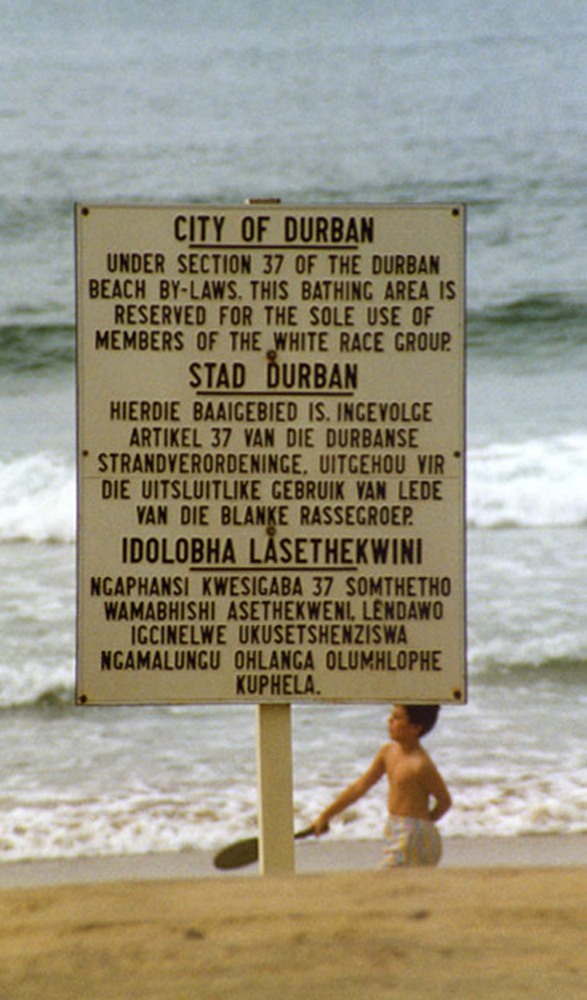
- Apartheid-era sign (1989)
- Date: 13 January 1984
- Meeting no.: 2,512
- Code: S/RES/547 (Document)
- Subject: South Africa
- Voting summary: 14 voted for; None voted against; 1 abstained
- Result: Adopted

Security Council composition
- Permanent members: China; France; Soviet Union; United Kingdom; United States
- Non-permanent members: Egypt; India; Malta; Netherlands; Nicaragua; Pakistan; Peru; Ukrainian SSR; Upper Volta; Zimbabwe

United Nations Security Council resolution 547, adopted unanimously on 13 January 1984, after reaffirming previous resolutions on the topic, the Council expressed its concern at the death sentences issued to Malesela Benjamin Maloise, a member of the African National Congress.

The resolution called upon the South African authorities to commute the sentences imposed on Mr Maloise, and urged all other Member States and organisations to help save the life of the man. The resolution passed fourteen votes in favour, with none against, and only France abstained.

Maloise, a black poet, was convicted of murdering a policeman. Despite a court ruling that Maloise was under heavy psychological pressure at the time, President Pieter Willem Botha ordered his execution. On 18 October 1985, Maloise was hanged in Pretoria Central Prison.

== See also ==
- List of United Nations Security Council Resolutions 501 to 600 (1982–1987)
- Resolutions 503, 525 and 533
- South Africa under apartheid
