= Boipatong massacre =

1992 massacre in South Africa

Coordinates: 26°39′49″S 27°51′00″E

- Boipatong (South Africa)
- Location: Boipatong, South Africa
- Date: 17 June 1992; 34 years ago
- Deaths: 45
- Perpetrator: Supporters of the Inkatha Freedom Party

The Boipatong massacre took place on the night of 17 June 1992 in the township of Boipatong, South Africa.

== Massacre ==
The attack on township residents was carried out by armed men from the steelworks residence KwaMadala Hostel, which is located about 1 km from the township. Forty-five people died and several were maimed.

The attackers were 200 supporters of the Inkatha Freedom Party (IFP), rival party of the African National Congress (ANC). At the time, the South African government and several other political groups were negotiating in the Convention for a Democratic South Africa (CODESA) talks. Shortly after the massacre, it was claimed by members of the African National Congress that the South African Police in cooperation with the IFP had organised the raid, and the ANC consequently stepped out of the negotiations. It was also suggested that the raid formed part of the activities of the South African Defence Force's Operation Marion. Witnesses said that the men had arrived in police vehicles, supporting such claims that elements within the police and army contributed to the ongoing violence. The ANC resumed negotiations shortly after the Bisho massacre of 7 September 1992.

When de Klerk visited the scene of the incident he was initially warmly welcomed, but he was suddenly confronted by a crowd of protesters brandishing stones and placards. The motorcade sped from the scene as police tried to hold back the crowd. Shots were fired by the police, and the PAC stated that three of its supporters had been gunned down.

The massacre was mentioned in the United Nations Security Council Resolution 765 of 16 July 1992.

Subsequent judicial inquiries found the evidence of the witnesses that the men arrived in police vehicles to be unreliable or discredited, and that there was no evidence of National Party or police involvement in the massacre. A criminal trial held in 1993, which included testimony of 120 Boipatong residents, convicted IFP supporters of crimes in the massacre, but ruled that the police had played no part in it. The Truth and Reconciliation Commission (TRC) concluded in 1998 that the police were in fact involved in the raid, but the TRC's Amnesty Committee found in 2000 that the police were not involved after all.

The Boipatong massacre offered the ANC a pretext to engage in brinkmanship. Mandela argued that de Klerk, as head of state, was responsible for bringing an end to the bloodshed. He also accused the South African police of inciting the ANC-IFP violence. This formed the basis for ANC's withdrawal from the negotiations to end apartheid, and the CODESA forum broke down completely at this stage.

== Further controversy ==
In an interview with journalist Rian Malan in October 1998, Sergeant Gerhardus "Pedro" Peens, who claimed not to have been in Boipatong at the time of the massacre, admitted to being in Boipatong investigating a murder, driving a Casspir, but claimed that he had left prior to the massacre. Peens had previously denied having been at Boipatong in a Casspir at all. Peens' statement was later considered by the TRC in their investigations. Peen's admission was prompted by the application for amnesty by sixteen Inkatha Freedom Party members for their part in the Boipatong massacre.

The Goldstone Commission appointed Peter Waddington to make an independent enquiry. His report was released on 22 July 1992. It stated that there was no evidence of police collusion in the killings.

== See also ==
- List of massacres in South Africa
