= M11 (Johannesburg) =

Road in Johannesburg, South Africa

Metropolitan route M11

Route information
- Maintained by Johannesburg Roads Agency and Gauteng Department of Roads and Transport
- Length: 30 km (19 mi)
- Existed: 1880s–present

Major junctions
- South end: M95 Bellairs Road, Bassonia

- N12 Southern Bypass, Bassonia M38 Verona Drive, Rosettenville M34 Turf Club Street, Rosettenville; N17 Wemmer Pan; M2 Francois Oberholzer Freeway, Marshalltown; R29 Marshall/Anderson Street, Marshalltown; R24 Albertina Sisulu Road/Commissioner Street, Johannesburg CBD; M10 Smit Street, Hillbrow; M18 Kotze Drive, Hillbrow; M71 Empire Road, Parktown; M31 Houghton Drive, Houghton; M31 Joe Slovo Drive, Berea; M16 1st Ave, Houghton; M16 8th St, Orange Grove; R25 11 Ave/Louis Road, Orchards; M20 Athol St, Highlands North; M30 Corlett Dr, Bramley; M40 Artwright Ave, Wynberg; M60 Marlboro Drive, Marlboro
- North end: R55 / R101 Woodmead Drive, Woodmead / Old Pretoria Road

Location
- Country: South Africa

Highway system
- Numbered routes of South Africa
← M10	→ M13

M11 is a major metropolitan route in Greater Johannesburg, South Africa. Historically it was part of the main road between Johannesburg and Pretoria; it now runs through the central and north-eastern parts of the city from Bassonia, passing through Rosettenville, Johannesburg CBD and Hillbrow, passing through numerous older suburbs (including Houghton, Orange Grove and the Alexandra Township) as Louis Botha Avenue, before it becomes the Old Pretoria Road (R101) and continues to Midrand and Pretoria.

== Route ==
The M11 begins in the suburb of Bassonia (east of Glenvista) in Johannesburg South, at a junction with the M95 Bellairs Road. It heads north through Bassonia as Comaro Street to reach a junction with the N12 highway (Johannesburg Southern Bypass). Just after the N12, it enters the suburb of Oakdene as Oak Avenue, and after a tight curve around the estate houses of Oakdene, it proceeds northwards as Prairie Street, the main road of Rosettenville (meeting the M38 South Rand Road just after Oakdene and meeting the M34 Geranium Street by Rosettenville Junction Shopping Centre).

After meeting the M34, it is named Diagonal Street and proceeds in a northeasterly direction, dissecting the suburb of Regents Park (hence the name Diagonal Street). After bypassing the Regents Park Estate, it becomes Wemmer Pan Road and makes a loop around the Wemmer Pan to meet the western end of the N17 toll highway just east of the Springfield suburb. From the N17 junction, the M11 continues northwards to meet the M2 highway (Francois Oberholzer Freeway) (westbound only) as Mooi Street and enter the City and Suburban area of Johannesburg. As Mooi Street becomes a one-way street at its junction with the R29 road (Anderson Street; Marshall Street), the M11 joins the R29 westwards up to the junction with Von Wielligh Street in the suburb of Marshalltown, where the M11 resumes going northwards. Soon after, the M11 meets the two roads that form the R24 road (Albertina Sisulu Road and Commissioner Street) in the Johannesburg CBD.

By Lillian Ngoyi Street near the MTN North Taxi Rank, the M11 becomes Klein Street and continues northwards to pass through Joubert Park, where the Johannesburg Art Gallery is located. At the junction with the M10 road (Smit Street) (east of Johannesburg Park Station and east of Braamfontein), the M11 joins the M10 eastwards up to the next junction, where it enters the suburb of Hillbrow, returns to facing northwards and resumes being called Klein Street. By Hillbrow Police Station, it becomes Clarendon Place (forming the border between the Parktown and Berea suburbs), meeting the eastern end of Empire Road (M71 road), before becoming Willie Street. At the Houghton Drive (M31 road) off-ramp, the M11 becomes Louis Botha Avenue.

The M11 proceeds as Louis Botha Avenue, heading north-east, separating Houghton to the north from Yeoville and Bellevue to the south. In Houghton, it passes close to the private boy's schools of St John's College (1889) and King Edward VII school (1911). After this point, the road curves and is ominously nicknamed Deathbend due to the number of car accidents at the spot. Here the M16 1st Avenue in Houghton intersects this route from the west at a t-junction and is briefly co-signed. The route then enters the suburb of Orange Grove passing the new Victory Theatre (2007). Midway through Orange Grove, the road bends northwards and the M16 splits off to the east as 8th Street. The M11 passes through Orchards and is intersected by the R25 and then passes Sydenham and smaller suburbs of Maryvale, Forbesdale, Cheltondale, Rouxville and Hawkins Estate. The road then crosses the M20 at Atholl Road in the suburbs of Highlands North and Waverley. The road later crosses the M30 Corlett Drive in Bramley before reaching, a short distance later, the M40 Artwright Avenue in the light industrial suburb of Wynberg with the old township of Alexandra close by (to the east). The road continues north, now as the Pretoria Main Road, reaching the M60 Marlboro Drive intersection where the M1 De Villiers Graaff motorway can be accessed. Crossing the intersection, the M11 continues north parallel to the M1 on the left as the Eastern Service Road before reaching its end at an intersection with the R55 Woodmead Drive at Woodlands, near Woodmead. The road continues northwards as the R101 Old Pretoria Road to Midrand.
