= Johannesburg freeways =

Freeways of Johannesburg, South Africa

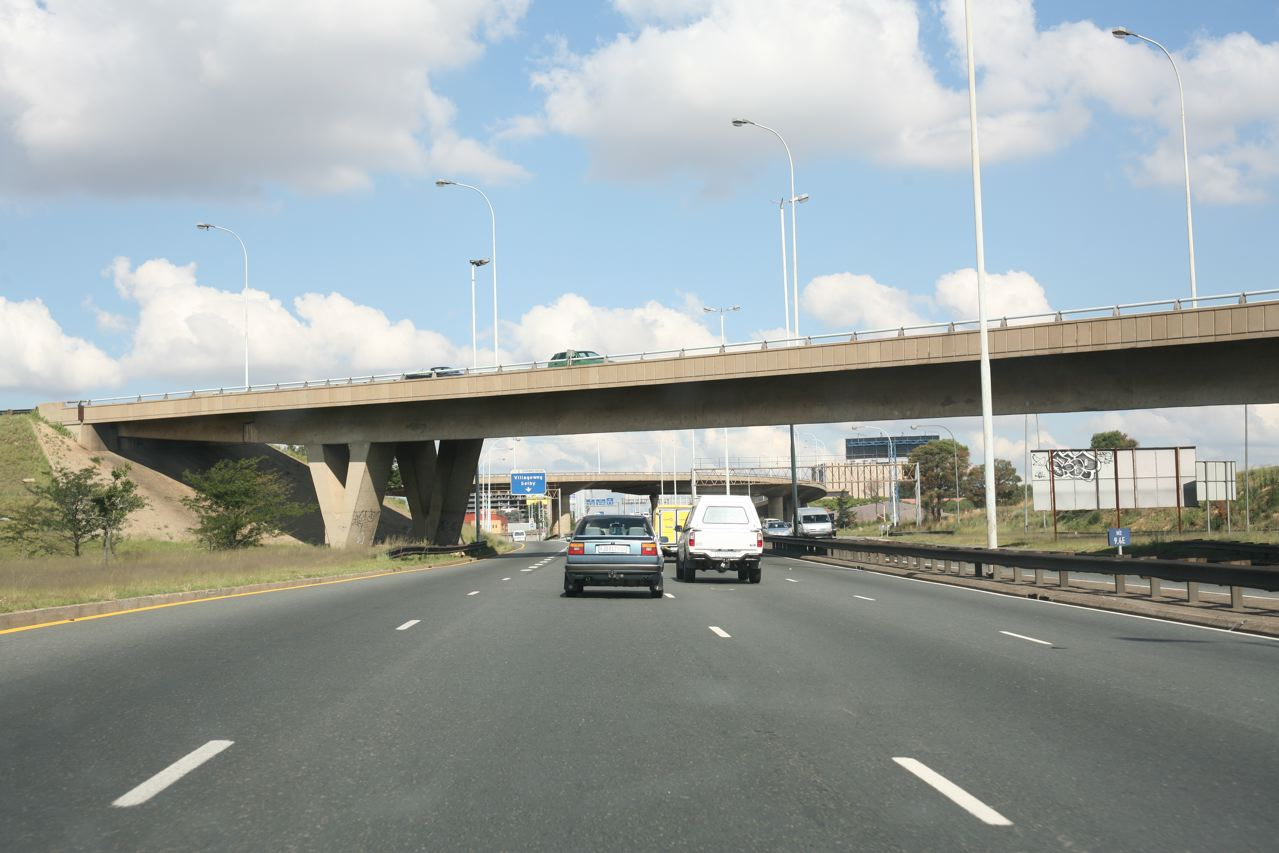
The M2 in the afternoon as it passes through the Central Business District.

Johannesburg is heavily dependent upon freeways for transport around the city due to its location 1,500 metres above sea level, far from the coast or any major bodies of water. There are 10 freeways in the Greater Johannesburg Metropolitan Area: the N1, N3, N12, N14, N17, R21, R24, R59, M1 and M2. In addition, three new freeways are planned: the G5, G9 and G14. Freeways are sometimes called highways or motorways colloquially.

The Johannesburg Ring Road that circles the city is formed by the N1 (Western Bypass), N3 (Eastern Bypass) and N12 (Southern Bypass). The N14 connects the West Rand with Pretoria. The N17 connects the Johannesburg Central Business District and southern parts of the city with Springs on the East Rand and the province of Mpumalanga. The R21 connects the East Rand and OR Tambo International Airport with Pretoria. The R24 connects central Johannesburg to the airport. The R59 connects Johannesburg with Vereeniging in the Vaal Triangle. The M1 runs the length of the city north–south, from Soweto to Buccleuch, where it becomes the N1. The Johannesburg-Pretoria highway is also called the Ben Schoeman Highway and is part of the N1. The M2 runs the length of the central part of the city east–west, from Germiston to Main Reef Road (R41 Road) in Crown, just south-west of the Johannesburg Central Business District.

The N1 (Ben Schoeman Highway) between Johannesburg and Pretoria is now becoming severely overloaded. Reports suggest that the road carries 180,000 vehicles a day between the two cities. The road is heavily congested as traffic enters Johannesburg in the mornings and leaves at night, as many people work in Johannesburg but live in Pretoria. As a result, the Gauteng Provincial Government has put in motion plans to alleviate heavy traffic congestion, which is likely to worsen. One plan that was partially completed before South Africa hosted the 2010 FIFA World Cup is the Gautrain: a rapid rail system with a north–south line between Johannesburg and Pretoria, and an east–west line between OR Tambo International Airport and Sandton. The east–west line opened in June 2010, just before the World Cup. The north–south line opened from Pretoria to Rosebank in August 2011; after delays caused by excessive water seepage in a major tunnel, the Rosebank–Johannesburg section opened in July 2012.

== Planned Freeways ==
The Star and Engineering News report that three new freeways have been planned for Johannesburg:

- The PWV9, linking the northern part of Johannesburg with the western part of Pretoria, aligned along the existing R80 axis known as the Mabopane Freeway. It will run parallel to the N1 and will intersect with the N14.
- The PWV5, which will link the R21 with the new PWV9, crossing the N1 at the Olifantsfontein interchange.
- The PWV14 will provide a new link between the existing M2 and OR Tambo International Airport via Germiston.

In addition, there were plans afoot to extend the N17 from its end in Johannesburg South, to Krugersdorp, which would have allowed motorists to traverse the metropolitan area in under an hour in free-flowing traffic.
