= Inner City, Johannesburg =

Human settlement in South Africa

The Inner City of Johannesburg, Gauteng Province, South Africa has a number of suburbs including Braamfontein, Braampark, Johannesburg CBD, Doornfontein, Hillbrow, Jeppestown, Joubert Park, City and Suburban, Marshalltown, Newtown, Berea and Yeoville, among others.

== Background ==
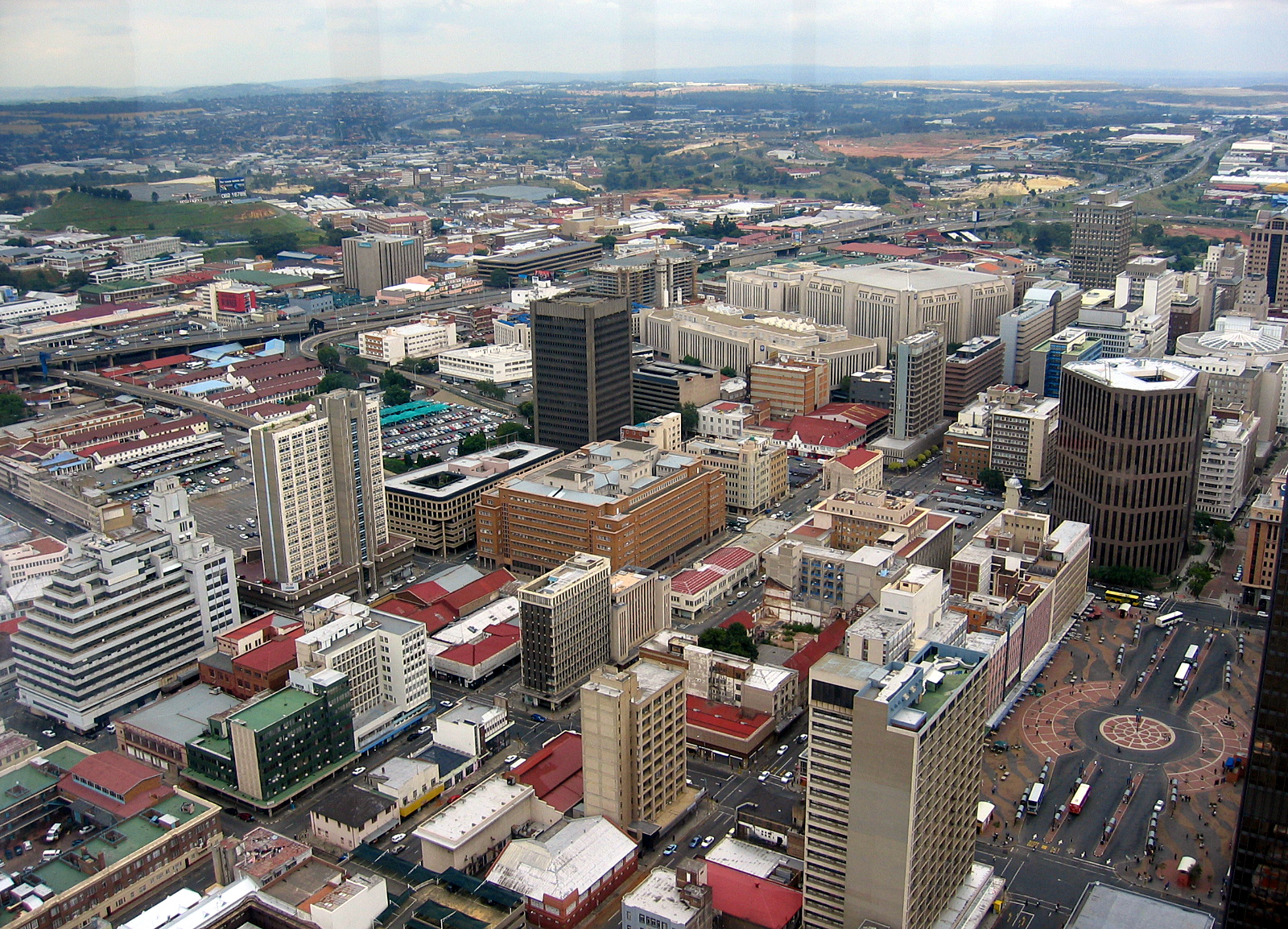
Marshalltown, as seen from the top of the Carlton Centre. The M1 and M2 run behind the buildings, and the southern suburbs extend past the highway boundary.

The inner city of Johannesburg is located within the municipality's Region F. The inner city is an extremely diverse region, with areas ranging from severely degraded residential areas such as Bertrams, to the somewhat stable commercial area of Braamfontein. The estimated population of the region is 200,000, but the number of people living in the inner city on an informal basis is unknown, as many are illegal immigrants. Most higher-income residents and white people have moved to the northern suburbs and have been replaced by lower-income black people. The unemployment, education, and age profiles of the area are all unknown, due to the difficulty of obtaining reliable information about the area. There have been significant movements to revitalise the CBD, most of which have focused on the reduction of crime, especially street crime in the central area, and the redevelopment of Newtown as a cultural hub for the city.

Centred on the CBD, the region includes the suburbs of Yeoville, Bellevue, Troyeville, Jeppestown, and Berea to the east. To the west it spreads to Pageview and Fordsburg. There are small industrial areas to the south, such as City West-Denver and Benrose.

Around 800,000 commuters pass through the inner city every day, and it functions as a regional shopping node for visitors from the southern suburbs. All major arterial roads originate from the inner city and spread out into other parts of the city. Johannesburg's main railway station, bus terminal, and minibus taxi centre are all located in the inner city.

The suburbs close to the CBD, in particular Joubert Park, Hillbrow, and Berea, have a large number of high-rise apartment blocks. These areas were formerly extremely desirable; however, due to the increase in crime, the housing stock has greatly deteriorated as many wealthier residents have left for the northern suburbs. The existing buildings in the CBD area are insufficient to meet the current demands for housing in the area, and as a result, many under-utilised or abandoned office buildings have been taken over by squatters, or converted into residential housing units. Yeoville and Bellevue have a mix of apartment buildings and single residential units on small lots.

The region is located on a mountainous divide that runs from east to west. The most conspicuous geographic feature is Observatory Ridge, which is named for the large observatory located on it. The recreational spaces are no longer used, due to security problems. The CBD area lacks open spaces; although there are small neighbourhood parks in all suburbs, they are also not used due to mugging concerns. Both the University of the Witwatersrand and the University of Johannesburg are located in the inner city. One of South Africa's leading sporting venues, Ellis Park Stadium, is located in Doornfontein. It serves as primary home of Jo'burg's two professional rugby union teams, the Lions in the Southern Hemisphere Super Rugby competition and the Golden Lions in the domestic Currie Cup. It was also a venue for the 2010 FIFA World Cup. Johannesburg Stadium, a training ground for both the Golden Lions and Orlando Pirates, is adjacent.
