= M34 (Johannesburg) =

Metropolitan route in the City of Johannesburg, South Africa

Metropolitan route M34

Route information
- Maintained by Johannesburg Roads Agency and Gauteng Department of Roads and Transport

Major junctions
- West end: M17 Ormonde
- M7 Robertsham M9 Turffontein; M11 Rewlatch M19 South Hills
- East end: M31 Elandspark

Location
- Country: South Africa

Highway system
- Numbered routes of South Africa
← M33	→ M35

The M34 is a short metropolitan route in Johannesburg, South Africa.

== Route ==
The M34 begins at the M17 and ends at the M31.
