= M17 (Johannesburg) =

Metropolitan route in Johannesburg, South Africa

Metropolitan route M17

Route information
- Maintained by Johannesburg Roads Agency and Gauteng Department of Roads and Transport
- Length: 15.9 mi (25.6 km)

Major junctions
- South end: N12 Southern Bypass, Winchester Hills Ext. 3
- M38 Rifle Range Road, Robertsham; M34 Northern Parkway, Ormonde Ext.; M1 Xavier Street, Robertsham; R41 Main Reef Road, Crown; R24 Albertina Sisulu Road, Mayfair; M10 Bartlett Way, Brixton; M18 Kingsway Avenue, Auckland Park
- North end: M7 / M71 Empire Road, Auckland Park

Location
- Country: South Africa

Highway system
- Numbered routes of South Africa
| ← M16 | → M18 |

The M17 is a metropolitan route in Johannesburg, South Africa. It runs north from the southern suburb of Ridgeway through Mayfair a suburb just west of the Johannesburg Central Business District and ends in the north in Auckland Park. It intersect two main Johannesburg freeways, starting with an intersection to the N12 Southern Bypass and the north–south M1 freeway.

== Route ==
The M17 has its southern terminus beginning as Xavier Street at an interchange with the N12 highway (Southern Bypass). It heads northwards to intersect the M38 Rifle Range Road. Passing the west end of the suburb of Robertsham, it crosses the old Kimberley Road and the on and off ramps of the north–south M1 freeway (De Villiers Graaff Motorway). After passing over the freeway, it becomes Crownwood Road through Evans Park, reaching a junction with the M34 Northern Parkway in Ormonde (just west of Gold Reef City) before continuing northwards through the old mining lands of Crown Mines and the suburb of Theta. There it crosses under the M70 Soweto Highway without any intersections. Passing the old Langlaagte Deep Village, it intersects the east–west R41 Main Reef Road in the suburb of Crown and continues north as Church Street into Mayfair.

Here in Mayfair, it intersects the east–west R24 Albertina Sisulu Road. It continues north briefly as Church Street before turning left into Queens Road before turning right again and intersecting and co-signing briefly with the M10 Bartlett Road. Resuming a northward direction as Brixton Road, it passes the Brixton Cemetery to its east before becoming Symons Road. It passes the Brixton Tower in Brixton and becomes Henley Road in Auckland Park, passing the SABC broadcast centre. Shortly thereafter it intersects the M18 Kingsway Avenue and becomes co-signed with the M18 eastwards up to the next junction, where the M18 becomes Annet Road south-eastwards and the M17 continues eastwards as Empire Road to reach its terminus at a junction with the M7 and M71 (Barry Hertzog Avenue).
