= Houghton Estate =

- Location within Gauteng Location within South Africa Location within Africa
- Coordinates: 26°9′S 28°3′E
- Country: South Africa
- Province: Gauteng
- Municipality: City of Johannesburg
- Main Place: Johannesburg

Government
  - Type: City of Johannesburg Metropolitan Municipality
  - Councillor: Marcelle Ravid (Ward 73), Sihlwele Myeki (Ward 67) (DA (Ward 73), ANC (Ward 67))

Area
  - Total: 6.94 km^{2} (2.68 sq mi)

Population (2011)
  - Total: 7,867
  - Density: 1,130/km^{2} (2,940/sq mi)

Racial makeup (2011)
  - Black African: 39.4%
  - Coloured: 2.0%
  - Indian/Asian: 22.4%
  - White: 34.3%
  - Other: 2.0%

First languages (2011)
  - English: 60.2%
  - Zulu: 8.0%
  - Afrikaans: 5.7%
  - Northern Sotho: 3.9%
  - Other: 22.3%
- Time zone: UTC+2 (SAST)
- Postal code (street): 2198

Houghton Estate, often simply called Houghton, is an affluent suburb of Johannesburg, South Africa, north-east of the city centre. The area was designated for white residents as part of the Group Areas Act during the apartheid era and became known as one of the city's upper-class neighbourhoods.

Historically, the area has attracted a significant number of Jewish residents and is the home of Johannesburg's flagship Orthodox synagogue, Great Park Synagogue. Helen Suzman, a Jewish politician represented the suburb as Member of Parliament for Houghton from 1953 to 1989. Suzman was succeeded by Tony Leon.

The suburb is also known for being the home of the late president, Nelson Mandela.

== History ==
Houghton was developed as a residential area around the turn of the 20th century, primarily by the Johannesburg Consolidated Investment Company (JCI). The suburb was laid out by surveyor Gustav Arthur Troye.

== Geography ==
=== Communities ===
Houghton Estate has traditionally been informally divided into Upper and Lower Houghton. Upper Houghton is the southern and south-eastern portion located on a ridge, while the northern Lower Houghton is flatter and has a grid street pattern, with parts on both sides of the M1 freeway. Upper Houghton has been declared a National Heritage Area.

Upper and Lower Houghton are separated by the East-West section of Houghton Drive and part of Louis Botha Avenue. Small sections of Upper Houghton lie east of Louis Botha Avenue (bordering Observatory), and west of the north–south section of Houghton Drive (bordering Parktown and Hillbrow). Houghton is surrounded by wealthy suburbs in all directions, except south, where Upper Houghton borders less-affluent suburbs like Yeoville and Hillbrow.

=== Architecture ===
Historically a wealthy area, it contains many mansions on big stands, blocks of flats, as well as office parks (developed on the sites of former homes) on streets close to the M1 and on Louis Botha Avenue. Houghton is architecturally varied.

There are good examples of art deco buildings (particularly some of the flats) and homes such as Silver Pines (1936). The house was designed by Swiss architect Theophile Schaerer for Rand pioneer and German Jewish migrant, Bernard Kaumhelmer, father of anthropologist, Ellen Hellmann. And many of the large houses in the 1930s are good examples of the Modern style inspired by the work of Le Corbusier (Chipkin 1993), including Stern House (1935) designed by Rex Distin Martienssen and partners, as well as House Marks (1940) by Harold Le Roith.

Architect Piercy Patrick Eagle, also responsible for Jeppe High School for Boys and King Edward VII High School, designed 36 Houghton Drive (1919) in the Arts and Crafts style. Normandie (1934) was also built in this style and designed by Harold Wolseley Spicer. The home was later purchased by Dr Polonsky in 1939. A year later, his son, Antony Polonsky, a Holocaust scholar, was born in the house. Mourgana (1927) is also built in this style and was designed by Walter and Cyril Reid.

House Suzman (1937) was designed by J.C. Cook & Cowen in the Spanish Mission style for the couple, Saul Suzman and Betty Sonnenberg, daughter of Max Sonnenberg. They were the parents of actress, Janet Suzman.

Noordhoek (1938) was built in the Cape Dutch Revival style and designed by Albert Hoogterp. The house was commissioned by stockbroker Maurice Lipschitz.

The suburb, particularly Lower Houghton, is currently experiencing rapid redevelopment. Although many plots had already been subdivided in two, there is now a trend towards the development of cluster homes. This redevelopment is sanctioned by the City of Johannesburg's Regional Spatial Development Framework. The city sees many positive aspects to the redevelopment, but it is not uncontroversial and has resulted in the destruction of many traditional houses. Many residents actively oppose increasing densification of the suburb.

Upper Houghton was declared a national heritage area in 2010. In recent years, parts of the suburb have faced urban decline amid municipal neglect, abandoned or vacant properties, high-rental density and slumlords.

== Demographics ==
=== Religion ===
As with many suburbs in the North-East of Johannesburg, Houghton has historically been known for being a Jewish area, and is home to Great Park Synagogue. Great Park was consecrated in Houghton in 2000 after its congregation closed its historic synagogue in Hillbrow in 1994, as the area declined and Jewish congregants moved towards the northern suburbs. Houghton is also home to West Street Shul.

There is also a Muslim community that has expanded in the northern suburbs since the repeal of the apartheid-era Group Areas Act. A musallah was established in the east of the suburb, and, in 2011, a mosque, Masjid ul Furqaan was built by the Houghton Muslim Association on the site of the mussalah. Another, larger mosque on West Street, visible from the M1 freeway, was, after delays, completed in 2013 by the Houghton Muslim Jamaat.

== Economy ==
=== Retail ===
There are few shops in Houghton itself, apart from convenience stores in petrol stations, but the area is close to numerous commercial nodes in Johannesburg, including those in Oaklands, Norwood, Killarney, Rosebank and Sandton.

== Parks and greenspace ==
Houghton has two golf courses, Houghton Golf Club (1914) and the Killarney Golf Club (1903). There is also a large public park, The Wilds (which has been described as "notorious" for muggings and crime). A large sports club, the Old Edwardian Society (known as Old Eds), which includes a separate Virgin Active gym, is in Houghton.

== Education ==
There are a number of well known schools in Upper Houghton: King Edward VII School (1909), a public school for boys, also known as KES), along with its associated primary school, King Edward VII Preparatory School, known as KEPS, and St John's College (1907) a private Anglican school historically only for boys, while Roedean School (South Africa), a private girls school, is close by in Parktown. Houghton School (a public primary school) is in Lower Houghton.

== Law and government ==
=== Government ===
Lower Houghton, and a small part of Upper Houghton, bordering Observatory, are part of Region E of the City of Johannesburg Metropolitan Municipality, and are currently (as of 2014) included in Ward 73, while most of Upper Houghton is part of Region F of the City of Johannesburg Metropolitan Municipality, and is part of Ward 67.

=== Politics ===
During the apartheid era, the Houghton constituency in the whites-only parliament was represented by opponent of apartheid Helen Suzman until 1989, and was, for a period in the 1960s, the sole seat of the Progressive Party in Parliament.

=== Crime ===
Lower Houghton is part of the SAPS Norwood Police Station precinct, while Upper Houghton is part of the Hillbrow Police Station's precinct.

== Infrastructure ==
=== Roads ===
Houghton is centrally located, straddling the M1 freeway, with interchanges at Glenhove Road (M1 N & S), Eleventh Avenue (M1 S), Riviera Road (M1 N), 1st Avenue (M1 S) and Houghton Drive (M1 N). Multiple metropolitan routes cross Houghton, including the M16, M20, M31, R25, and M11 (Louis Botha Avenue).

The grid street pattern in Lower Houghton consists mostly of numbered Streets and Avenues on both sides of the M1. Avenues run east–west, while Streets run from north to south. Avenue counting begins in the south with First Avenue (part of Metropolitan Route M16), and ends in the North with Seventeenth Avenue, while Street counting begins in the east with 1st Street, and ends in the West at 9th Street, with the numbered grid interrupted by Central, West and River Streets. North–south streets in Upper Houghton are generally named after trees, while east–west roads are named after Christian saints.

Lower Houghton and Upper Houghton are linked by Louis Botha Avenue, Houghton Drive, and the steep and winding Munro Drive, a National Monument which has a viewpoint with a view over the northern suburbs of Johannesburg.

=== Public transport ===
Louis Botha Avenue, in the east of the suburb, is an important minibus taxi route linking Hillbrow to Alexandra, and, as of 2014, construction began on the expansion of Johannesburg's Rea Vaya bus rapid transit system to Louis Botha Avenue. A Gautrain bus feeder route (numbered RB5) runs past the office parks on West Street, linking to the Rosebank Gautrain Station.

== Notable people ==
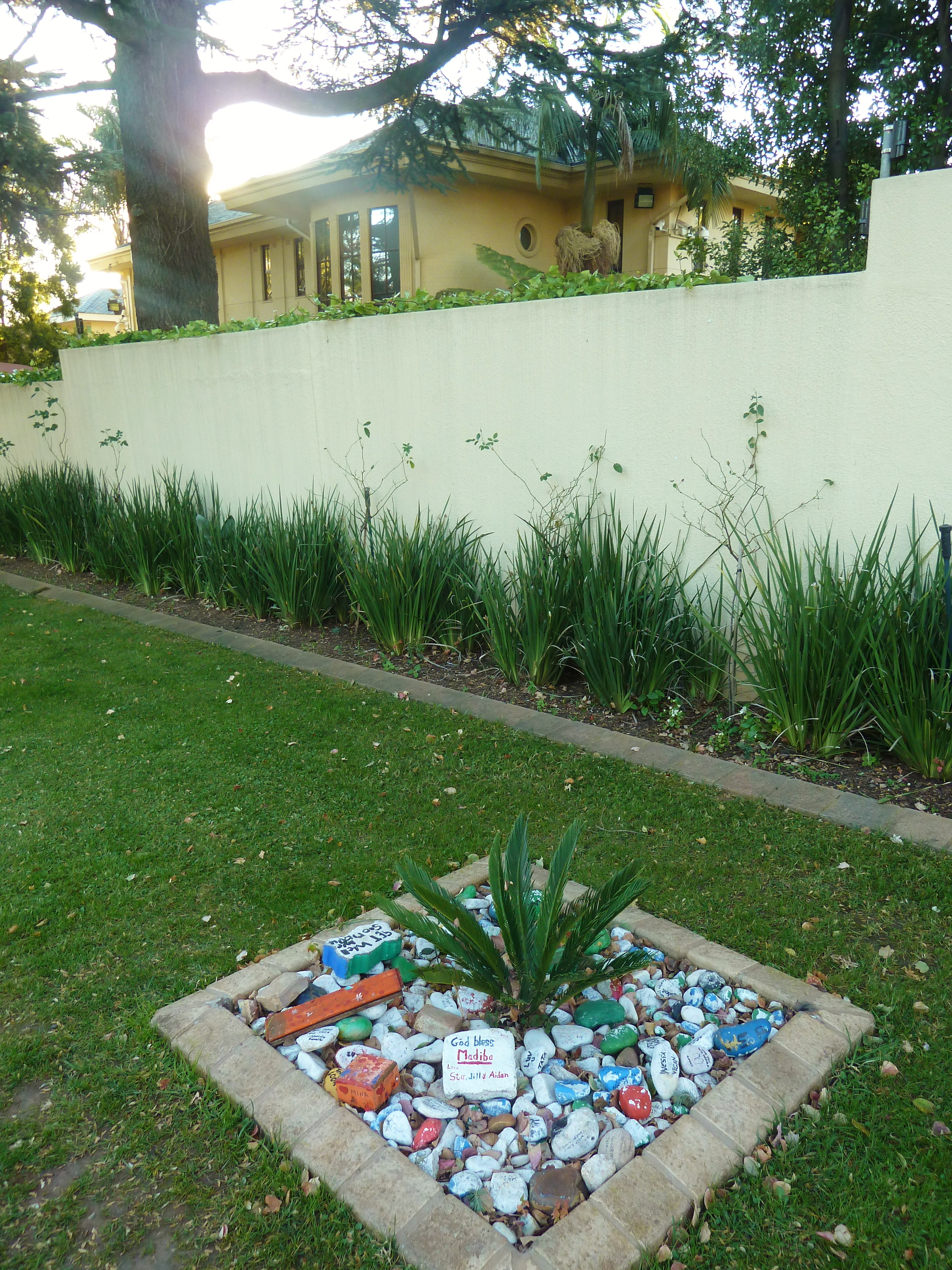
Mandela Mansion, Houghton Estate, Johannesburg, 2014. Well-wishing mementos have been left in the foreground.

- Nelson Mandela, who died in December 2013 at his Lower Houghton home, which became a site of remembrance in the immediate aftermath of his death. His residence was on the corner of 4th Street and 12th Avenue.
- Janet Suzman, an actress who lived at House Suzman on 8th Avenue in Lower Houghton in a home commissioned by her parents.
- Antony Polonsky, an eminent Holocaust scholar born and raised in Normandie, a home commissioned by his parents.
- Reza Shah Pahlavi, a former King of Iran, lived in exile at 41 Young Avenue in Upper Houghton, between 1942 and his death in July 1944.
