= Raumarais Park =

- Location within Gauteng Location within South Africa
- Coordinates: 26.120°S 28.079°E
- Country: South Africa
- Province: Gauteng
- Municipality: City of Johannesburg
- Main Place: Johannesburg

Area
  - Total: 0.23 km^{2} (0.089 sq mi)

Population (2011)
  - Total: 435
  - Density: 1,900/km^{2} (4,900/sq mi)

Racial makeup (2011)
  - Black African: 51.8%
  - Coloured: 6.2%
  - Indian/Asian: 12.0%
  - White: 22.8%
  - Other: 7.1%

First languages (2011)
  - English: 61.3%
  - Zulu: 9.4%
  - Tswana: 6.9%
  - Northern Sotho: 5.8%
  - Other: 16.6%
- Time zone: UTC+2 (SAST)

Raumarais Park is a suburb of Johannesburg, South Africa. The suburb lies north of Bramley. It is located in Region E of the City of Johannesburg Metropolitan Municipality.

== History ==
The suburb is situated on part of an old Witwatersrand farm called Syferfontein. It is named after the land owner Magdelena Johanna Rautenbach née Marais. It became a suburb on 30 July 1947.
