= M30 (Johannesburg) =

Metropolitan route in the City of Johannesburg, South Africa

Metropolitan route M30

Route information
- Maintained by Johannesburg Roads Agency and Gauteng Department of Roads and Transport
- Length: 21.1 km (13.1 mi)

Major junctions
- West end: M18 Ontdekkers Road
- M5 Beyers Naude Drive; M71 Barry Hertzog Avenue; M27 Jan Smuts Avenue; M9 Oxford Road; M1 De Villiers Graaff motorway M11 Louis Botha Avenue
- East end: R25 Modderfontein Road

Location
- Country: South Africa

Highway system
- Numbered routes of South Africa
← M27	→ M31

The M30 is a metropolitan route in the City of Johannesburg, South Africa connecting Florida in the west with Lombardy East and Edenvale.

== Route ==
The M30 begins at the Ontdekkers Road (M18) in Delarey. It heads east as Mollie Road before turning north-east as Long Road through Newlands. Continuing through Albertskroon as 5th Street then for a short distance as Milner Avenue where it crosses the Montgomery Spruit through Montgomery Park. The route splits from Millar and becomes Preller Drive and soon crosses the Beyers Naude Drive (M5) in Linden. Continuing in a north-east direction through Emmarentia, Preller becomes Hoyfmeyr Drive before merging with Tana Road where it crosses 3rd Avenue and Linden Road (M20). Tana crosses the Rustenburg Road / Barry Hertzog Avenue (M71) in Greenside and then becomes 6th Street in Parkhurst in an easterly direction. 6th Street becomes 7th Avenue in Parktown North and reaches Jan Smuts Avenue (M27) in Rosebank. The route turns north and co-signs with Jan Smuts Avenue for a short distance and then leaves the latter heading east through Rosebank as Jellicoe Avenue. It reaches Oxford Road (M9) as a T-junction where it turns north through Melrose co-signed with the M9 for a short distance before leaving and heading north-east as Corlett Drive through Illovo crossing the M1 motorway. Heading through Bramley, it intersects Louis Botha Avenue (M11) and into Kew as 9th Road. It then turns south-west as Canning Road into Lombardy West and then through Lombardy East as Wordsworth Road and ends as it reaches Modderfontein Road (R25).
