= Munro Drive =

Suburban pass in South Africa

Coordinates: 26°10′25.5″S 28°03′36.97″E

- Interactive map of Munro Drive
- Elevation: 1,770 metres (5,810 ft)
- Traversed by: The Munro Drive

Third Approach
- Location: Upper Houghton, Johannesburg, South Africa
- Range: Witwatersrand

Munro Drive is a suburban pass through the Linksfield Ridge on the Witwatersrand range in Johannesburg, South Africa. It connects the suburbs of Upper and Lower Houghton. The drive is about 900 metres (3,000 ft) long and rises around 43 metres (141 ft) to the summit.

== History ==
The pass is named after John Munro, director of Johannesburg Consolidated Investment Company (JCI). JCI owned the land called the Houghton Estate. It was completed in 1918. The pass was cut through quartz rock allowing access to the newer northern suburbs. The new road collapsed in its first year and was rebuilt in 1919. It has a u-shape bend and a stone retaining wall, rebuilt in 1938 and made from the local quartz. A viewing site sits close to the top of the pass and looks over the northern suburbs.
