= The Wilds (Johannesburg) =

Inner city park in Johannesburg, South Africa

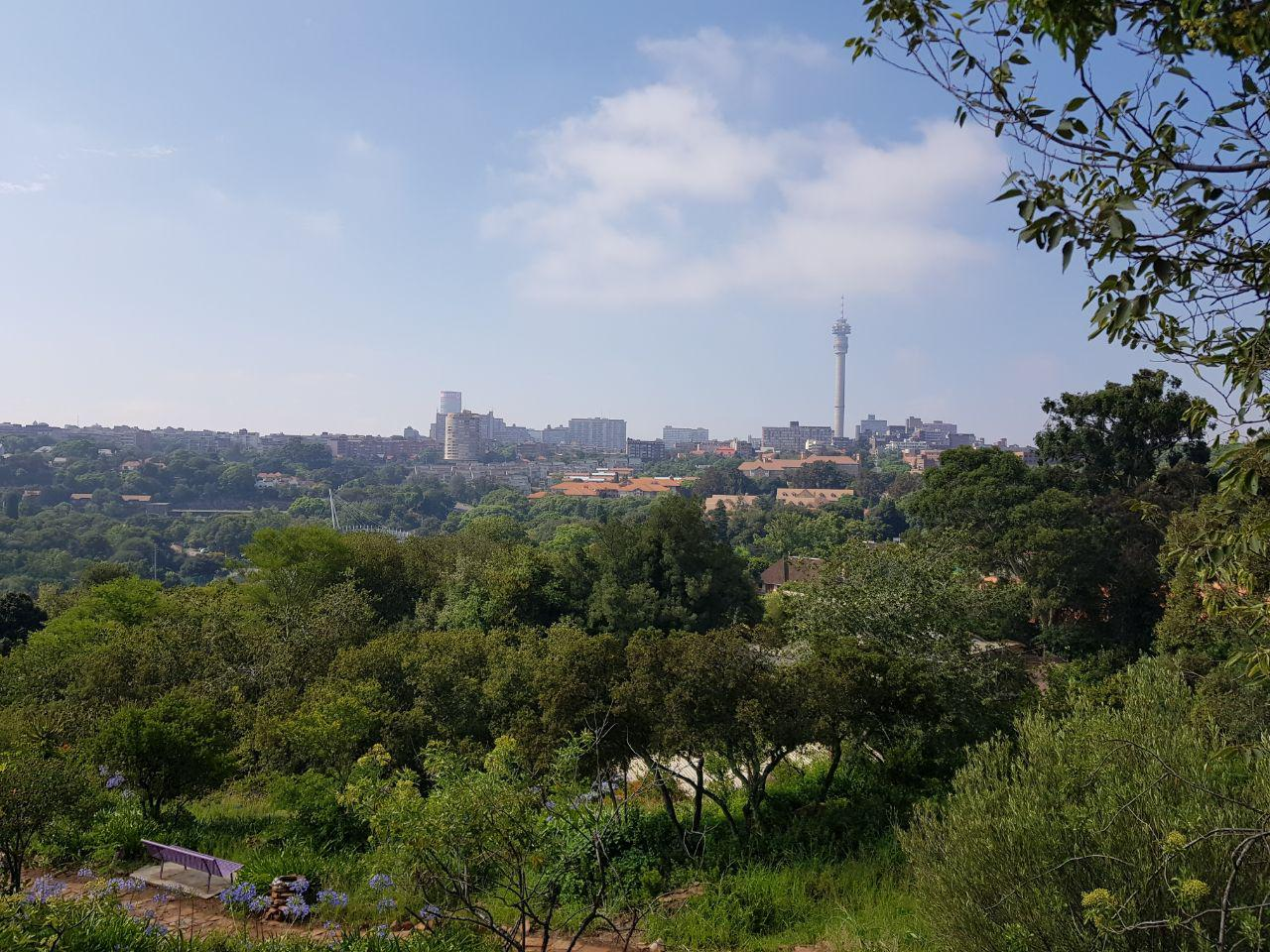
- View of Johannesburg CBD from The Wilds municipal Nature Reserve
- Interactive map of The Wilds
- Type: Inner city park
- Location: Houghton Drive, Houghton, Gauteng
- Nearest city: Johannesburg
- Coordinates: 26°10′27″S 28°3′10″E
- Area: 16 hectares (40 acres)
- Created: 1937
- Operator: Johannesburg City Parks
- Open: All year
- Parking: Cnr of Houghton Drive and St. Patricks
- Website: www.jhbcityparks.com

The Wilds is an inner city park and nature reserve in the suburb of Houghton, in the city of Johannesburg, South Africa. The park consists of 16 hectares of indigenous vegetation on the sides of two rocky koppies or hills with views of the city of Johannesburg and its suburbs. Through the 1990s the park gained a reputation for being highly dangerous and crime ridden, however, it has since become "rejuvenated" due to the efforts of volunteers.

== History ==
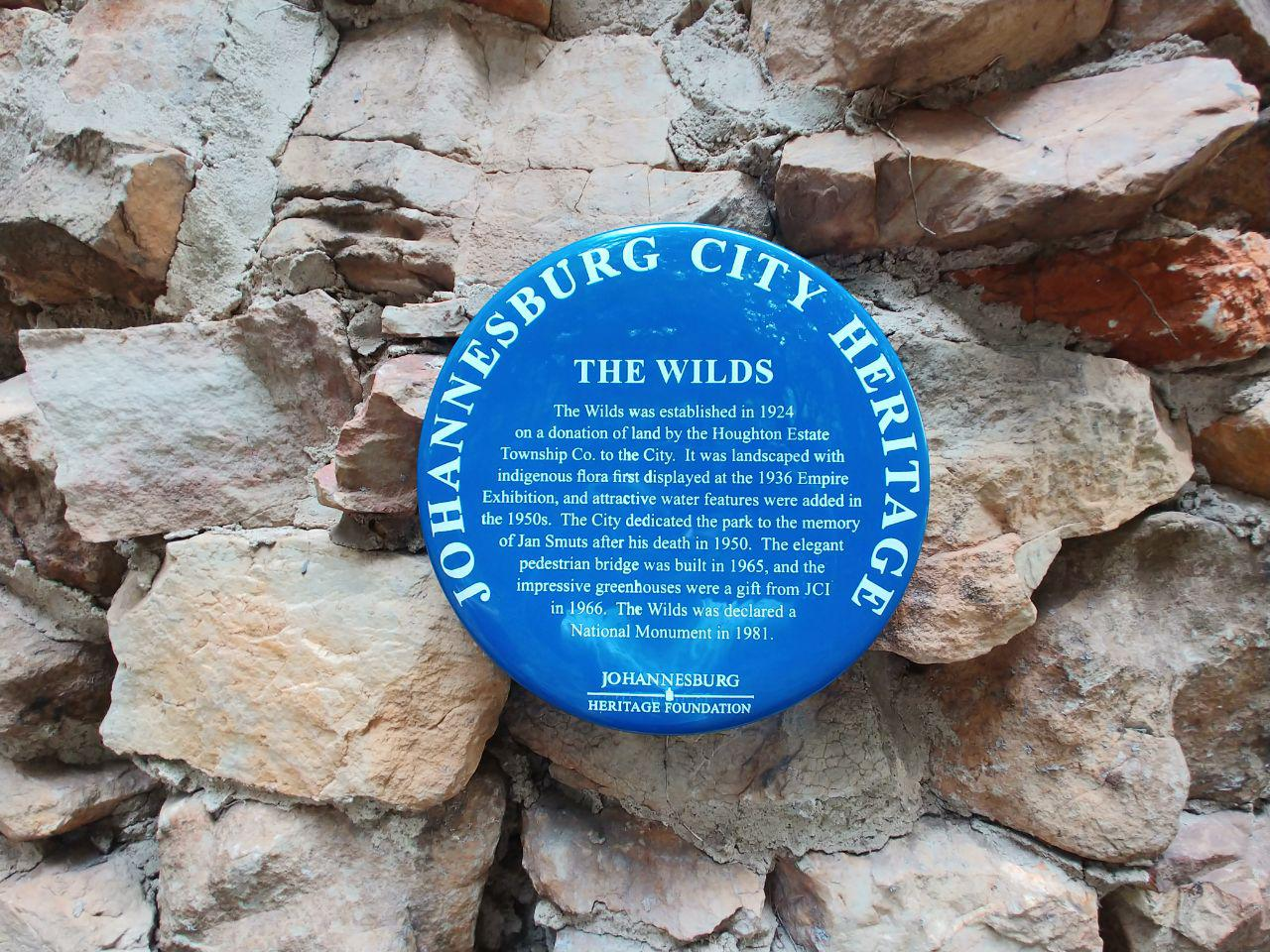
The Wilds - Johannesburg City Heritage site

The land was donated to the City of Johannesburg by the Johannesburg Consolidated Investment Company in 1924 with the condition that it remains in its natural state and open to the public. The land was too steep to be used for residential property development. After the end of the Empire Exhibition in January 1937, the plants from a rockery created to celebrated the city's silver jubilee and coronation of King George VI, had to be propagated somewhere and a decision was made to landscape the land as park with these plants. It opened to the public in 1938 with lawns, ponds and waterfalls with paths through park laid out in stone. The park is found on both sides of Houghton Drive and was connected by a footbridge in 1965.

The Wilds was dedicated to General Jan Smuts after his death in 1950. It was declared a national monument on 20 February 1981 and a conservation area in 2006. Whilst The Wilds, since 2013, is managed by the Johannesburg City Parks and Zoo (JCPZ), a non-profit company mandated by the City of Johannesburg to manage the cemeteries, parks and designated public open spaces, it is private citizens who contribute to the upkeep and rejuvenation of the park with little help from the JCPZ. In January 2019, The Wilds was awarded a Blue Heritage Plaque by the Johannesburg Heritage Foundation.

Whilst writing his novel Jock of the Bushveld, Sir James Percy FitzPatrick lived in the house Hohenheim bordering the area that is now The Wilds which would have formed an extension of his garden.

== Decline and rejuvenation ==
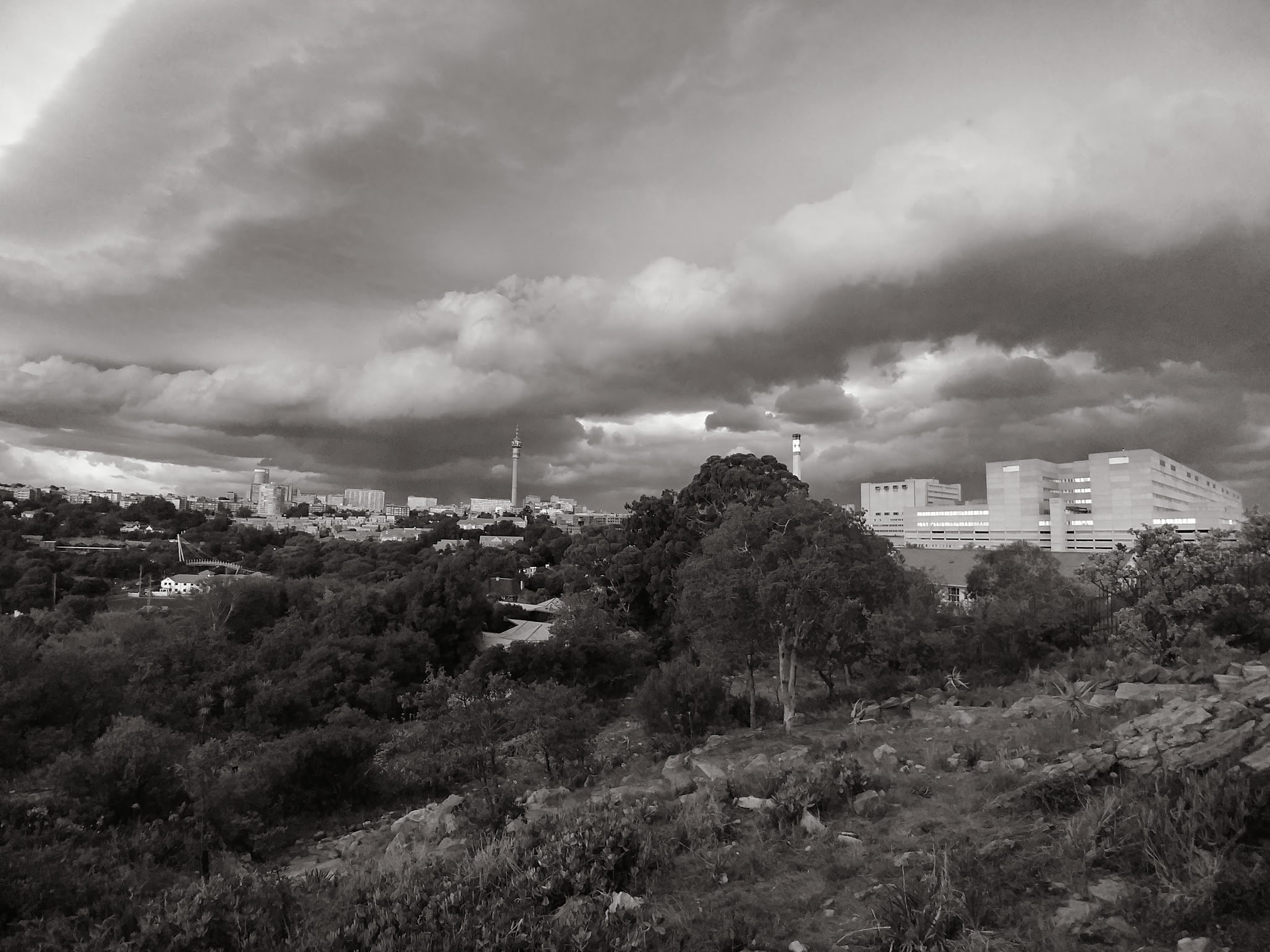
View of The Charlotte Maxeke Hospital from The Wilds

Beginning in the early 1990s, the park started developing a reputation for being a crime hotspot. It was entirely unfenced and due to the dense foliage in parts of the park, it made for easy targets. Residents of the neighbouring areas began avoiding the park and it became well known as a no-go area. In the early 2000s, Yeoville resident TJ de Klerk led guided dog walks through the park and lobbied City Parks and some funders to have the park fenced off and have security installed. This led to significant reductions in crime. However, its reputation remained. In 2012, Johannesburg artist, James Delaney, decided to reclaim the park and began an ongoing project of de-weeding and clearing some of the dense overgrowth in order to create good lines of sight between paths.

The Wilds has since won several awards from Business Arts SA, the SA Institute of Architecture, Caxton's Best of Joburg and Rotary. The park has been featured in media articles all over South Africa and the world.

== Features and vegetation ==
The Wilds features over 8 kilometres of stone pathway. There are also a number of water features including streams, ponds and waterfalls, however, water was cut off to these during the abandonment of the park and the City of Johannesburg is yet to restore this, despite numerous efforts from those involved in rejuvenation of the park.

After the 1936 Empire Exhibition hosted in Johannesburg, The Wilds was designated as an indigenous South African botanical garden. The topography is highly contrasted, featuring lush lawns, Yellowwood forests, and Highveld koppie.

On the Southwest side of the park, there are a collection of greenhouses which have fallen into decay and are fenced off from public access.

The park offers views of Hillbrow, Berea and the inner city, including views of several Johannesburg landmarks.

== Artworks ==
The Wilds has become home to a number of artworks over the since 2017. Most of these have been contributed by James Delaney who creates brightly painted laser cut animals. This began with the Owl Forest, a collection of 67 Owls contributed for Mandela Day in 2017. Delaney has also named and signposted sections of the park according to the artworks which he has contributed to these areas.

== Community involvement ==
Since Delaney's Owl Forest, a number of community organisations have joined in trying to bring people back to The Wilds.

In May 2019, "We Love Killarney" a non-profit community organisation set up to implement a series of improvements to the adjacent neighbourhood of Killarney revealed a plan to reopen an entrance to The Wilds from Killarney with an archway connected to the Killarney park by an upgraded pavement.

Another initiative launched in 2019 was a series of Sunday "Walk and Talks" where presenters could sign up to lead a guided walk through the park whilst speaking on any topic of their choice.

The park also has regular yoga and meditations sessions taking place on the lawns.
