= M33 (Johannesburg) =

Metropolitan route in Johannesburg, South Africa

Metropolitan route M33

Route information
- Maintained by Johannesburg Roads Agency and Gauteng Department of Roads and Transport
- Length: 8.5 mi (13.7 km)

Major junctions
- South end: M31 Heidelberg Road, City Deep
- M2 Cleveland Road, Heriotdale; R29 Main Reef Road, Cleveland; M14 Jules Street, Malvern; R24 Albertina Sisulu Road, South Kensington; M18 Marcia Street, Cyrildene; M16 8th Street, Orange Grove
- North end: R25 Hathorn Avenue, Sydenham

Location
- Country: South Africa

Highway system
- Numbered routes of South Africa
← M32	→ M34

The M33 is a metropolitan route in Johannesburg, South Africa. The southern half of the road connects the light industry areas of City Deep and Rosherville with the M2 motorway while the northern half connects the eastern suburbs of Johannesburg with the northern suburbs.

== Route ==
The M33 starts as a junction with the M31 (Heidelberg Road) in the City Deep industrial area. It begins by heading north-east as Houer Road and then turns east, entering the suburb of Rosherville before turning north now as Lower Germiston Road. Leaving Rosherville, it heads north over railway lines as Cleveland Road, passing through the industrial suburb of Heriotdale and reaching the Cleveland Road Interchange with the M2 motorway (Francois Oberholzer Freeway).

Immediately after crossing the M2, Cleveland Road intercepts the R29 (Main Reef Road), crossing it as a horseshoe curve, before continuing northwards into the light industrial suburb of Cleveland, becoming 31st Street and meeting the M14 (Jules Street) in Malvern. Crossing the M14, it heads north as Monmouth Street to Pandora Road in Kensington. Turning left onto Pandora Road, it heads west before turning north-west at the next junction onto Queen Street. It then crosses the R24 (Albertina Sisulu Road).

Crossing the R24, it passes north through Bruma, crossing the Jukskei River before intersecting the M18 (Marcia Street) in Cyrildene. Crossing the M18, it heads northwards as Friedland Avenue and then turns west as Cooper Street until it reaches a roundabout with Frederick Street in Observatory. The M33 now turns north as Louise Street, then west as Grace Road, then north as Sylvia Pass.

Crossing over the ridge as Sylvia Pass, the route curves as it heads down into Mountain View and Linksfield Ridge. Now called Goodman Terrace, the M33 continues north, reaching 7th Street, where it turns right and then left onto 9th Avenue, meeting the M16 (8th Street) at the next junction. Continuing north, the M33 reaches its end by intersecting the R25 at Hathorn Avenue and Durham Street.
