= M20 (Johannesburg) =

Metropolitan route in the City of Johannesburg, South Africa

Metropolitan route M20

Route information
- Maintained by Johannesburg Roads Agency and Gauteng Department of Roads and Transport
- Length: 17 km (11 mi)

Major junctions
- West end: M8 / M13
- M30 Tana Road; M71 Barry Hertzog Avenue; M27 Jan Smuts Avenue; M9 Oxford Road; M1 De Villiers Graaff Motorway; M31 Central Street; M11 Louis Botha Avenue
- East end: R25 Modderfontein Road

Location
- Country: South Africa

Highway system
- Numbered routes of South Africa
← M19	→ M22

The M20 is a short metropolitan route in the Greater Johannesburg metropolitan area, South Africa. It connects Randburg in the western part of Johannesburg with Edenvale in the east.

== Route ==
The M20 begins at the intersection of M8 Judges Avenue and M13 Republic Road in Cresta. The route winds its way south as Republic Road, passing Cresta Shopping Centre on its right and then rounds the northern end of the Darrenwood Dam. It then heads south-east, still as Republic Road, through the suburb of Linden, crossing 1st Street and becoming 3rd Avenue until it reaches the intersection with M30 Tana Road. Crossing the latter and a tributary of the Braamfontein Spruit it becomes Linden Road in Emmarentia and after a short distance turns left into Gleneagles Road, travelling east through Greenside and crossing the M71 Barry Hertzog Avenue. The M20 continues east, then south-east, still as Gleneagles Road, crossing the Braamfontein Spruit and Parkview Golf Course. It then continues northeast as Derry Road, then as Chester Road on the border of Parktown and Parkwood before turning east and crosses the intersection of the M27 at Jan Smuts Avenue, becoming Bolton Road in Rosebank and then reaches the M9 Oxford Road in the same suburb.

Crossing Oxford Road into Melrose, the M20 continues as Glenhove Road, turning slightly northeast and soon intersects the M1 North motorway. Crossing the motorway, it enters Oaklands as Pretoria Street, briefly co-signed with M31 heading northeast. Shortly after it crosses the Orange Grove Spruit in Waverley and Highlands North, it breaks away from Pretoria Street heading northeast very briefly as Woodyatt Avenue before heading east as Atholl Street passing the schools of St Mary's and Waverley Girls' High School. Shortly after those two sites, it intersects the M11 Louis Botha Avenue. Having crossed the latter, the M20 heads briefly past Balfour Park Shopping Centre where it splits heading northeast as Northview Road in Bramley Gardens then becomes Johannesburg Road. At the intersection with Drone Road, it becomes Pretoria Road and heads east then south-east where it ends ar a t-junction with the R25 Modderfontein Road west of Edenvale.
