= Grayston Pedestrian and Cycle Bridge =

- Coordinates: 26°6′26.85″S 28°4′35.14″E
- Carries: Cycle and pedestrian traffic
- Crosses: M1 motorway
- Locale: Johannesburg
- Official name: Kopanang Bridge (proposed)

Characteristics
- Total length: 176m
- Width: 7.65m
- Longest span: 100m

History
- Opened: 18 May 2018

Location
- Interactive map of Grayston Pedestrian and Cycle Bridge

The Grayston Pedestrian and Cycle Bridge, previously also known as The Great Walk Bridge, forms part of a 5 km dedicated path between Alexandra on the eastern and Sandton on the western side of the M1 motorway in Johannesburg. Proposals have been made by City of Johannesburg to adopt the official name Kopanang Bridge.

== Structural design ==
The bridge is a cantilever spar cable-stayed bridge and is designed to fit snugly just north of the M40 Grayston Drive interchange with M1 motorway. The straight central section of the bridge is 176m long and consists of three spans. The two short spans are 38 m long and cross the on and off ramps on the eastern and western sides respectively. The main span of the bridge is 100m long and consists of a single and continuous cable-stayed deck supported by a single 70m high inclined pylon 26°6′26.85″S 28°4′35.14″E on the western side and by a pier on the eastern side. The deck is suspended by means of nine cables extending diagonally from the pylon and attached to the deck along the median. The pylon is inclined towards the west and is restrained by a double set of nine cables extending down to a pair of plinths at ground level.

== Collapse during construction ==
On 14 October 2015 temporary works erected over the busy M1 motorway collapsed onto the passing traffic. Two people were killed and 19 were injured in the collapse which blocked both the north and southbound traffic. At the time of the collapse very little permanent works had been executed by the contractor. Piling on the western side in the vicinity of the foundations for the pylon had been completed and on day of the collapse blinding concrete was being placed to the base of the pylon pile cap. After the collapse the contractor adopted an alternative construction method which was analysed in December 2015.

== Deaths during construction ==
- A motorist Mr Adrian Doodnath and a taxi driver Mr Siyabonga Myeni were killed on 14 October 2015 when temporary works collapsed onto the vehicles they were driving.
- A forty-one year old construction worker Mr Enoch Maphunye fell to his death from the height of several floors on 30 November 2017.

== Section 32 Inquiry ==
- On 28 October 2015 the Department of Labour released a preliminary report and announced that a Section 32 inquiry in terms of the OSH Act would be held in public.
- On 19 November 2015 Commissioner Lennie Samuel was appointed Presiding Inspector for the Section 32
- A media briefing was held on 8 December 2015. Labour hosts media briefing on Grayston Drive Pedestrian and cyclist structural bridge collapse.
- Gregory Harington, a structural engineer with many years’ experience, submitted a report to the Department of Labour on 12 February 2016, highlighting three basic issues that might have contributed to the tragic event.
- The first session of the Inquiry began on 16 February 2016.
- Inquiry scheduled to resume on 26 September 2017.
- Inquiry postponed until July 2018 after concluding with expert witnesses.
- On 8 March 2018 the Department of Labour announced the appointment of a new presiding officer.
