= M2 (Johannesburg) =

Freeway in Johannesburg, South Africa

Metropolitan route M2
- Francois Oberholzer Freeway

Route information
- Maintained by Johannesburg Roads Agency and Gauteng Department of Roads and Transport
- Length: 9.4 mi (15.1 km)

Major junctions
- West end: R41 Main Reef Road in Selby Extension, Johannesburg
- M1 South - Crown Interchange; M1 North - Sandton/Pretoria; M9 Rissik Street, Selby; M11 Mooi Street; M31 Heidelberg Road; M31 Joe Slovo Drive; Maritzburg Street, Kaserne; M19 Ruven Road, Benrose; Chilvers Street, Denver M33 Cleveland Road; N3 / N12 Geldenhuis Interchange

- East end: M93 Refinery Road in Germiston

Location
- Country: South Africa

Highway system
- Numbered routes of South Africa
← M1	→ M5

The M2 is a major highway and metropolitan route in Greater Johannesburg, South Africa. It is named the Francois Oberholzer Freeway. It runs just to the south of the Johannesburg Central Business District eastwards where it connects with the N3 (only a short segment goes to the west of the Johannesburg CBD) and enters Germiston, ending near its CBD. The north–south M1 intersects with the M2 just to the south-west of the Johannesburg CBD.

== Route ==
The M2 route begins just west of the Germiston city centre (capital of Ekurhuleni). It begins by heading westwards from Jack Street at the junction with the M93 Refinery Road, immediately becoming a freeway (Francois Oberholzer Freeway). The motorway continues westwards and reaches the Geldenhuys Interchange with the N3/N12 highway (Johannesburg Eastern Bypass), where it exits Germiston and crosses into Johannesburg. Crossing under the N3 highway, it continues westwards as the road separating the two industrial areas of Heriotdale and Cleveland and reaches its first off-ramp with the M33 Cleveland Road. It continues westward to the Denver Interchange at Chilvers Street. Shortly after that interchange, there is an exit and on-ramp from the M2 West at the M19 Ruven Road and the same for the M2 East intersection at New Goch Road. The motorway continues westward past the Kaserne Railyards to the Maritzburg Street Interchange. A short distance past that interchange, it passes through the Heidelberg Road Interchange. This interchange connects with the M31 North Joe Slovo Drive (which is an eastern bypass of the CBD to the northern suburbs and the M1 North) and the M31 South Heidelberg Road to Alberton. It then passes shortly over the M11 Mooi Street allowing traffic to exit the M2 East and enter the M2 West.

Passing over Rosettenville Road, it reaches Eloff Street where off-ramps on M2 West allow exits to Stott Street and the M9 Rissik Street while the M2 East allows an exit to the M9 Rissik Street and an on-ramp from Village Road. Continuing westward it crosses over the M27 Simmonds Street with an on-ramp to the M2 East and then the route crosses Booysens Road and reaches the Westgate Interchange. Here vehicles can enter and exit the M2 from Ntemi Piliso Street, leave the M2 and exit north on the M1 crossing the CBD via the Goch Street double-decker overpass or exit south to M1 and the southern suburbs. The M2 continues westward to the Crown Interchange that allows vehicles from M1 South to head east or west along the M2. Passing through the Crown Interchange, it flies over Treu Road into the suburb of Crown and ends shortly thereafter at a junction with the R41 Main Reef Road, which heads to Roodepoort in the west and the Johannesburg CBD in the north-east.

== History ==
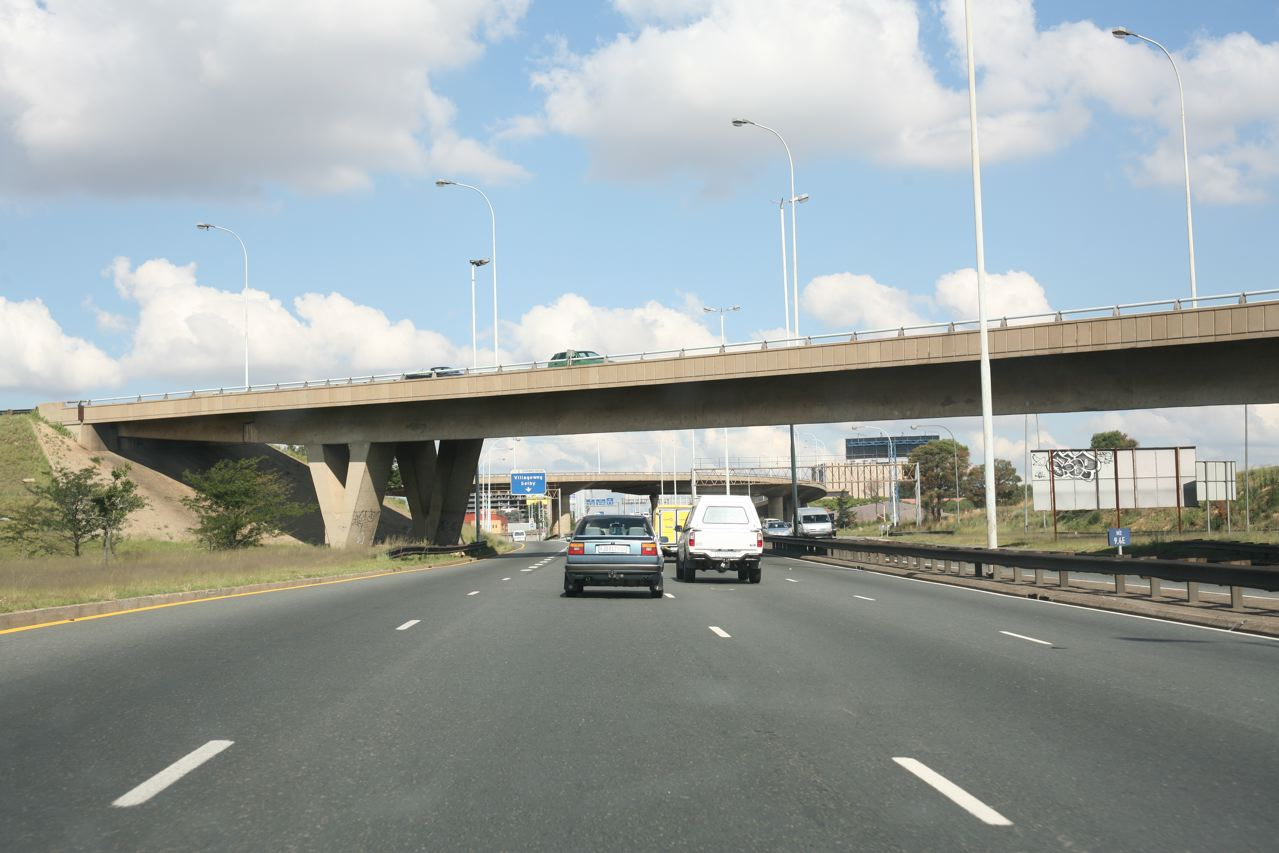
The M2 in the afternoon as it passes through the Central Business District

Both the M2 and M1 motorways have their beginnings in a 1948 traffic planning scheme developed by the Johannesburg City Council and examined by American traffic engineering consultant Lloyd B. Reid in 1954. Two 10-year plans examined among other things the idea of new urban motorways and improving existing highways. The plan called for two motorways, one running east–west along the southern CBD and the other running north–south on the western side of the CBD. The plan was linked to the national and provincial governments plan by the National Transport Commission for the Western and Eastern Bypasses, the future N1 and N3/N12. The East-West Motorway (M2) would have its beginning at the Eastern Bypass now known as the Geldenhuis Interchange, though it presently begins further eastwards in Germiston at Refinery Road.

The motorway would then continue westwards over old mining properties and original gold-bearing reefs ending at Main Reef Road near Church Street. The plan was for it to eventually reach the proposed Western Bypass, but it never did. Apart from several diamond interchanges connecting to existing main roads in and out of the city, there would be two large interchanges that would be built on mine dumps. The first would be constructed near New Kazerine and would connect Heidelberg Road to the south and Harrow Road (now Joe Slovo Drive) northwards while the second large interchange, further on, would connect the North-South Motorway (M1) and the later Crown Interchange. Provisions would be made for the vertical and horizontal movement of land due subsidence of undermined land especially where old mine stopes had not been properly filled.

A two-three-lane motorway was planned with large medians for breakdowns, elevated where required, and the speed limit set at between 80 and 100 km/h (50 and 60 mph). The motorway is named after City of Johannesburg councilor J. F. Oberholzer, who was the head of the council's Works and Traffic committee.

=== Construction ===
==== 1956 ====
An early long-term motorway plan was envisaged for a future Johannesburg. The first was a north–south motorway of 18.4 km stretching from Westgate just south of the Johannesburg CBD to connect up with the existing main Pretoria Road, 5.6 km outside the Johannesburg municipal boundary in the north suburbs. The Westgate section would connect up with an east/west motorway running just south of the Johannesburg CBD. A third section involved the reconfiguration of roads to form an eastern CBD bypass connecting the north–south motorway with Saratoga Avenue.

==== 1958 ====
Improvements began on Harrow Road (Joe Slovo Drive) to widen and deepen the road and included new bridges crossing over it at Joel Road, Alexandra Street and Barnato Street's. Where Harrow Street (Joe Slovo Drive) met Louis Botha Avenue in Berea, this was to become an underpass of the latter. At the southern end of Harrow Road (Joe Slovo Drive), a flyover would cross Saratoga Avenue and would eventually connect in the future with a redesigned Siemert and Sivewright Roads.

==== 1962 ====
The construction on the Sivewright Road / Berea Street and the Siemert Road / End Street reconfiguration, important to connecting the future eastern bypass with the M1 in northern suburbs, at the proposed Killarney interchange, with the M2 East at the proposed Heidelberg Interchange, was nearing completion. Both road reconfiguration's were situated in Doornfontein, east of the Johannesburg CBD.

==== 1963 ====
An investigation began on the planned route of the east/west freeway to examine soil quality of the mine dumps and slime dams as well the position and depth of mine tunnels. Contracts were issued for the section of the M2 freeway from the Westgate Interchange eastward to Mooi Street. Contracts were also issued for the planning of the Heidelberg Interchange and its connection to Harrow Road (Joe Slovo Drive) bypass.

==== 1964 ====
The Harrow Road (Joe Slovo Drive) scheme was completed. Improvements on Harrow Road (Joe Slovo Drive) widened and deepened the road and included new bridges crossing over it at Joel Road, Alexandra Street and Barnato Street's. Where Harrow Street (Joe Slovo Drive) met Louis Botha Avenue in Berea, this had become an underpass of the latter. Work continued on the Berea-Sivewright motorway bypass works.

==== 1965–1966 ====
Work that had started on the eastern-bypass, the Berea-Sivewright Street section, was completed. At the southern end of the M1 Goch Street double-decker section, work began on the Westgate Interchange that would connect the M1 and M2 motorways but work was problematic when mine workings below the site became an issue.

==== 1967 ====
The Heidelberg Interchange was put out to tender and would cost R3.9 million. The rest of the M2 motorway was under tender or construction was beginning on the motorway.

==== 1968 ====
Work on the Siemert Road / End Street route making up part of the eastern bypass was completed.

==== 1970 ====
By this year, the Heidelberg Interchange was nearing completion.

==== 1971 ====
Construction of the Crown Interchange that would connect the M1 North–south route with the M2 was postponed when the tenders received were consider too expensive.

==== 1972 ====
The Crown Interchange tender on the M1/M2 was finally awarded and a completion date set for 1974. Heidelberg Interchange on the M2 eastern section was opened and connected the eastern CBD bypass to the M1 in the northern suburbs. A section of the M2 freeway between the Maritzberg Interchange and Heriotdale off-ramps had been completed and was opened to traffic between those two sections. Work on the section called the Kazerne Viaduct east of the Heidelberg Interchange was still under way.

==== 1973 ====
Part of the route connecting the Crown Interchange to the Westgate Interchange was now open to traffic. Work on the section called the Kazerne Viaduct east of the Heidelberg Interchange was still not completed.

==== 1974 ====
The M2 was now fully open with the completion of the Kazerne Viaduct east of the Heidelberg Interchange. Work connecting the M2 to the N3 Eastern Bypass on the eastern border with Germiston was not completed as the Geldenhuys Interchange was still being built by the Transvaal Roads Department.

==== 1978 ====
This year saw the completion and opening of the Geldenhuys Interchange which saw the M2 connected to the N3 Eastern bypass.

=== Final cost ===
The final cost of the twelve-year M1 and M2 project was R85.5 million through the awarding of twenty-seven contracts. The Provincial and National government's contributed R21 million of the final cost while land acquisitions represented 19% of the final cost. The project moved 8.3 million cubic metres of land made up of 0.3 million cubic metres of rock, 8 million cubic metres of slime and earth. Eighty new bridges were constructed and ten mine dumps moved. Seventy kilometres of drainage pipes were laid and 500,000 cubic metres of concreted poured.
