= M10 (Johannesburg) =

Metropolitan route in the City of Johannesburg, South Africa

Metropolitan route M10

Route information
- Maintained by Johannesburg Roads Agency and Gauteng Department of Roads and Transport
- Length: 40.5 km (25.2 mi)

Major junctions
- South-west end: R558 near Ennerdale
- R554 in Lenasia; N12 in Eldorado Park M68 in Pimville M79 in Orlando; M70 in Orlando; R41 near Riverlea; R24 in Industria West; M18 in Westbury; M5 in Brixton; M17 in Brixton; M1 in Braamfontein; M27 in Braamfontein; M9 in Braamfontein; M11 in Hillbrow; M31 in Doornfontein
- North-east end: M18 in Observatory

Location
- Country: South Africa

Highway system
- Numbered routes of South Africa
← M9	→ M11

The M10 is a long metropolitan route in Greater Johannesburg, South Africa. It connects Lenasia with Johannesburg Central via Soweto.

== Route ==
The M10 begins at a junction with the R558 road just north of Ennerdale. It begins by going northwards as Klipspruit Valley Road to enter the town of Lenasia, where it meets the R554 road adjacent to Trade Route Mall (just east of the Lenasia Town Centre). It continues northwards to cross the N12 Moroka Bypass and enter the township of Soweto.

Just after the N12 crossing, it turns to the east as Main Road and enters the Eldorado Park suburb. At the junction with Boundary Road in Eldorado Park, the M10 becomes Boundary Road northwards. At the Union Avenue junction in Klipriviersoog Estate, the M10 becomes Union Avenue westwards before becoming the road northwards at the next junction to be named Klipspruit Valley Road again.

It passes through the Pimville suburb to reach a junction with the M68 road (Chris Hani Road). It bends to the north-east and proceeds to pass through the Orlando area of Soweto (between Orlando West and Orlando East), where it meets the M79 road (Sofasonke Street) before bypassing the Orlando Stadium. It proceeds to reach a roundabout junction with the M70 road (Soweto Highway).

At the junction with the M70, the road continuing north-east is designated as the N17 and the M10 becomes co-signed with the M70 south-eastwards up to the next junction, where the M10 becomes New Canada Road towards the north-east. It bypasses the New Canada Dam before exiting Soweto and flying over the N1 highway (Johannesburg Western Bypass) to enter the city of Johannesburg. Immediately after the N1 overbridge, the M10 meets the R41 road (Main Reef Road) and continues north-east to meet the R24 road (Albertina Sisulu Road) in the suburb of Industria West.

It continues east-north-east, through the Newclare, Coronationville and Westbury suburbs, to reach a junction with the M18 road (Perth Road). Here, the M18 and the M10 switch roads, with the M18 becoming the east-north-easterly road and the M10 becoming the east-south-easterly road (Portland Avenue). It proceeds eastwards, meeting the M5 road at Brixton, meeting the M17 road, becoming Smit Street, to cross the M1 highway (De Villiers Graaff Motorway) and enter the suburb of Braamfontein.

It passes under the northern end of the Nelson Mandela Bridge before temporarily becoming two one-way-streets (Smit Street eastwards and Wolmarans Street westwards), bypassing the Johannesburg Park station, meeting the M9 road (Rissik Street) and the M11 road (Klein Street), becoming Saratoga Avenue and separating Hillbrow from the Johannesburg CBD. It passes under the M31 road (Joe Slovo Drive) adjacent to the University of Johannesburg campus in Doornfontein.

Just after Doornfontein (north of Ellis Park), it becomes two one-way-streets east-north-eastwards (Berea Road eastwards and Gordon Road westwards). It passes through Bertrams and Bezuidenhout Valley, becoming one street (Homestead Avenue), to reach its end at another junction with the M18 road (Observatory Road) adjacent to Bezuidenhout Park in the suburb of Observatory.
