= Ferreirasdorp =

- Location within Gauteng Location within South Africa
- Coordinates: 26.208°S 28.033°E
- Country: South Africa
- Province: Gauteng
- Municipality: City of Johannesburg
- Main Place: Johannesburg
- Established: 1886

Area
  - Total: 0.42 km^{2} (0.16 sq mi)

Population (2011)
  - Total: 625
  - Density: 1,500/km^{2} (3,900/sq mi)

Racial makeup (2011)
  - Black African: 73.6%
  - Coloured: 3.4%
  - Indian/Asian: 20.5%
  - White: 2.2%
  - Other: 0.3%

First languages (2011)
  - English: 25.0%
  - Zulu: 17.1%
  - Tswana: 12.3%
  - Northern Sotho: 10.2%
  - Other: 35.4%
- Time zone: UTC+2 (SAST)
- Postal code (street): 2001
- PO box: 2048

Ferreirasdorp (or Ferreirastown) is an inner-city suburb of Johannesburg, South Africa located in Region F of the City of Johannesburg Metropolitan Municipality.

First known as Ferreira's Camp (Afrikaans: Ferreiraskamp) and later Ferreira's Township, it is the oldest part of Johannesburg. Sometimes referred to as the "cradle of Johannesburg", it is where the first gold diggings started, and where the first diggers initially settled. The city grew around the mining camp in the Ferreirasdorp area, and Johannesburg’s Main Street developed from a rough track where the present Albert Street led off towards Ferreira’s Camp. The area, together with Marshalltown was previously home to a large concentration of Eastern European Jewish immigrants. As the community's economic position improved, they mostly migrated to more middle-class Jewish areas such as Doornfontein, Hillbrow and Yeoville.

The suburb is named after Colonel Ignatius Ferreira, leader of the original group of diggers who settled in this area in 1886.

== History ==
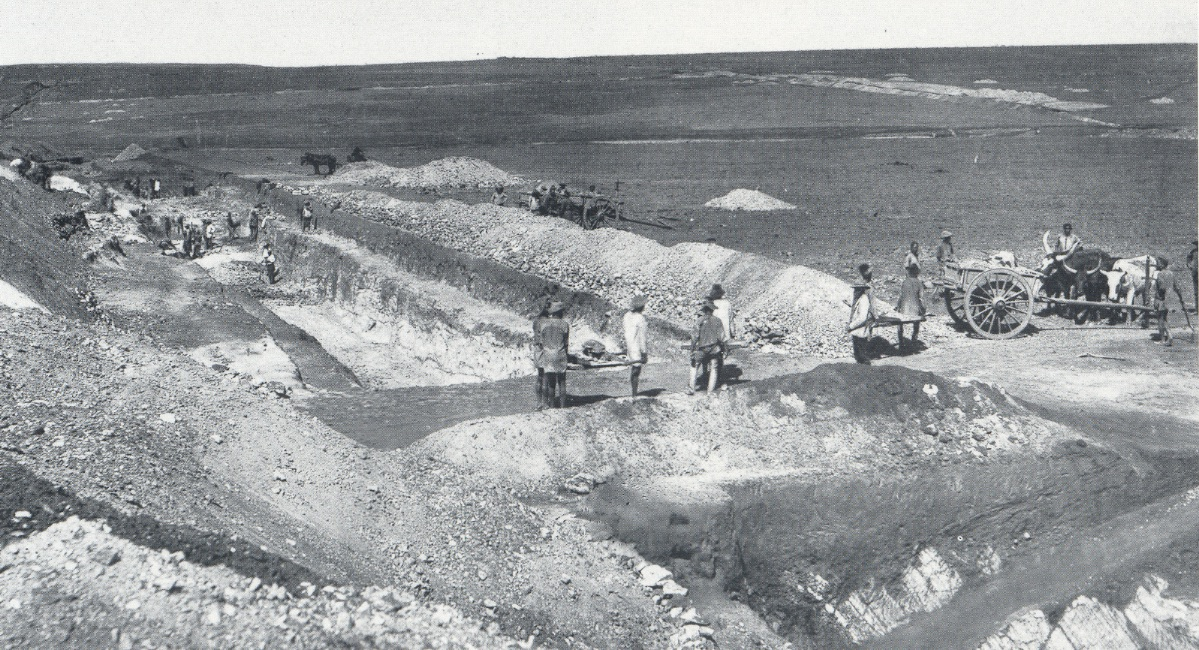
Ferreira's Gold Mine in 1886

The suburb's origins lie in the Turffontein farm set up by Colonel Ignatius Ferreira, a Boer adventurer from Cape Colony. Ferreira had acquired a dozen claims in the vicinity and opened the reef in a cutting. The ore from both sides had a high gold content. The first tent on the site was erected in 1886, two months before gold digging started in earnest.

In 1886 Hans Sauer, who combined a medical practice with prospecting on Cecil Rhodes’s behalf, was guided from Ferreira’s Camp to the main group of gold reefs by a son of the widow Petronella Oosthuizen, the owner of a farm at Langlaagte, on which the main gold reefs had first been discovered.

Following reports of new gold finds in the Witwatersrand, Rhodes and Rudd set off for Ferreira's camp. Already at the time of Rhodes' visit, a little crowd of diggers were at work, and in the week that had passed since Sauer had been away, an Englishwoman had run up a reed and mud building called Walker's Hotel.

Within a fortnight of Rhodes' arrival in July 1886, Ferreira's camp was crowded with tents and wagons from across southern Africa. The tent town eventually became known as Ferreira’s Camp. In July, the Diamond Fields Advertiser was already reporting that the population of Ferreira's Town was 300 persons.

Gold was discovered in September 1886. On September 8, 1886, Landrost Carl von Brandis read President Paul Kruger’s proclamation, confirming the gold fields of the Rand as public diggings. When, in November 1886, a portion of the farm Randjeslaagte had been laid out as a village and named Johannesburg, the Government took over Ferreira's camp and had it properly surveyed and named Ferreira's Township.

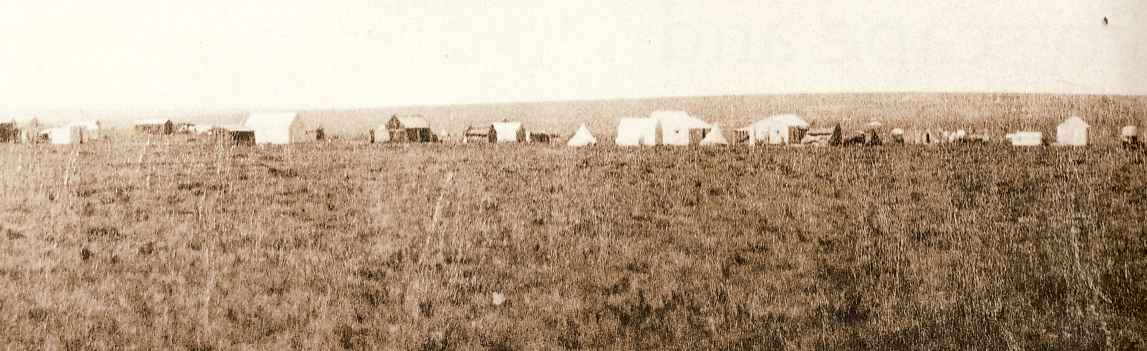
Ferreira's Camp in 1886

The first building to go up in Johannesburg, the Central Hotel, was located in Ferreira’s Camp. The first barber shop in Johannesburg, the first bar, the first pub and the first brothel were all opened in Ferreira's Camp. So were the first circus, Fillis's Circus (in September 1886); the first café, Café Francais (in 1886), and the first school (in November 1886). It was also the location of the first bank branch on the Witwatersrand gold fields, when Standard Bank started doing business in a tent in Ferreira's Camp, in 1886. On 11 October 1887, Ferreirasdorp was incorporated into Johannesburg.

As the city expanded, Ferreirasdorp quickly degenerated into a slum. By the 1890s, the western side of Commissioner street, where the Johannesburg Central Police Station is now located, had developed a reputation for its brothels and the gangs that controlled them. The name Ferreirasdorp itself ultimately became "synonymous with practically everything that is vile and violent" about Johannesburg.

By the turn of the century, many contemporary sources referred to the western part of Ferreirasdorp as the 'Cantonese quarter'. The area became home to a large coloured community, and in 1898 a site was set aside for a church (St. Alban’s Anglican Mission Church) to service the coloured Anglican community. In 1925, the Communist Party of South Africa opened a school offering night classes to blacks, but it was closed during the party purges of the 1930s. In the 1960s, under the Group Areas Act, the coloured community was forcibly moved.

== Jewish community ==
In the late nineteenth century, a significant number of Eastern European Jewish immigrants settled in the area and neighbouring Marshalltown. The community was mostly impoverished and the Adath Ysroel Orthodox Synagogue was built to meet the spiritual needs of the burgeoning community in the district. It was uncommon for the district's Jewish residents to work as miners, but most provided goods and services to the nearby mines. The district was also a point of interaction between the impoverished Jewish immigrants and the poverty-stricken black mine-workers.

The economic situation of much of the Jewish residents improved, as they became shopkeepers and artisans. This allowed these residents to leave the poor conditions of the district and migrate to middle-class Jewish areas such as Doornfontein, Hillbrow and Yeoville.

== Heritage sites ==
A number of cultural heritage sites are present in the area:

- The location of the Ferreira’s Camp, i.e. the area bounded by Commissioner, Ferreira, Alexander and Frederick Streets.
- The location of the Ferreira’s wagon (apparently in the vicinity of today's Wesleyan Girls Hostel).
- Ferreira’s Mine stope, preserved within the Standard Bank precinct as one of Johannesburg’s first sub-surface digging mines. Standard Bank was the first bank to establish itself in Johannesburg, in October 1886. In 1986, exactly one hundred years after the mine (and Standard Bank) started in Johannesburg, Standard Bank built its head office over this mine.
- St. Alban's Mission Church, founded in 1898 to serve the local Coloured Anglican community, designed by F.L.H. Fleming.
- Chancellor House, where Nelson Mandela and Oliver Tambo had their first law practice.
