= N12 Southern Bypass (Johannesburg) =

Road in South Africa

National route N12

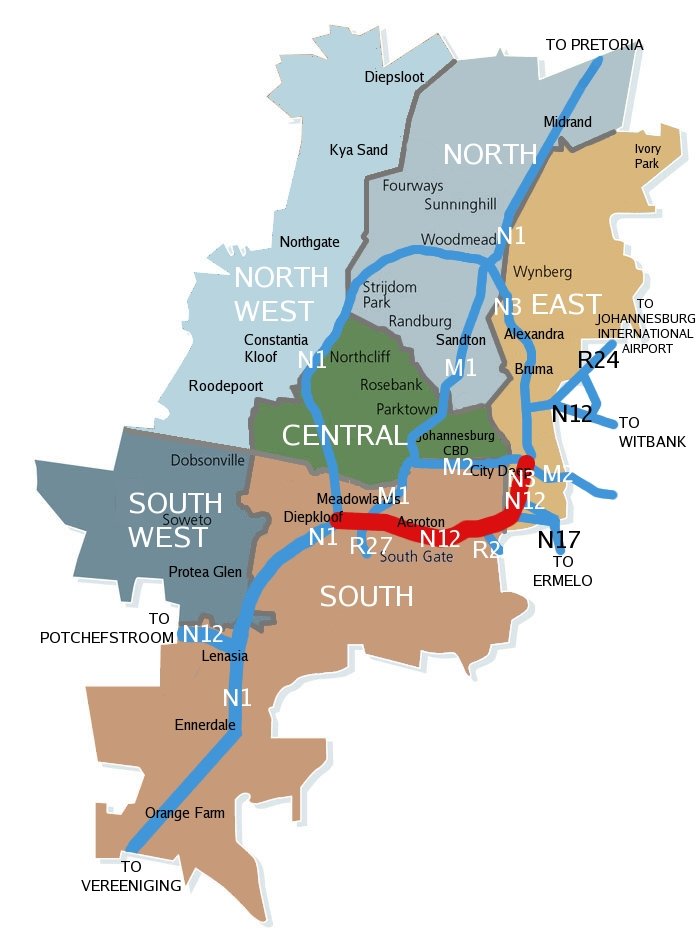

Route information
- Length: 20.4 km (12.7 mi)
- Existed: 1986–present

Major junctions
- West end: N1 Diepkloof Interchange
- M1 Uncle Charlies Interchange; M17 Xavier Street, Ridgeway; M7 Kliprivier Drive, Suideroord; M11 Comaro Street, Oakdene; R59 Reading Interchange, Alberton; R103 / M31 Voortrekker Road, Alberton; N17 Elands Interchange, Germiston
- east end: N3 Elands Interchange, Germiston

Location
- Country: South Africa

Highway system
- Numbered routes of South Africa

The N12 Southern Bypass is a section of the Johannesburg Ring Road that forms a beltway around the city of Johannesburg, South Africa, as part of the N12. The freeway was the last section of the Ring Road to be built, with the final section opening in 1986. As part of the old South African Freeways, It was initially called the N13. The entire Southern Bypass freeway was an e-toll highway (with open road tolling) from 3 December 2013 to 11 April 2024.

From the west, the Southern Bypass begins at the Diepkloof Interchange, where it splits from the N1 freeway. It ends at the Elands Interchange, where it merges with the N3 freeway to be cosigned with it on the N3 Eastern Bypass northwards. The exits include the M1 Uncle Charlie's Interchange (north eastbound only), M17 Xavier Street, M7 Kliprivier Drive, M11 Comaro Road, R59 Reading Interchange, and R103/M31 Voortrekker Road (Alberton).

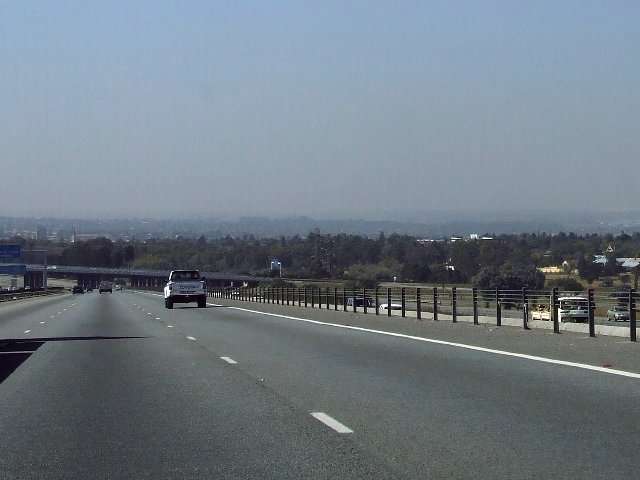
The N12 freeway eastbound near Alberton

The N12 Southern Bypass, which cuts a concrete swath through the rocky hills of southern Johannesburg, is apparently very reminiscent of the freeways of Los Angeles, and together with Johannesburg's sunshine, renders a real Southern California feel to that part of the city.

== Background ==
As with the N1 Western Bypass, the freeway was built with concrete between Reading and Diepkloof and has always been three lanes wide in either direction, fanning out into four lanes at Reading. The freeway passes through a declared green belt area to the south of Johannesburg, which has prevented the construction of billboards along the roadside, a common practice in the city.
