= N3 Eastern Bypass (Johannesburg) =

Road in South Africa

National route N3

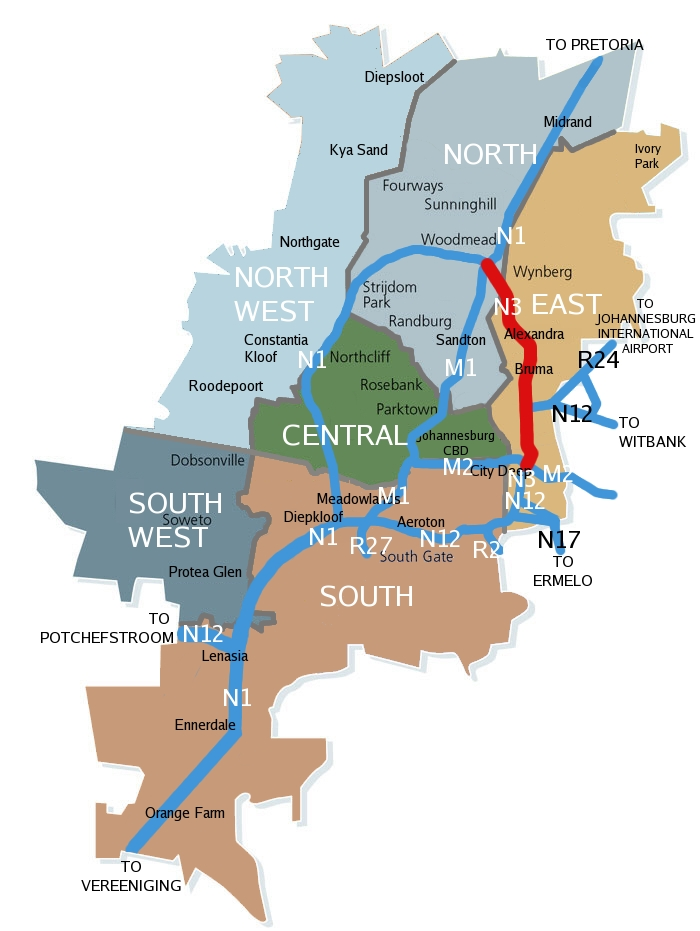

Route information
- Length: 24.9 km (15.5 mi)

Major junctions
- North end: N1 / M1 Buccleuch Interchange
- M60 Marlboro M54 Alexandra; R25 Greenstone; M16 Edenvale; N12 / R24 Bedfordview M52 Bedfordview; M2 Germiston
- South end: N12 Elands Interchange

Location
- Country: South Africa

Highway system
- Numbered routes of South Africa

The N3 Eastern Bypass is a section of the Johannesburg Ring Road that forms a beltway around the city of Johannesburg, South Africa, as part of the N3. The first section of the freeway opened in 1971, from Buccleuch to the interchange with Main Reef Road in Germiston. This is one reason why Germiston is listed as the southbound destination of this route, from the Buccleuch to Geldenhuys Interchanges, rather than to the Elands Interchange south of Germiston. The remaining section from Main Reed Road to Black Reef Road (Rand Airport Road), which included the construction of the Geldenhuys Interchange, was opened in 1977, linking the Eastern Bypass with the N3 freeway to Heidelberg. The interchange at Main Reef Road was removed and Main Reef Road is now an overbridge.

Much of the highway forms a border between Johannesburg and Ekurhuleni. From the south, the Eastern Bypass begins at the Elands Interchange, where it merges with the N12 Southern Bypass. It ends at the Buccleuch Interchange, where it merges with the N1 Western Bypass and M1 freeways. Other exits include M46 Rand Airport Road (southbound only), M2 motorway Johannesburg/Germiston (Geldenhuys Interchange), M52 Van Buuren Road, R24 OR Tambo Int'l Airport / N12 eMalahleni (George Bizos Interchange), M16 Linksfield Road, R25 Modderfontein Road, M54 London Road, and M60 Marlboro Road.

The entire Eastern Bypass was part of the Gauteng e-Toll Project and had open road tolling from 3 December 2013 up until e-tolls were discontinued in Gauteng on 12 April 2024.
