= M1 (Johannesburg) =

Freeway in Johannesburg, South Africa

Metropolitan route M1

Route information
- Maintained by Johannesburg Roads Agency and GDRT
- Length: 29.6 km (18.4 mi)
- Existed: 1967–present

Major junctions
- North end: N1 Western Bypass and N3 Eastern Bypass near Buccleuch
- R55 Woodmead Drive; M60 Marlboro Drive; M40 Grayston Drive; M30 Corlett Drive; M31 Atholl-Oaklands Road; M20 Glenhove Road Extension; R25 11th Avenue (M1 Northbound only); M16 Riviera Road; M31 Houghton Drive/Joe Slovo Drive (M1 Southbound Only); M9 Oxford Road (M1 Northbound Only); M27 Jan Smuts Avenue; M71 Empire Road; M10 Smit Street; Carr Street (M1 Northbound only); M2 Village Road Selby and M2 Motorway; M2 Crown Interchange; M27 Booysens Road; M17 Xavier Road; R553 Golden Highway (M1 Southbound Only); N12 Uncle Charlies Interchange (M1 Southbound Only) M68 Columbine Avenue
- South end: R82 in Meredale, Johannesburg

Location
- Country: South Africa

Highway system
- Numbered routes of South Africa
→ M2

The M1 De Villiers Graaff motorway is a metropolitan route and major freeway in the City of Johannesburg, South Africa. The highway connects the southern areas (including Booysens, Eldorado Park and Soweto) with the city centre and extends further north through Sandton into the Ben Schoeman Highway towards Pretoria. Construction began in 1962 and resulted in the demolition of many properties and houses including numerous historical Parktown Mansions. The highway is named after South African politician De Villiers Graaff.

== Route ==
The M1 officially starts at the M68 (Columbine Avenue) Interchange in Southgate, Johannesburg South, just east of the Southgate Shopping Centre and west of Mondeor. South of this interchange, it is designated as the R82 towards Walkerville and Vereeniging. The M1 begins by heading northwards from the M68 off-ramp to reach the Uncle Charlie's Interchange with the N12 highway (Southern Bypass) in Ridgeway (west southbound interchange only).

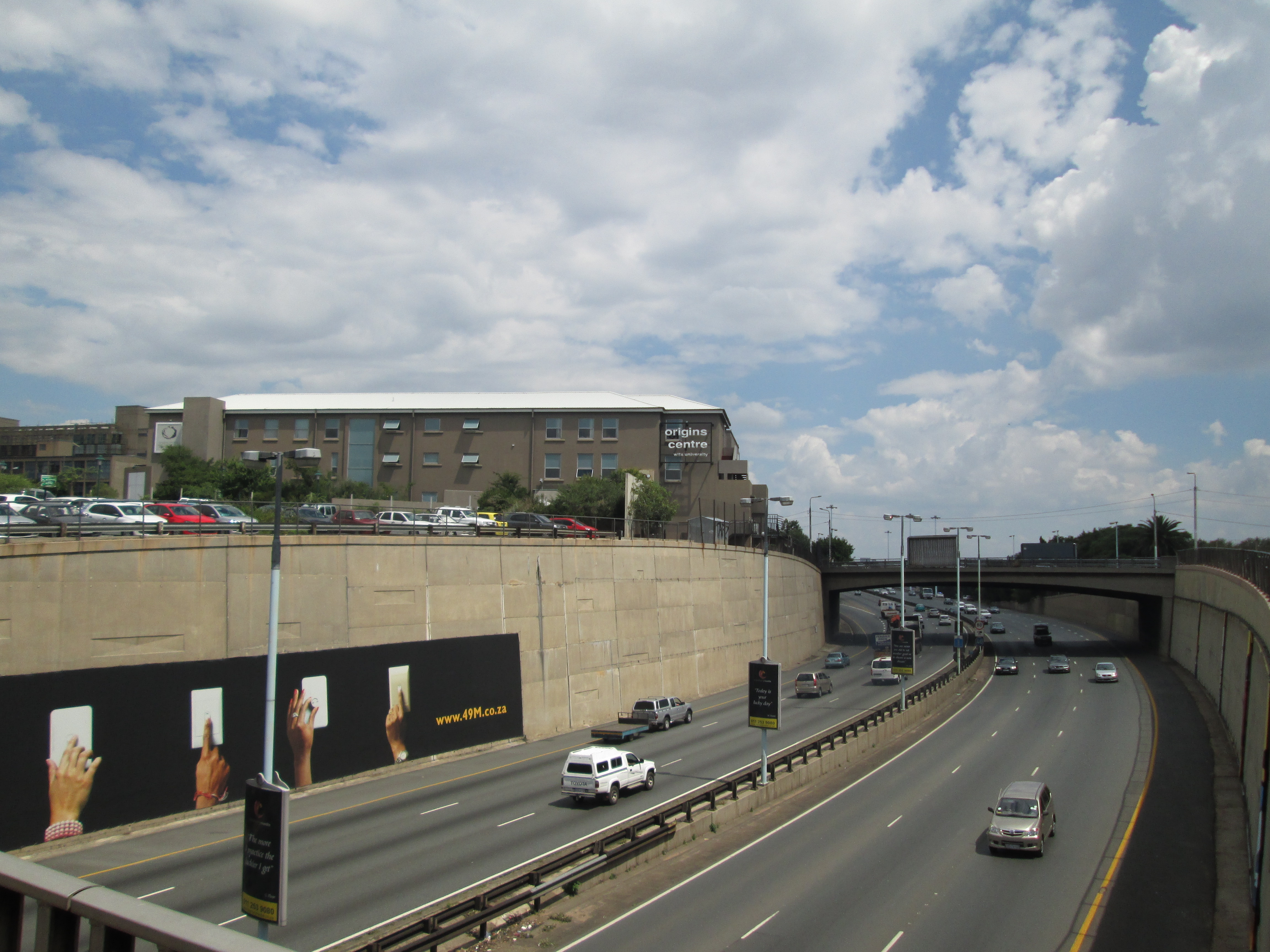
The M1 as it passes between the east and west campuses of the University of the Witwatersrand.

It continues north-east towards the city centre as a freeway, passing Ormonde and Booysens, and meets the M2 highway (Francis Oberholzer Freeway) at the Crown Interchange (which is immediately south-west of the Johannesburg CBD). The M1 then proceeds north-north-east through the leafy northern suburbs of Johannesburg such as Parktown, and the industrial area separating Sandton and Alexandra.

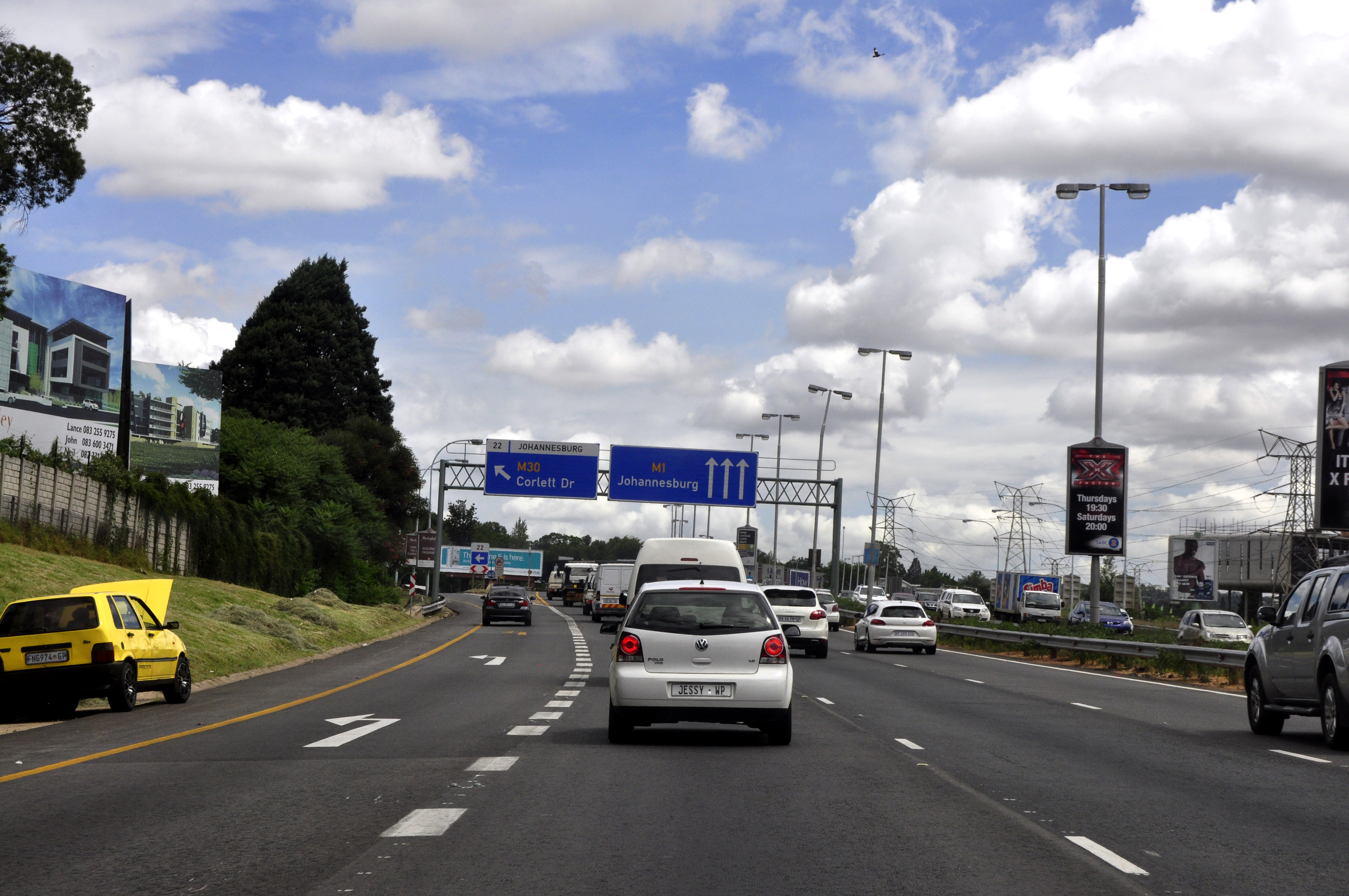
The M1 freeway southbound at the M30 Corlett Drive exit

The M1's northern terminus is at the Buccleuch Interchange, where it meets with the N1 (Western Bypass) and the N3 (Eastern Bypass) highways of Johannesburg and becomes the Ben Schoeman Highway (N1) to Pretoria.

The part of the M1 in Sandton, between Corlett Drive and the Buccleuch Interchange is maintained by SANRAL. Signage and extra lanes have been upgraded in 2010 with the "Gauteng Freeway Improvement Project" (GFIP). The section between Corlett Drive and a portion south of the CBD is maintained by the Johannesburg Roads Agency (JRA) with the remainder to the South also maintained by the provincial government. The northern section maintained by the Gauteng Provincial Government is also designated the P206-1.

Speed limits, which are strictly enforced, change as one gets nearer to the centre of Johannesburg, from 100 km/h in the northern section, beginning at the Buccleuch interchange, finally dropping to 80 km/h near the city centre. South of the CBD, the speed limit again increases. Before an upgrade in 2012, the speed limit was 120 km/h on the provincial government maintained stretch in Sandton, dropping to 100 km/h as it ran through the Northern Suburbs of Johannesburg (from the start of the JRA maintained section before Corlett Drive). However, subsequent to rehabilitation work in 2012, the limit in the northern section was also dropped to 100 km/h.

== History ==
=== Background ===
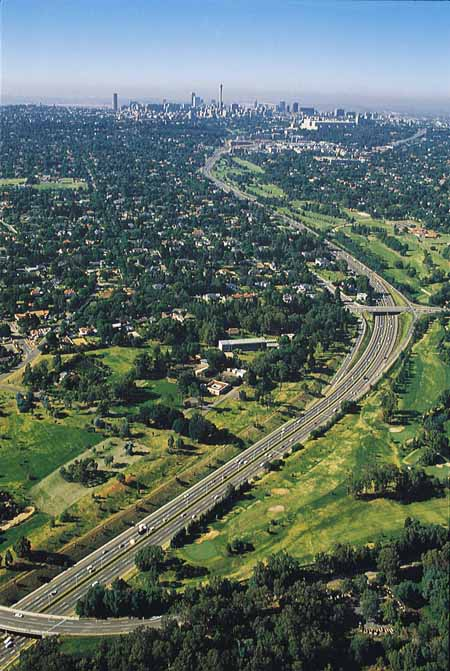
Aerial view from the north

Both the M1 and M2 motorways have their beginnings in a 1948 traffic planning scheme developed by the Johannesburg City Council and examined by American traffic engineering consultant Lloyd B. Reid in 1954. Two 10-year plans examined among other things the idea of new urban motorways and improving existing highways. The plan called for two motorways, one running east–west along the southern CBD and the other running to north–south on the western side of the CBD. The plan was linked to national and provincial governments plan by the National Transport Commission for the Western and Eastern Bypasses, the future N1 and N3 in northern Johannesburg.

The plan for the original motorway began in Bramley at Corlett Drive and headed south through Killarney and Parktown before cutting through the ridge between the University of the Witwatersrand and the Milner Park Agricultural Showgrounds and then over the Braamfontein railway yards through Newtown to the east–west interchange. From there it would cross Crown Mines land and head southwards past Robertsham to another proposed interchange and future Western Bypass (N12) before ending at the beginning of the Kimberley Road.

Ground was broken for the new North-South Motorway on 28 May 1962 by Transport Minister Ben Schoeman, Administrator of the Transvaal, F.H. Odendaal and Johannesburg Mayor, Keith Flemming, just north of the Braamfontein Yards, site of the first bridge on the elevated motorway. The first section would be opened in the CBD in 1967 and rest of the motorway between 1972 and 1974.

A two three-lane motorway was planned with large medians for breakdowns, elevated in the Central business district (CBD) as it crossed the Braamfontein railway yards and then became a double-decker motorway south through to an interchange near Westgate where it met the East-West Motorway (M2). The speed limit was set at between 80 km/h (50 mph) in the city, increased to 100 km/h (60 mph) and was set to reach 110 km/h (70 mph) the further one proceeded from the CBD.

The motorway is named after the white South African opposition leader and United Party head, Sir De Villiers Graaff.

=== Construction ===
==== 1956 ====
An early long-term motorway plan was envisaged for a future Johannesburg. The first was a north–south motorway of 18.4 km stretching from Westgate just south of the Johannesburg CBD to connect up with the existing main Pretoria Road, 5.6 km outside the Johannesburg municipal boundary in the northern suburbs. The Westgate section would connect up with an east/west motorway running just south of the Johannesburg CBD. A third section involved the reconfiguration of roads to form an eastern CBD bypass connecting the north–south motorway with Saratoga Avenue.

==== 1958 ====
Improvements began on Harrow Road (Joe Slovo Drive) to widen and deepen the road and included new bridges crossing over it at Joel Road, Alexandra Street and Barnato Street. Where Harrow Street met Louis Botha Avenue in Berea, this was to become an underpass of the latter. At the southern end of Harrow Road, a flyover would cross Saratoga Avenue and would eventually connect with the redesigned Siemert and Sivewright Roads.

==== 1959 ====
Planning began for six-lane bridge that would have to cross the Braamfontein Railway Yard and would be part of the M1 motorway to connect the city with its northern and southern suburbs.

==== 1962 ====
Construction finally began in 1962 on the Braamfontein Railway Bridge in Braamfontein required to connect the future M1 north and southern motorways. The Johannesburg City Engineer Department began its planning for the M1 motorway, that included a motorway from the Braamfontein Railway Bridge under construction, south to a future Westgate Interchange and included a double-decker section above Goch Street.

The construction on the Sivewright Road / Berea Street and the Siemert Road / End Street reconfiguration, important to connecting the future eastern bypass connecting the M1 in the northern suburbs at the proposed Killarney interchange with the M2 East at the proposed Heidelberg Interchange, was nearing completion. Both road reconfigurations were situated in Doornfontein, east of the Johannesburg CBD.

==== 1963 ====
The Johannesburg City Engineer Department continued its engineering work on plans for Goch Street double-decker section of the future M1 North route. Planning also started on a future M1 South bridge and interchange at Xavier Street in Robertsham.

==== 1964 ====
Johannesburg City Engineer Department's planning was completed on the Goch Street double-decker section on the future M1 northern route. The design called for a 1,100 m section made up of a 500m double-decker motorway and two 300m sections on either end of the main section.

Planning begun on the M1 motorway, heading northwards, in Braamfontein to construct a cutting through what then was known as the University Ridge. This route would separate the Witwatersrand Agricultural Society grounds and the University of Witwatersrand. Also planned was a forty-metre bridge allowing Showground Road (now Enoch Sontonga Avenue) to cross the new motorway slightly south of the new cutting.

Other essential road changes became important in accessing the planned motorways. Booysens Road was widened to become a dual carriageway to connect with the future M1 on its southern route. The Harrow Road (Joe Slovo Drive) scheme was completed. Work continued on the Berea-Sivewright motorway bypass works.

==== 1965-1966 ====
On the M1 motorway northern route, contracts were awarded for work from Braamfontein through University Ridge to Rockridge Road in Parktown. As the motorway was to cross under Jan Smuts Avenue on this section, work was begun on an underpass. Work that had started on the eastern-bypass, the Berea-Sivewright Street section, was completed.

At the southern end of the M1 Goch Street double-decker section, work began on the Westgate Interchange that would connect the M1 and M2 motorways, but work was problematic when mine workings below the site became an issue.

On the M1 southern section, work was begun on the Xavier Street Bridge and the Crown Gardens Interchange. While on the M1 northern section just past the end of the new Braamfontein Railway bridge, work started on the Smit Street Interchange in Braamfontein.

==== 1968 ====
On the M1 North, the Goch Street double decker and its two ends, a connection to a future Westgate Interchange and Braamfontein Railway bridge, were completed. Kimberly Road reconfiguration was also completed and would connect the road to the M1 South at the southern end of the motorway on the latter's completion. Work on the Siemert Road / End Street route making up part of the eastern bypass was completed. Empire Road and Oxford Road's connections to the M1 northern route had been realigned and re-orientated.

==== 1969 ====
In March 1969, the 2.4 km West Street to Braamfontein connection begun on the remaining sections, costing R10.3 million of which the land cost R2 million, that would connect both the M1 and M2. During October 1969, the M1 northern motorway section from De Korte Street in Braamfontein to Sherbourne Avenue, Parktown was opened.

==== 1970 ====
In February 1970 the Smit Street off-ramp, just north of Braamfontein Railway Bridge, opened connecting the M1 to Braamfontein. Project work on part of the eastern bypass to connect the M1 North with M2 east was completed on Siemert Road and End Street and was awaiting the completion of the Heidelberg Interchange.

==== 1971 ====
In January 1971 construction started on the last section of the M1 northern motorway from Parktown to Bramley. Construction of the Crown Interchange on the M1/M2 was postponed when the tenders received were consider too expensive. Work began on improving the roads connecting to the M1 on Oxford Avenue, Corlett Drive and Jan Smuts Avenue in Rosebank.

==== 1972 ====
More motorway on the M1 north was opened extending it from Parktown to Houghton when the 11th Avenue (R25) offramps were completed. The Crown Interchange tender on the M1/M2 was finally awarded and a completion date set for 1974. Heidelberg Interchange on the M2 eastern section was opened and connected the eastern CBD bypass to the M1 in the northern suburbs.

==== 1973 ====
M1 in the northern suburbs was extended from Houghton's 11th Avenue (R25) offramp to Glenhove Road in Oaklands. Part of the Crown Interchange connecting to the Westgate Interchange was now open. Work on the M1 South from the Crown Interchange was under construction.

==== 1974 ====
M1 in the northern suburbs was now completed to Bramley at Corlett Drive and connected the motorway and Johannesburg to the Provincial and National government's N1 Ben Schoeman Highway and Pretoria. The M1 South was finally connected to Kimberley Road (now the R553 Golden Highway) on 16 August 1974.

=== Final cost ===
The final cost of the twelve-year M1 and M2 project was R85.5 million through the awarding of twenty-seven contracts. The Provincial and National government's contributed R21 million of the final cost while land acquisitions represented 19% of the final cost. The project moved 8.3 million cubic metres of land made up of 0.3 million cubic metres of rock, 8 million cubic metres of slime and earth. Eighty new bridges were constructed, and ten mine dumps moved. Seventy kilometres of drainage pipes were laid and 500,000 cubic metres of concreted poured.

== Junctions list ==
Municipality	Location	km	mi	Junction	Destinations	Notes
Johannesburg	Johannesburg South	0.0	0.0	1 - Columbine Ave	M68 Soweto, Southgate, Mondeor	
Johannesburg	Johannesburg South	1.4	0.0	2 - Uncle Charlie's Interchange	N12 Southern Bypass	Southbound exit and entry
Johannesburg	Johannesburg South	2.0	0.0	4 - Golden Highway	R553 Southgate, Eldorado Park, Lenasia	Southbound exit and entry
Johannesburg	Johannesburg South	3.8	0.0	5 - Xavier Street	M17 Ormonde, Robertsham, Ridgeway	
Johannesburg	Johannesburg South	5.4	0.0	7 - Booysens Road	M27 Booysens	
Johannesburg	Johannesburg South	7.9	0.0	9 - Roodepoort	M2 West to Crown, City West, Mayfair, Roodepoort	
Johannesburg	Johannesburg CBD	8.5	0.0	10 - City	M2 East	Northbound exit and entry
Johannesburg	Johannesburg CBD	0.0	0.0	10C - City	M2 West	Southbound exit and entry
Johannesburg	Johannesburg CBD	10.1	0.0	11 - Carr Street	Newtown, Fordsburg, Johannesburg CBD	Northbound exit only, Southbound entrance
Johannesburg	Johannesburg CBD	10.6	0.0	12 - Smit Street	M10 Braamfontein, Hillbrow, Johannesburg CBD	
Johannesburg	Parktown	11.5	0.0	13 - Empire Road	M71 Parktown, Braamfontein, Hillbrow	Northbound exit only, Southbound entrance and exit
Johannesburg	Parktown	12.1	0.0	14A - Jan Smuts Avenue	M27 Parktown	
Johannesburg	Parktown	12.8	0.0	14B - St Andrews Road	Parktown	Northbound entrance, Southbound exit
Johannesburg	Forrest Town	13.2	0.0	15 - Oxford Road	M9 Forrest Town	Northbound exit, Southbound entrance
Johannesburg	Houghton	15.0	0.0	16 - 1st Avenue	M16 Houghton Estate	Southbound exit M31 Houghton Drive, Houghton
Johannesburg	Houghton	16.0	0.0	17 - Riviera Road	M16 Killarney, Houghton Estate	Northbound entrance, Southbound exit
Johannesburg	Houghton	16.0	0.0	17 - 11th Avenue	R25 Riviera, Houghton Estate	Northbound exit, Southbound entrance
Johannesburg	Melrose	16.4	0.0	19 - Glenhove Road	M20 Melrose, Oaklands	
Johannesburg	Melrose	18.6	0.0	20 - Atholl / Oaklands Road	Melrose North, Abbottsford	
Johannesburg	Bramley	20.0	0.0	22 - Corlett Drive	M30 Inanda, Melrose North, Bramley	
Johannesburg	Sandton	22.3	0.0	23 - Grayston Drive	M40 Sandton, Atholl Gardens, Wynberg, Alexandra	
Johannesburg	Sandton	24.5	0.0	26 - Marlboro Drive	M60 Morningside, Sandown, Wendywood, Marlboro	
Johannesburg	Sandton	27.6	0.0	29 - Woodmead Drive	R55 Wendywood, Woodmead, Buccleuch	
Johannesburg	Buccleuch	29.2	0.0	104A - Buccleuch Interchange	N1 Western Bypass	Northbound exit, Southbound entry
Johannesburg	Buccleuch	29.8	0.0	104B - Buccleuch Interchange	N3 Eastern Bypass	Northbound exit, Southbound entry - M1 ends and route continues as the N1 Ben Schoeman Highway
1.000 mi = 1.609 km; 1.000 km = 0.621 mi	Buccleuch					

== Traffic ==
The M1 Motorway, after it opened in 1974, was already carrying around 40,000 vehicles a day in each direction while near the central CBD area, 5,500 vehicles per hour were being recorded.

=== Congestion ===
The M1 experiences significant traffic congestion during a typical rush hour. Several public transport systems, including bus rapid transit and the Gautrain railway system, aim to alleviate some of the traffic on the M1.

== See also ==
- Grayston Pedestrian and Cycle Bridge
