= Springfield, Gauteng =

Springfield
- Location within Gauteng Location within South Africa
- Coordinates: 26.228°S 28.049°E
- Country: South Africa
- Province: Gauteng
- Municipality: City of Johannesburg
- Main Place: Johannesburg
- Established: 1906

Area
  - Total: 0.42 km^{2} (0.16 sq mi)

Population (2011)
  - Total: 31
  - Density: 74/km^{2} (190/sq mi)

Racial makeup (2011)
  - Black African: 83.9%
  - White: 16.1%

First languages (2011)
  - Zulu: 61.3%
  - English: 16.1%
  - Swazi: 6.5%
  - Tsonga: 6.5%
  - Other: 9.7%
- Time zone: UTC+2 (SAST)
- Postal code (street): 2190
- PO box: 2137

Springfield is a suburb of Johannesburg, South Africa. It is a small industrial suburb located south of the Johannesburg CBD, close to La Rochelle. It is located in Region F of the City of Johannesburg Metropolitan Municipality.

== History ==
Prior to the discovery of gold on the Witwatersrand in 1886, the suburb lay on land on one of the original farms called Turffontein. Springfield became a suburb in 1906.
