= City and Suburban, Gauteng =

City and Suburban
- Location within Gauteng Location within South Africa
- Coordinates: 26.208°S 28.055°E
- Country: South Africa
- Province: Gauteng
- Municipality: City of Johannesburg
- Established: 1896

Area
  - Total: 1.07 km^{2} (0.41 sq mi)

Population (2011)
  - Total: 2,719
  - Density: 2,540/km^{2} (6,580/sq mi)

Racial makeup (2011)
  - Black African: 99.4%
  - Coloured: 0.3%
  - Indian/Asian: 0.1%
  - White: 0.2%
  - Other: 0.1%

First languages (2011)
  - Zulu: 53.9%
  - English: 7.3%
  - Xhosa: 5.9%
  - Southern Ndebele: 5.4%
  - Other: 27.5%
- Time zone: UTC+2 (SAST)

City and Suburban is a suburb of Johannesburg, South Africa, just east of the city centre. It is a relatively small residential and business area, inhabited by 2 703 (99,4%) an overwhelming Black majority, according to the 2011-census. It is located in Region F of the City of Johannesburg Metropolitan Municipality.

== History ==
The suburb lies in the Johannesburg CBD with Marshalltown to the west and Jeppestown to the east. Prior to the discovery of gold on the Witwatersrand in 1886, the suburb lay on land on one of the original farms that make up Johannesburg, called Doornfontein. Lying close to the Main Reef gold deposits, parts of the farm were proclaimed as gold claims with this suburb was settled by prospectors from Natal and hence called Natal Camp, one of two original camps established, prior to the surveying of Johannesburg, the other being Ferreirasdorp. The area is named after the original mine, City and Suburban Mine, that lay on the southern reaches of the suburb. It was established as a suburb in 1896.
