= Marshalltown, Johannesburg =

Marshalltown
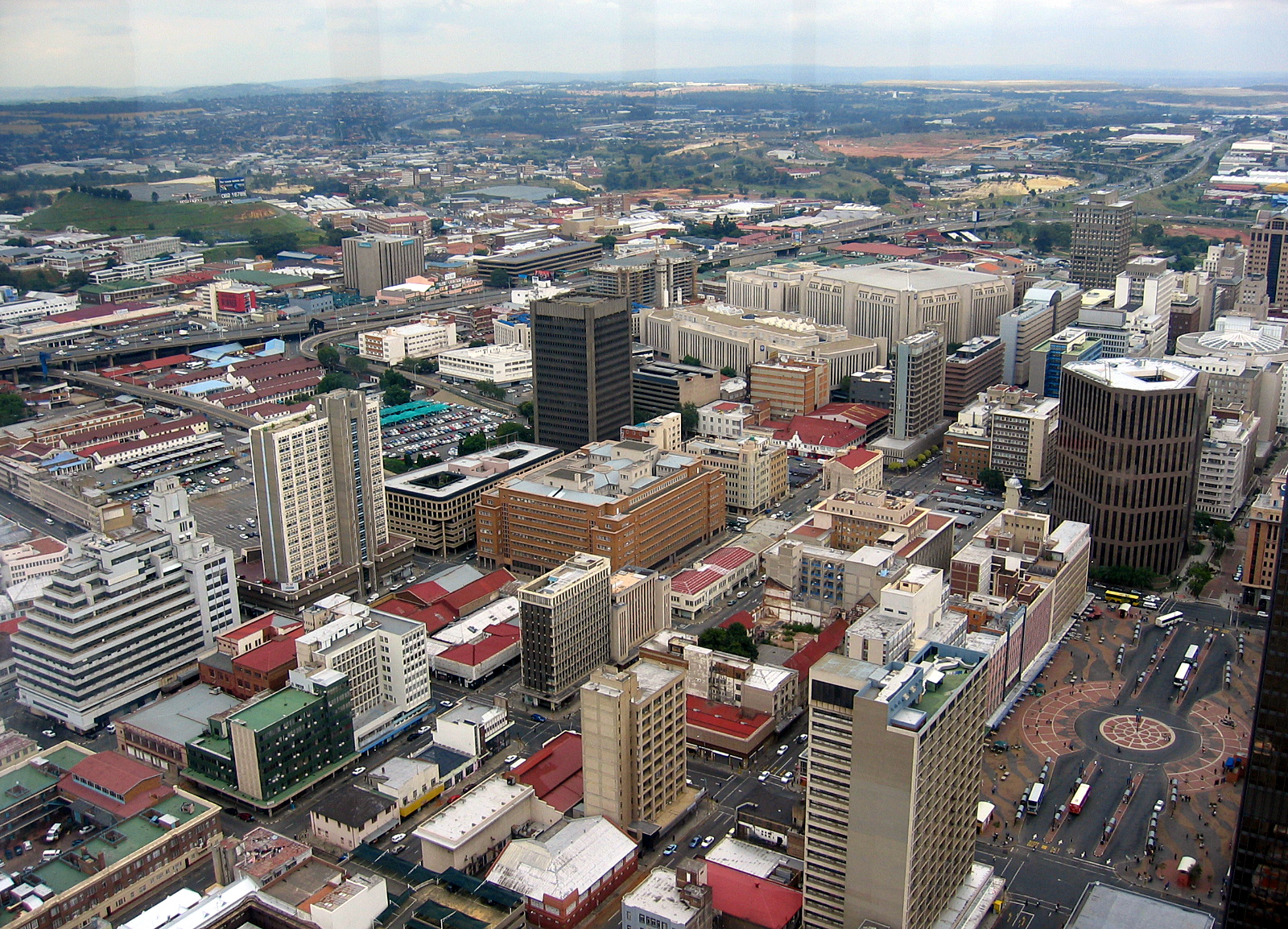
- Marshalltown as seen from the top of the Carlton Centre. The M1 and M2 are behind the large buildings and form the boundary between Marshall town and the southern suburbs.

- Location within Gauteng Location within South Africa
- Coordinates: 26°12′31″S 28°2′46″E
- Country: South Africa
- Province: Gauteng
- Municipality: City of Johannesburg
- Main Place: Johannesburg
  - Councillor: (ANC)

Area
  - Total: 0.65 km^{2} (0.25 sq mi)

Population (2011)
  - Total: 4,512
  - Density: 6,900/km^{2} (18,000/sq mi)

Racial makeup (2011)
  - Black African: 96.6%
  - Coloured: 1.8%
  - Indian/Asian: 0.8%
  - White: 0.7%
  - Other: 0.1%

First languages (2011)
  - Zulu: 31.2%
  - English: 12.9%
  - Xhosa: 11.9%
  - Sotho: 7.2%
  - Other: 36.8%
- Time zone: UTC+2 (SAST)
- Postal code (street): 2001
- PO box: 2107
- Website: http://www.sa-venues.com/attractionsga/marshalltown.php

Marshalltown is a suburb of Johannesburg, South Africa. It is located in Region F of the City of Johannesburg Metropolitan Municipality.

The area, together with Ferreirasdorp was previously home to a large concentration of Eastern European Jewish immigrants. As the community's economic position improved, they mostly migrated to more middle-class Jewish areas such as Doornfontein, Hillbrow and Yeoville.

== History ==
The suburb has its origin as farmland owned by Frederick Bezuidenhout Junior. This small strip of land on the farm Turffontein, was adjacent to the South African Republic-owned land of Randjeslaagte, which was to be proclaimed as the township of Johannesburg on 8 November 1886. The land was purchased by two businessmen, Henry Brown Marshall and his brother-in-law William M'Laren, in September 1886. The land would eventually be quickly surveyed with 553 stands and one market square which would later be known as Marshall Square. At the time, the township's name was known as Marshall's Dorp. By 26 November 1887, the township's boundaries were incorporated into Johannesburg. They would establish a brewery on eight stands in Marshalltown but sold it in 1894. The brewery's logo consisted of three castles and would eventually become part of South African Breweries.

In August 2023 the 2023 Johannesburg building fire took place.

=== Jewish community ===
In the late nineteenth century, a significant number of Eastern European Jewish immigrants settled in the area and neighbouring Ferreirasdorp. The community was mostly impoverished and the Adath Ysroel Orthodox Synagogue was built to meet the spiritual needs of the burgeoning community in the district. It was uncommon for the district's Jewish residents to work as miners, but most provided goods and services to the nearby mines. The district was also a point of interaction between the impoverished Jewish immigrants and the poverty-stricken black mine-workers.

The economic situation of much of the Jewish residents improved, as they became shopkeepers and artisans. This allowed these residents to leave the poor conditions of the district and migrate to middle-class Jewish areas such as Doornfontein, Hillbrow and Yeoville.
