= Waverley, Johannesburg =

Waverley
- Location within Gauteng Location within South Africa
- Coordinates: 26°08′10″S 28°4′42″E
- Country: South Africa
- Province: Gauteng
- Municipality: City of Johannesburg
- Main Place: Johannesburg
- Established: 1903

Area
  - Total: 1.37 km^{2} (0.53 sq mi)

Population (2011)
  - Total: 2,419
  - Density: 1,770/km^{2} (4,570/sq mi)

Racial makeup (2011)
  - Black African: 31.17%
  - Coloured: 0.74%
  - Indian/Asian: 1.74%
  - White: 65.48%
  - Other: 0.91%

First languages (2011)
  - English: 74.35%
  - Afrikaans: 5.59%
  - Zulu: 5.47%
  - Sotho: 0.95%
  - Other: 13.64%
- Time zone: UTC+2 (SAST)
- Postal code (street): 2090
- PO box: 0135

Waverley is a suburb of Johannesburg, South Africa. A suburb in northern Johannesburg, it is surrounded by Bramley, Highlands North and Savoy Estate. It is located in Region E of the City of Johannesburg Metropolitan Municipality. Waverley is located close to the M1 highway, running North and South through Johannesburg.

== History ==
The suburb is situated on part of an old Witwatersrand farm called Syferfontein. It was proclaimed as a suburb on 9 April 1903. Its name has like many of the suburbs around it, a Scottish theme, named after the novel Waverley by Sir Walter Scott.

== Education ==
The suburb has two schools. Waverley Girls' High School which opened in January 1953. The other is St Mary's School, an Anglican Church girls school which opened on the site in 1934 but whose history goes back to its origins in 1888 in Jeppestown.
