= Robertsham =

- Location within Gauteng Location within South Africa
- Coordinates: 26°14′47″S 28°0′37″E
- Country: South Africa
- Province: Gauteng
- Municipality: City of Johannesburg
- Main Place: Johannesburg
- Established: 1948

Area
  - Total: 3.43 km^{2} (1.32 sq mi)

Population (2011)
  - Total: 6,727
  - Density: 1,960/km^{2} (5,080/sq mi)

Racial makeup (2011)
  - Black African: 17.3%
  - Coloured: 6.4%
  - Indian/Asian: 50.6%
  - White: 23.0%
  - Other: 2.7%

First languages (2011)
  - English: 72.8%
  - Afrikaans: 11.6%
  - Zulu: 3.3%
  - Sotho: 2.5%
  - Other: 9.8%
- Time zone: UTC+2 (SAST)
- Postal code (street): 2091
- PO box: 2175

Robertsham is a suburb of Johannesburg, South Africa. It is situated in the city's southern suburbs just south of the CBD. It is located in Region F of the City of Johannesburg Metropolitan Municipality.

== History ==
The suburb is situated on an old Witwatersrand farm of Ormonde. It was purchased by Kalven Estates in 1948 and proclaimed on 14 April 1948 and would be named after the company's chairman Robert Shapiro. The word -ham, in the United Kingdom and Ireland is a suffix used in place names meaning farm or homestead.

== Education ==
Sir John Adamson Secondary School is located in the area. Robertsham Primary School is located here. Theo Wassenaar Laerskool is a primary school. Alhuda Academy is an Islamic school.
