= Commissioner Street =

Road in Johannesburg

- Street map showing Commissioner Street
- Interactive map of Commissioner Street
- Location: Johannesburg, Gauteng, South Africa
- Coordinates: 26.205696°S 28.040215°E

Commissioner Street is a major one-way street (westwards) in the Central Business District of Johannesburg, South Africa. It runs from the M31 (Joe Slovo Drive; Sivewright Avenue) to the R41 (Main Reef Road), and is indicated as part of the R24. The Carlton Centre, the 5th-tallest building in Africa as of 2024, is located on the street, as is the southern end of Newtown. There is little evidence of Commissioner Street's exact origin, although it is known that this street played a role in the development of Johannesburg.

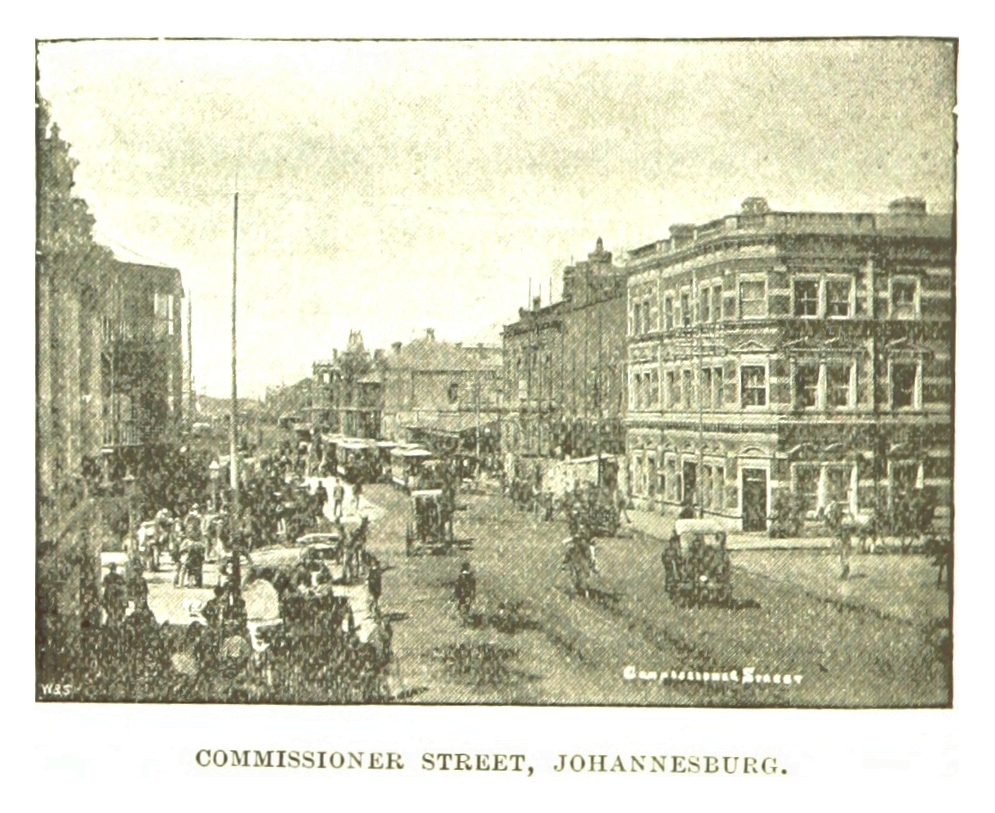
Commissioner Street in 1895

== History ==
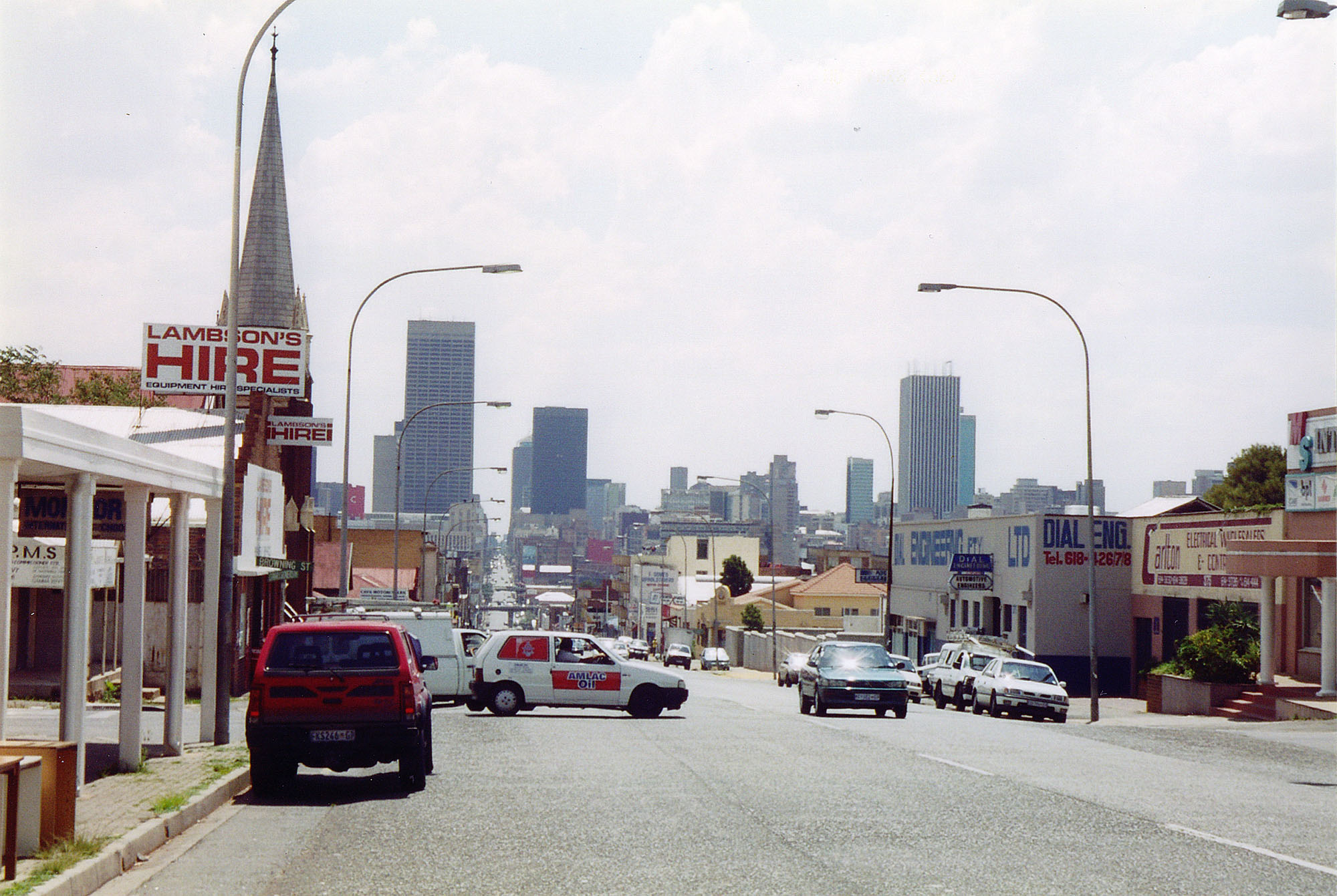
Commissioner Street in 2006

=== Historical events ===
Commissioner Street has been an important street in Johannesburg since the 1800s and has seen many significant events throughout its history.

- In 1886, it was declared that mining would be allowed in Johannesburg. Johannesburg's first chemist was opened soon after the announcement by a Mr. Heymann. The chemist was known as "Golden Mortar Dispensary".
- In May 1896, Carl Hertz bought a projector from England and screened the first movie seen in South Africa at the Empire Palace of Varieties on Commissioner Street. This introduced South Africa to the age of the bioscope.
- On 22 September 1941, Dr Anton Rupert started his first business, the Voorbrand Tobacco Company, in Commissioner Street.
- In 1973, the Carlton Centre, Africa's tallest building opened on Commissioner Street. The building consisted of a hotel, shops and offices. The hotel closed down in 1997 due to urban decay.

=== Chinatown ===
Two Chinatowns are located in the city of Johannesburg, the first Chinatown is located on Commissioner Street and the second is in the suburb of Cyrildene. The last remaining shops and restaurants of Johannesburg's first Chinatown are located between buildings 5 and 17 on the western end of Commissioner Street. It was established in the early 20th century when the first Chinese immigrants settled west of Johannesburg and it is estimated that by 1904 there were 180 Chinese businesses operating in the Newtown area. This Chinatown hosts an annual Chinese New Year celebration on Commissioner Street. Since 1994, it has been affected by urban decay and growing levels of crime, reducing its size. It is also getting smaller due to most of the descendants of the original immigrants now being 2nd and 3rd generation South African Chinese who have started to spread out to do business in other parts of the city and country. Many of the original businesses have moved to other areas in Johannesburg or closed down. The "New Chinatown" established in Cyrildene consists mainly of recent Chinese immigrants.

=== Heritage sites ===
Due to its long history, a number of buildings on Commissioner Street have reached the requirements to be protected as national or provincial heritage sites.

=== Proposed renaming ===
In February 2012, the Premier of Gauteng, Nomvula Mokonyane announced that a proposal to rename Commissioner Street had been brought before the Gauteng Geographical Names Committee. The proposal was to rename the street after Apartheid struggle leader and founding member of the ANC Women's League, Albertina Sisulu. The family of Sisulu welcomed this proposal. The overall plan was for the sections of the R24 route in Johannesburg and Roodepoort to be renamed as Albertina Sisulu Road. Eventually, only the one-way street for the other direction (east), Market Street, was renamed to Albertina Sisulu Road in October 2013 while Commissioner Street was not renamed.
