= JCI Limited =

South African mining business

Johannesburg Consolidated Investment Co. Ltd. (or JCI) was a major South African company founded in 1889 which invested in the mining, property and engineering sectors. After allegations of fraud and mismanagement, the company was closed down in 2011.

== History ==
The company was founded by British entrepreneur Barney Barnato in 1889. Using his investments in the Kimberley diamond fields, particularly his 25% share in De Beers, Barnato invested in the Witwatersrand gold mines. Initially, he bought small but rich mines near Germiston—the New Primrose, named after his daughter—and others in the same region.

In 1913, JCI bought the Randfontein Estates Gold Mining Company from Sir J.B. Robinson. At the peak of its production, Randfontein was equipped with 600 stamp mills, which were reportedly loud enough to be heard in Johannesburg. During the 1930s, Randfontein was the largest gold producer in South Africa; in the 1950s, it was also known for its uranium production.

JCI was also involved with numerous mining ventures—New State Mines at Brakpan, Modder Deep Mines at Benoni, Van Dyk Mines at Benoni. In the 1960s, Randfontein was virtually closed down, and mining was developed at Western Areas on the other side of the shallow valley. However, in the 1970s new deposits were discovered to the south of Randfontein, and the Cooke Section was opened up in 1976. Gold and uranium were extracted from the Cooke Section, with the uranium later being used as fuel for the Koeberg Nuclear Power Station.

In addition to the gold mines, 25% of De Beers and a controlling interest in Rustenburg Platinum Holdings, the world's largest platinum producer, JCI owned large industrial and property holdings, including the Houghton Estate in northern Johannesburg, and substantial shareholdings in other companies, including South African Breweries, Toyota South Africa and Lennings Industrial. This placed them in competition with developers who wanted the property holdings they owned. Anglo American Corporation later purchased a significant holding in JCI.

JCI installed a technically advanced precious metals refinery at Rustenburg, which processed Platinum Group metals completely in South Africa. They also built a ferrochrome smelter at Lydenburg which directly smelted chromite fine ore.

In the late 1980s, JCI started development of South Deep, an ultra deep mine to the south of Western Areas. The ownership of South Deep has now devolved to Gold Fields, and the deposit is still being developed.

In 1995, the majority shareholder, Anglo American Corp., decided to offer JCI to the new political dispensation in South Africa as a Black Economic Empowerment vehicle. A new Chairman, Mzi Khumalo, took over the mining side, whilst the property and investment side was turned into Johnnic Communications. The platinum interests were moved into Anglo American Platinum, Amplats.

== Alleged crimes ==
It has been alleged by Four Corners that Brett Kebble, John Stratton, and others in their roles as Chairman and directors of the company respectively defrauded and conspired to defraud the company of some 7.6 billion rand. Additionally, it was alleged that John Stratton then procured Brett Kebble's murder, with which Glenn Agliotti has been charged.

== See also ==
- MacDuff v JCI.
