= Crown, Gauteng =

Crown
- Location within Gauteng Location within South Africa
- Coordinates: 26°13′26″S 28°00′35″E
- Country: South Africa
- Province: Gauteng
- Municipality: City of Johannesburg
- Main Place: Johannesburg

Area
  - Total: 2.26 km^{2} (0.87 sq mi)

Population (2011)
  - Total: 466
  - Density: 206/km^{2} (534/sq mi)

Racial makeup (2011)
  - Black African: 98.7%
  - Coloured: 1.3%

First languages (2011)
  - Zulu: 22.3%
  - Sotho: 14.6%
  - Xhosa: 13.9%
  - Southern Ndebele: 8.8%
  - Other: 40.3%
- Time zone: UTC+2 (SAST)

Crown is a suburb of Johannesburg, South Africa. It is located in Region F of the City of Johannesburg Metropolitan Municipality. It is immediately south-west of the Johannesburg CBD.
