= M19 (Johannesburg) =

Metropolitan route in the City of Johannesburg, South Africa

Metropolitan route M19

Route information
- Maintained by Johannesburg Roads Agency and Gauteng Department of Roads and Transport

Major junctions
- South end: R29
- North end: M38

Location
- Country: South Africa

Highway system
- Numbered routes of South Africa
← M18	→ M20

The M19 is a short metropolitan route in Johannesburg, South Africa.

== Route ==
The M19 begins at the R29 and ends at the M38.
