= Johannesburg South =

Human settlement in South Africa

Johannesburg South is a group of suburbs in the southern part of Johannesburg, South Africa. It is located in Region F of the City of Johannesburg Metropolitan Municipality.

== Transport ==
=== Roads ===
Johannesburg South mainly lies along the N12 freeway, routing traffic east–west from eMalahleni (via Benoni, Boksburg and Germiston) to Kimberley (via Soweto).
