= Bramley, Gauteng =

Bramley
- Location within Gauteng Location within South Africa
- Coordinates: 26°07′27″S 28°04′54″E
- Country: South Africa
- Province: Gauteng
- Municipality: City of Johannesburg
- Main Place: Johannesburg
- Established: 1904

Area
  - Total: 1.41 km^{2} (0.54 sq mi)

Population (2011)
  - Total: 1,770
  - Density: 1,260/km^{2} (3,250/sq mi)

Racial makeup (2011)
  - Black African: 67.6%
  - Coloured: 3.6%
  - Indian: 8.1%
  - White: 20.3%
  - Other: 0.3%

First languages (2011)
  - English: 40.0%
  - Zulu: 16.9%
  - Tswana: 8.4%
  - Afrikaans: 6.0%
  - Other: 28.8%
- Time zone: UTC+2 (SAST)
- Postal code (street): 2090
- PO box: 2018

Bramley is a suburb of Johannesburg, South Africa. It is located in Region E of the City of Johannesburg Metropolitan Municipality.

== History ==
The suburb is situated on part of an old Witwatersrand farm called Syferfontein. It was established in 1904 and was named after one of the landowners, Edward Bramley.
