= M9 (Johannesburg) =

Road in South Africa

Metropolitan route M9

Route information
- Maintained by Johannesburg Roads Agency and Gauteng Department of Roads and Transport
- Length: 29 km (18 mi)

Major junctions
- South end: M34 Turf Club Street, Turffontein

- M2 Eloff Street Interchange; R29 Anderson Street, Marshalltown; R24 Commissioner Street, Johannesburg; M10 Smit Street, Braamfontein; M18 Jorissen Street, Braamfontein; M71 Empire Road, Parktown; M1 Oxford Road North Interchange; M16 Eastwold Way, Riviera; R25 11th Avenue, Riviera; M20 Glenhove Road, Melrose; M30 Corlett Drive, Illovo M75 / M85 Sandton Drive, Sandhurst M64 West Street, Sandown; M40 Grayston Drive, Sandown M74 South Road, Morningside; N1 (Western Bypass), Woodmead; R564 Witkoppen Road, Sunninghill
- North end: R55 Woodmead Drive, Barbeque Downs

Location
- Country: South Africa

Highway system
- Numbered routes of South Africa
← M8	→ M10

The M9 is a major metropolitan route in the City of Johannesburg, South Africa. Passing through the heart of the Witwatersrand, it connects the southern suburbs of Johannesburg via the centre of Johannesburg, with the northern suburbs and business centres of Rosebank and Sandton before ending in the outer northern suburbs.

== Route ==
The M9 begins at a T-junction with the M34 (Turf Club Street) in Turffontein. From this junction, it heads north as Turffontein Road passing the Turffontein Racecourse on its right. After passing Wembley Stadium, the road becomes Eloff Street, passing over a railway track into Village Deep. The M9 interchanges with the M2 freeway, passing under it to enter the Johannesburg CBD. In Marshalltown, it reaches an intersection with the R29 (Anderson Street; Marshall Street), where it joins the R29 westwards before turning north to become Rissik Street (one-way street). As Rissik Street, it proceeds to cross the R24 (Commissioner Street and Albertina Sisulu Road), where it passes the old Johannesburg City Hall. Continuing north through the CBD, it crosses over the John Rissik Bridge and the railway lines of the Johannesburg Park Station, the city's main railway station, and into Braamfontein, where it meets the M10 (Wolmarans Street & Smit Street). Climbing the ridge, the road splits left, becoming Loveday Street, passing the Joburg Theatre on its left and the Civic Buildings to the right. At the top of the ridge, it turns right onto Hoofd Street and then left onto Joubert Street, passing the Old Fort and the Constitutional Court of South Africa on Constitutional Hill. The road now descends the hill heading north towards Parktown, passing the old Transvaal Memorial Hospital for Children and the old maternity hospital, intersecting and crossing the M71 Empire Road.

Now called Victoria Avenue, the M9 passes Pieter Roos Park, crossing St Andrews Road and then passes the Wits Business School, the University of the Witwatersrand's Education Campus and the Nelson Mandela Children's Hospital. At the intersection with Oxford Road, the M9 turns right to become Oxford Road and is briefly parallel with the M1 North freeway before crossing under it, heading north-east. It meets the M16 (Eastwold Way) and turns north in Killarney before it is intersected by the R25 (Cotswald Drive; 11th Avenue) in Riviera. Crossing the M20 (Bolton Road; Glenhove Road), it passes in-between the commercial area of Rosebank to the left and the suburb of Melrose to the right. As it passes Jellicoe Avenue, the M9 turns north-east and passes by Dunkeld and Melrose. Shortly after passing the M30 Corlett Drive, the route turns north-west as Rivonia Road and heads through Hyde Park and Illovo. In Sandhurst, the road turns north-east again and crosses the M75 Sandton Drive and M85 Katherine Street into the Sandton central business district. It then meets the M64 West Street.

Turning north-west in the Sandton CBD, it leaves the area, crossing the M40 Grayston Drive into Benmore Gardens and Sandown before turning north-east into Morningside. Crossing Kelvin Drive into Rivonia, the M9 Rivonia Road now kinks north-west, then north, as it passes through Edenburg, the suburbs main commercial area. The M9 proceeds to intersect and cross under the N1 highway (Western Bypass) at the Rivonia Road Interchange before meeting the R564 Witkoppen Road and continuing north into Paulshof and Sunninghill. After a short distance it becomes Leeukop Road and at the entrance to Leeukop Prison, the road turns north-east as Malindi Road and after 2.4 km in Barbeque Downs the road ends at a T-junction with the R55 Woodmead Drive.
