= M64 (Johannesburg) =

Metropolitan route in the City of Johannesburg, South Africa

Metropolitan route M64

Route information
- Maintained by Johannesburg Roads Agency and Gauteng Department of Roads and Transport
- Length: 13.7 km (8.5 mi)

Major junctions
- South end: M85 in Sandown

- M9 in Sandown; M40 in Sandown; M81 in Bryanston; M71 in Bryanston M74 / M75 in Bryanston
- North end: R564 in Douglasdale

Location
- Country: South Africa

Highway system
- Numbered routes of South Africa
← M63	→ M67

The M64 is a short metropolitan route in the City of Johannesburg, South Africa. It is in the city of Sandton, connecting Sandown with Douglasdale via Bryanston.

== Route ==
The M64 starts at a junction with the M85 route (Katherine Street) in Sandton Central (Sandown). It heads northwards as West Street to meet the M9 route (Rivonia Road) at the next junction adjacent to the Gautrain Station. It continues northwards through the Sandton CBD to reach a junction with the M40 route (Grayston Drive).

From the M40 junction, the M64 continues north to enter the western limits of the suburb of Morningside as Benmore Road, passing through Benmore Gardens and Northern Acres. It then turns east to become Outspan Road before turning north to become Ballyclare Drive. As Ballyclare Drive, it bends to the west, passing through River Club (where it crosses the Braamfontein Spruit), to enter the suburb of Bryanston. It turns north as St Audley Road before turning north-west as Grosvenor Road to reach a junction with the M81 route (Winnie Mandela Drive).

Still named Grosvenor Road, it continues west to meet the M71 route (Main Road) at the next junction and pass through the western part of Bryanston, where it meets the M75 route (Bryanston Drive) before turning northwards to fly over the N1 highway (Western Bypass). It enters the suburb of Douglasdale and becomes Douglas Drive. It continues northwards to reach its end at a junction with the R564 route (Witkoppen Road).
