= M81 (Johannesburg) =

Metropolitan route in the City of Johannesburg, South Africa

Metropolitan route M81

Route information
- Maintained by Johannesburg Roads Agency and Gauteng Department of Roads and Transport
- Length: 10.1 km (6.3 mi)

Major junctions
- South end: M27 in Craighall Park
- M75 in Parkmore; M13 in Hurlingham M64 in Bryanston; M71 in Bryanston M74 in Bryanston
- North end: N1 / R511 in Bryanston

Location
- Country: South Africa

Highway system
- Numbered routes of South Africa
← M80	→ M82

The M81 is a short metropolitan route in Greater Johannesburg, South Africa. It connects Craighall Park with Bryanston. For its entire route, it is named Winnie Mandela Drive (formerly William Nicol Drive; renamed on 26 September 2023).

== Route ==
The M81 begins as Winnie Mandela Drive (formerly William Nicol Drive) just north of Craighall Park at the intersection with Jan Smuts Avenue (M27) (by the Hyde Park Corner Shopping Mall). It heads north, passing through the suburbs of Hyde Park, Sandhurst and Hurlingham. In Parkmore, the M75 Sandton Drive intercepts the route as a T-junction, the main route to Sandton City. Turning north-west, the route crosses the Braamfontein Spruit in Hurlingham Manor and is intersected at a T-junction with the westbound Republic Road (M13), the main road to Randburg. It turns north and passes through Sandton and into Bryanston. Here it crosses the road junctions of Main Road (M71) and Grosvenor Road (M64). It continues north-westwards crossing Bryanston Drive (M74) and shortly reaches the N1 highway (Western Bypass) junction no. 95. Here, the M81 ends but Winnie Mandela Drive continues north-north-west as the R511.
