= M74 (Johannesburg) =

Metropolitan route in the City of Johannesburg, South Africa

Metropolitan route M74

Route information
- Maintained by Johannesburg Roads Agency and Gauteng Department of Roads and Transport
- Length: 14.5 km (9.0 mi)

Major junctions
- West end: M64 Grosvenor Road
- M81 Winnie Mandela Drive; M71 Main Road; M9 Rivonia Road
- East end: M60 Marlboro Drive

Location
- Country: South Africa

Highway system
- Numbered routes of South Africa
← M72	→ M75

The M74 is a short metropolitan route in Sandton, South Africa. It connects the suburb of Bryanston with Rivonia, Morningside and Marlboro.

== Route ==
The M74 begins at a junction with Grosvenor Road (M64). It heads north-east as Bryanston Drive until it reaches Winnie Mandela Drive (M81). Here the route turns east and after a short distance crosses Main Road (M71) continuing eastward as Bryanston Drive before turning south-east. It crosses the Braamfontein Spruit still as Bryanston Drive and into Morningside and eventually reaches Rivonia Drive (M9). Co-signed with the M9 it heads south on Rivonia Road before leaving the latter, close to the Morningside Clinic, heading eastwards as South Road past Stathavon crossing Bowling Avenue (M85) into Kramerville. It continues under the M1 motorway before shortly ending as a T-junction with the Marlboro Drive (M60).
