= M85 (Johannesburg) =

Metropolitan route in the City of Johannesburg, South Africa

Metropolitan route M85

Route information
- Maintained by Johannesburg Roads Agency and Gauteng Department of Roads and Transport
- Length: 10.3 km (6.4 mi)

Major junctions
- South end: M9 in Sandhurst
- M40 in Sandown; M60 in Kramerville M74 in Wendywood
- North end: R564 in Sunninghill

Location
- Country: South Africa

Highway system
- Numbered routes of South Africa
← M84	→ M86

The M85 is a short metropolitan route in Sandton, South Africa that connects Sandton Central with Sunninghill via Gallo Manor.

== Route ==
The M85 begins at a junction with the M9 route (Rivonia Road) and the M75 route (Sandton Drive) in Sandton Central, just east of Sandhurst. It heads east-north-east through Sandown to reach an interchange with the M40 route (Grayston Drive). It continues north-east to leave Sandown and reach the suburb of Kramerville, where it meets the western terminus of the M60 route (Marlboro Drive) before meeting the M74 route (South Road).

It continues northwards as Bowling Avenue, through Wendywood (east of Morningside) and Gallo Manor, passing in-between Woodmead & Rivonia (bypassing the Sandton Country Club), to pass under the N1 highway (Western Bypass) and reach its end at a junction with the R564 route (Witkoppen Road) in Sunninghill.
