= M40 (Johannesburg) =

Metropolitan route in the City of Johannesburg, South Africa

Metropolitan route M40

Route information
- Maintained by Johannesburg Roads Agency and Gauteng Department of Roads and Transport
- Length: 17.3 km (10.7 mi)

Major junctions
- North-west end: M75 in Sandhurst

- M64 in Sandown; M9 in Sandown M85 in Sandown; M1 in Sandown; M11 in Wynberg M54 in Wynberg; M30 in Kew; M20 in Lyndhurst; R25 in Sunningdale; M16 near Linksfield M97 in Bedfordview M98 in Bedfordview

- South-east end: M52 / N3 / N12 in Bedfordview

Location
- Country: South Africa

Highway system
- Numbered routes of South Africa
← M39	→ M41

The M40 is a metropolitan route in Greater Johannesburg, South Africa that connects Sandton with Bedfordview via Wynberg, Kew, Lyndhurst and Senderwood.

== Route ==
The M40 begins at a junction with the M75 route (Sandton Drive) in Sandhurst, just west of the Sandton city centre (Sandown). It heads north-east, then east, as Grayston Drive to reach a junction with the M9 route (Rivonia Road). It continues eastwards as Grayston Drive through Sandown to meet the M85 route (Katherine Street) before crossing the M1 freeway (De Villiers Graaff Motorway) and entering the industrial area of Wynberg, where it turns to the south-east and becomes one-way streets (Andries Street north-westwards to the M1 & 6th Street south-eastwards from the M1) for a few metres before becoming Arkwright Avenue eastwards and proceeding to meet the M11 route (Pretoria Main Road).

At the second junction afterwards, as Arkwright Avenue becomes the M54 route, the M40 becomes 2nd Avenue south-eastwards to pass through the suburb of Kew. It meets the M30 route (9th Avenue) before reaching a junction with the M20 route (Johannesburg Road; Pretoria Road) in Lyndhurst. The M40 joins the M20 north-eastwards up to the next junction, where the M40 becomes Kernick Road south-eastwards. It then becomes Dartford Avenue, then Daleview Road, to reach a junction with Northfield Avenue in Sunningdale Ridge, where it becomes Northfield Avenue, then Avon Road, south-eastwards to reach a junction with the R25 route (George Avenue; Modderfontein Road).

The M40 continues south-eastwards from the R25 junction as Club Street to reach a junction with the M16 route (Linksfield Road) north-east of Linksfield and west of Edenvale. It continues southwards as Civin Drive to pass through Senderwood before crossing the Jukskei River and bypassing the Gillooly's Farm as Boeing Road West. It enters the town of Bedfordview in the City of Ekurhuleni, where it turns southwards in the suburb of Morninghill to fly over the R24 route (Albertina Sisulu Road) and become Van Der Linde Road. It passes southwards through the suburb of Oriel, meeting the M97 route (Nicol Road) and the M98 route (Smith Road; Kloof Road) before reaching its end at a junction with the M52 route (Van Buuren Road) in Bedford Gardens, adjacent to the M52's interchange with the N3/N12 highway (Johannesburg Eastern Bypass).
