= Jan Smuts Avenue =

Road in Johannesburg, South Africa

Coordinates: 26.145538°S 28.035908°E

Metropolitan route M27

Route information
- Maintained by Johannesburg Roads Agency and Department of Roads and Transport (Gauteng)
- Length: 7.75 mi (12.47 km)
- Existed: 1890s–present

Major junctions
- South end: Bertha Street, Braamfontein
- M1 Junction 14 Jan Smuts Ave/M27, Parktown; M16 Upper Park Drive, Forrest Town; Westcliff Drive, Westcliff, Gauteng; R25 Cotswold Drive, Saxonwold; M20 Chester Road, Parkwood; Bolton Road, Parkwood; M30 7th Avenue, Parktown North; Jellico Avenue, Rosebank; M81 Winnie Mandela Drive, Hyde Park; M13 Republic Road, Randburg; M71 Bram Fischer Drive, Randburg
- North end: Bram Fischer Drive, Randburg

Location
- Country: South Africa

Highway system
- Numbered routes of South Africa

Jan Smuts Avenue is a major street in Johannesburg, South Africa. It begins in Randburg, and passes through important business areas like Rosebank. It passes the Johannesburg Zoo, Zoo Lake and Wits University before becoming Bertha Street, and the Nelson Mandela Bridge near the Johannesburg CBD. It has been described as "the most important road for a tourist" in Johannesburg. It forms part of Johannesburg's M27 route.

== Route ==
This major northbound Johannesburg road is roughly 12 km long and is mostly a two or three lane dual carriageway. Jan Smuts Avenue begins in Braamfontein's ridge as an extension northwards of Bertha Street around Stiemens Street. It passes the East campus of the University of Witwatersrand on its left and Helpmekaar College on the right before descending into the leafy suburb of Parktown where it crosses over a major intersection with the M71 Empire Road. After crossing Empire Road, passes over the M1 De Villiers Graaff motorway with several entrances and exits at this intersection. Leaving Parktown, the road begins to drop as it descends Parktown Ridge through the hilly and leafy suburbs of Westcliff and Forest Town. As it enters Parkview, it passes through the Herman Eckstein Park, with the Johannesburg Zoo to the right and Zoo Lake to the left.

Narrowing to single lanes in Saxonwold, Jan Smuts Avenue splits northwards at the Cotswold Drive (R25) winding its way out off Saxonwold and into Parkwood. It resumes as a dual carriageway as it climbs into the retail suburb of Rosebank and leafy Parktown North before dropping down into Dunkeld West as a single carriageway. A short while later it resumes as a dual carriageway passes into Hyde Park where at a major intersection close to the Hyde Park Corner shopping centre, the road splits north-west when it intersects the start of the Winnie Mandela Drive (M81). It passes through Craighall and Craighall Park, crossing the Braamfontein Spruit. It then enters the old Randburg suburbs of Blairgowrie and Bordeaux intersecting Bram Fischer Drive in Ferndale where Jan Smuts Avenue ends.

== History ==
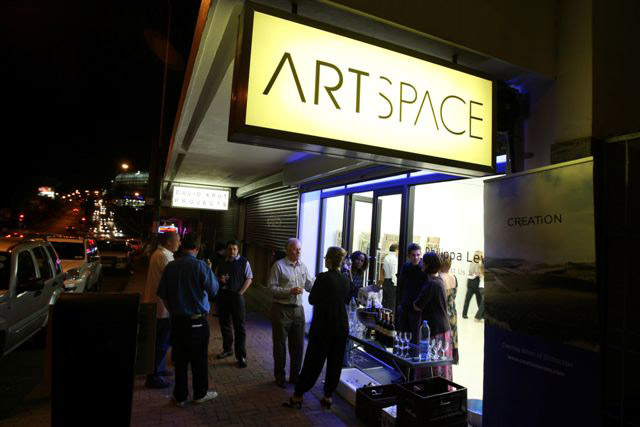
Jan Smuts Avenue

Jan Smuts Avenue is named after the Second Boer War general and Prime Minister of the Union of South Africa Jan Smuts. On 3 July 1917, the Federation of Ratepayers Association recommended to the City of Johannesburg that two main roads in Johannesburg be named after Louis Botha and Jan Smuts, in honour of their service to the British Empire during World War I. Prior to the road's renaming in 1917, it was known as the Pretoria Road.
