= Bryanston East, Gauteng =

Bryanston East
- Location within Greater Johannesburg Location within Gauteng Location within South Africa
- Coordinates: 26°2′20″S 28°1′3″E
- Country: South Africa
- Province: Gauteng
- Municipality: City of Johannesburg

Area
  - Total: 0.83 km^{2} (0.32 sq mi)

Population (2001)
  - Total: 478
  - Density: 580/km^{2} (1,500/sq mi)
- Time zone: UTC+2 (SAST)
- Postal code (street): 2191
- PO box: 2152

Bryanston East is a wealthy, upper class suburb of Johannesburg, South Africa. It is one of the wealthiest suburbs in South Africa. It borders the suburbs of Rivonia, Riverclub, Morningside Manor and Sandton. It is located in Region E of the City of Johannesburg Metropolitan Municipality.
