= M60 (Johannesburg) =

Metropolitan route in the City of Johannesburg, South Africa

Metropolitan route M60

Route information
- Maintained by Johannesburg Roads Agency and Gauteng Department of Roads and Transport
- Length: 5.2 km (3.2 mi)

Major junctions
- East end: N3 near Modderfontein
- M74 in Marlboro Gardens; M11 in Marlboro Gardens; M1 in Kramerville

- West end: M85 in Sandown

Location
- Country: South Africa

Highway system
- Numbered routes of South Africa
← M59	→ M61

The M60 is a short metropolitan route in the City of Johannesburg, South Africa. It connects Sandton with the Linbro Business Park adjacent to Modderfontein.

== Route ==
The M60 begins at the northern entrance to Linbro Park (west of Modderfontein; south of Frankenwald), heading westwards. It crosses the N3 highway (Johannesburg Eastern Bypass) into Sandton and separates the Kelvin suburb in the north from Marlboro Gardens in the south. It crosses the M1 freeway (De Villiers Graaff Motorway) and ends immediately thereafter at a t-junction with the M85 road in the suburb of Kramerville.
