= M16 (Johannesburg) =

Road in Johannesburg, South Africa

Metropolitan route M16

Route information
- Maintained by Johannesburg Roads Agency and Gauteng Department of Roads and Transport
- Length: 25.1 km (15.6 mi)

Major junctions
- West end: M71 Barry Hertzog Avenue, Greenside
- M27 Jan Smuts Ave, Westcliff; M9 Oxford Road, Saxonwold; M1 Riviera Road, Killarney; M31 West Street, Houghton Estate; M11 Louis Botha Avenue, Orange Grove; M40 Civin Drive, Senderwood; N3 Linksfield Road Interchange, Dowerglen M97 1st Avenue, Edenvale M37 17th Avenue, Edenvale M78 Harris Avenue, Edenglen M59 Barbara Road, Croydon M39 Isando Road, Croydon

- East end: M57 Pretoria Road, Kempton Park

Location
- Country: South Africa

Highway system
- Numbered routes of South Africa
| ← M14 | → M17 |

M16 is a metropolitan route in the Greater Johannesburg metropolitan area, South Africa. It begins in the north-western suburb of Greenside and heads eastwards through some of Johannesburg's northern suburbs and through Edenvale to end at the East Rand town of Kempton Park.

== Route ==
Starting at an intersection with the M71 (Barry Hertzog Avenue) in Greenside, the route heads east as Greenhill Road to Parkview Golf Club. It then crosses the golf course and the Braamfontein Spruit as Wicklow Avenue. Crossing Emmarentia Avenue, it continues south-east until it reaches a t-junction with Westcliff Drive and continues eastwards as the latter, circling the Westcliff suburb and reaching the M27 road (Jan Smuts Avenue). The M16 route turns south onto Jan Smuts Avenue and is cosigned briefly before turning east onto Upper Park Drive in Forest Town, where it follows the southern border of the Johannesburg Zoo and then becomes Erlsworld Way in Saxonwold. Outside the South African National Museum of Military History, it turns right onto Eastwold Way. It continues eastwards, crossing over the M9 (Oxford Road) and becomes Riviera Road in Killarney before reaching the M1 North motorway interchange.

Crossing the M1 motorway, it reaches a t-junction with the M31 West Street in Houghton Estate, where it turns south and is cosigned briefly before turning left and heading east as 1st Avenue in Houghton, passing close to Houghton Golf Course before intersecting the M11 (Louis Botha Avenue). Turning left, now cosigned with the M11 Louis Botha Avenue it heads northwards into Orange Grove. Passing 8th Street (M16 one-way west), the route leaves Louis Botha Avenue, turning east into 10th Street (one-way east) before turning right onto 9th Avenue and left onto Club Street where it continues eastwards close to Royal Johannesburg & Kensington Golf Club and then turns northwards past Huddle Park in Linksfield.

There, it reaches the intersection with Civin Drive, crosses over it and turns eastwards as Linksfield Road to cross the N3 freeway (Eastern Bypass) at the Linksfield Road Interchange. Continuing east through Dowerglen, it enters Edenvale, crossing the M97 1st Avenue and becomes 2nd Street (one-way east), passing through the CBD while Horwood Street to the south is the one-way M16 West, meeting the M37 at 17th avenue. Leaving the CBD, it crosses 11th Avenue and becomes Homestead Road, crossing JP Bezuidenhout Park to the north and the cemetery to the south before crossing Paliser Road. It becomes Baker Road in Edenglen, where it eventually reaches a junction with the M78 (Harris Avenue). Turn right onto Harris Avenue, it heads south, briefly cosigned with the M78 before Harris Avenue breaks off to the left continuing eastwards, passing Harmelia and reaches a t-junction with Sandvale Road, where the route turns left.

Continuing northwards, it reaches the intersection of Driefontein and Barbara Road (M59) in Isandovale. The route crosses over it to enter Kempton Park, continuing north-east through Croydon and reaching the intersection with Isando Road (M39). Crossing over it, it continues as a north-easterly route, following the R24 freeway to its right, through the industrial suburb of Spartan. The route then ends as a t-junction with the M57 road (Pretoria Road) just south of Rhodesfield.
