= M27 (Johannesburg) =

Road in Johannesburg, South Africa

Metropolitan route M27

Route information
- Maintained by Johannesburg Roads Agency and Gauteng Department of Roads and Transport
- Length: 18.3 km (11.4 mi)
- Existed: 1890s–present

Major junctions
- South end: M1 Booysens Road Interchange, Booysens
- M7 Kliprivier Drive, Booysens; M2 Village Road/Selby Interchange; R29 Anderson St/Marshal St, Marshalltown; R24 Albertina Sisulu Rd/Commissioner Str, Johannesburg CBD; M10 Smit Street, Braamfontein; M18 De Korte St/Jorissen St, Braamfontein; M1 Junction 14 Jan Smuts Ave/M27, Parktown; M16 Upper Park Drive, Forrest Town; Westcliff Drive, Westcliff; R25 Cotswold Drive, Saxonwold; M20 Chester Road, Parkwood; Bolton Road, Parkwood; M30 7th Avenue, Parktown North; Jellico Avenue, Rosebank; M81 Winnie Mandela Drive, Hyde Park; M13 Republic Road, Randburg
- North end: M71 Bram Fischer Drive, Randburg

Location
- Country: South Africa

Highway system
- Numbered routes of South Africa
← M22	→ M30

M27 is a major road in the City of Johannesburg, South Africa. A large part of the route is named Jan Smuts Avenue which is roughly 12 km long. It begins in the southern suburb of Booysens and heads northwards through the Johannesburg CBD and the northern suburbs of Randburg.

== Route ==
The M27 begins at the M1 Booysens Street Interchange as a number of off-ramps and heads northwards as Booysens Street through Booysens, Ophirton and into Selby. In Selby, the M27 crosses under the M2 motorway at the Village Road/Selby Interchange into the Johannesburg CBD. Here the route becomes one-way as Pixley Seme Street heading north through the city with Newtown to the west. The M27 as a southbound one-way road through the CBD is called Simmonds Street, starting at the Queen Elizabeth Bridge and runs through under the M2 where it joins Booysens Street. Leaving the CBD the road resumes being dual carriageway as it crosses the railway lines via the Queen Elizabeth Bridge as Queen Elizabeth Drive and into Braamfontein. Turning right, its joined by traffic crossing the Nelson Mandela Bridge and its heads north through to the top of Braamfontein ridge as Bertha Street.

The M27, now called Jan Smuts Avenue begins on Braamfontein's ridge as an extension northwards of Bertha Street at the intersection with Stiemens Street. It passes the East campus of the University of Witwatersrand on its left and Helpmekaar Kollege on the right before descending into the leafy suburb of Parktown where it crosses over a major intersection with the M71 Empire Road. After crossing Empire Road, passes over the M1 De Villiers Graaff motorway again with several entrances and exits at this intersection. Leaving Parktown, the road begins to drop as it descends Parktown Ridge through the hilly and leafy suburbs of Westcliff and Forest Town. As it enters Parkview, it passes through the Herman Eckstein Park, with the Johannesburg Zoo to the right and Zoo Lake to the left.

Narrowing to single lanes in Saxonwold, Jan Smuts Avenue splits northwards at the Cotswold Drive (R25) winding its way out of Saxonwold and into Parkwood. It resumes as a dual carriageway as it climbs into the retail suburb of Rosebank and leafy Parktown North before dropping down into Dunkeld West as a single carriageway. A short while later it resumes as a dual carriageway and passes through Hyde Park where at a major intersection close to the Hyde Park Corner shopping centre, the road splits north-west when it intersects the start of the M81 Winnie Mandela Drive. It passes through Craighall and Craighall Park, crossing the Braamfontein Spruit. It then enters the old Randburg suburbs of Blairgowrie and Bordeaux intersecting Bram Fischer Drive in Ferndale where the M27 Jan Smuts Avenue ends.
