= M54 (Johannesburg) =

Metropolitan route in the City of Johannesburg, South Africa

Metropolitan route M54

Route information
- Maintained by Johannesburg Roads Agency and Gauteng Department of Roads and Transport
- Length: 6.8 km (4.2 mi)

Major junctions
- West end: M40 in Wynberg
- N3 near Linbro Park
- East end: R25 near Modderfontein

Location
- Country: South Africa

Highway system
- Numbered routes of South Africa
← M53	→ M56

The M54 is a short metropolitan route in the City of Johannesburg, South Africa that connects Wynberg with Modderfontein via Alexandra.

== Route ==
The M54 begins at a junction with the M40 route (Arkwright Avenue; 2nd Street) in Wynberg. It heads eastwards as Arkwright Avenue, then as Wynberg Road, to form the southern boundary of the Alexandra township (separating it from Kew). It then becomes Vincent Tshabalala Road (previously London Road), crossing the Jukskei River and passing through the East Bank to reach an intersection with the N3 highway (Johannesburg Eastern Bypass) south-west of Linbro Park. From the N3 interchange, it heads east-south-east as Peace Street, separating Linbro Park in the north from Longmeadow Business Estate in the south, to reach its end at a junction with the R25 route (Modderfontein Road) just south of Lakeside (Modderfontein) and north of Greenstone Hill.
