= R511 (South Africa) =

Road in South Africa

Regional route R511

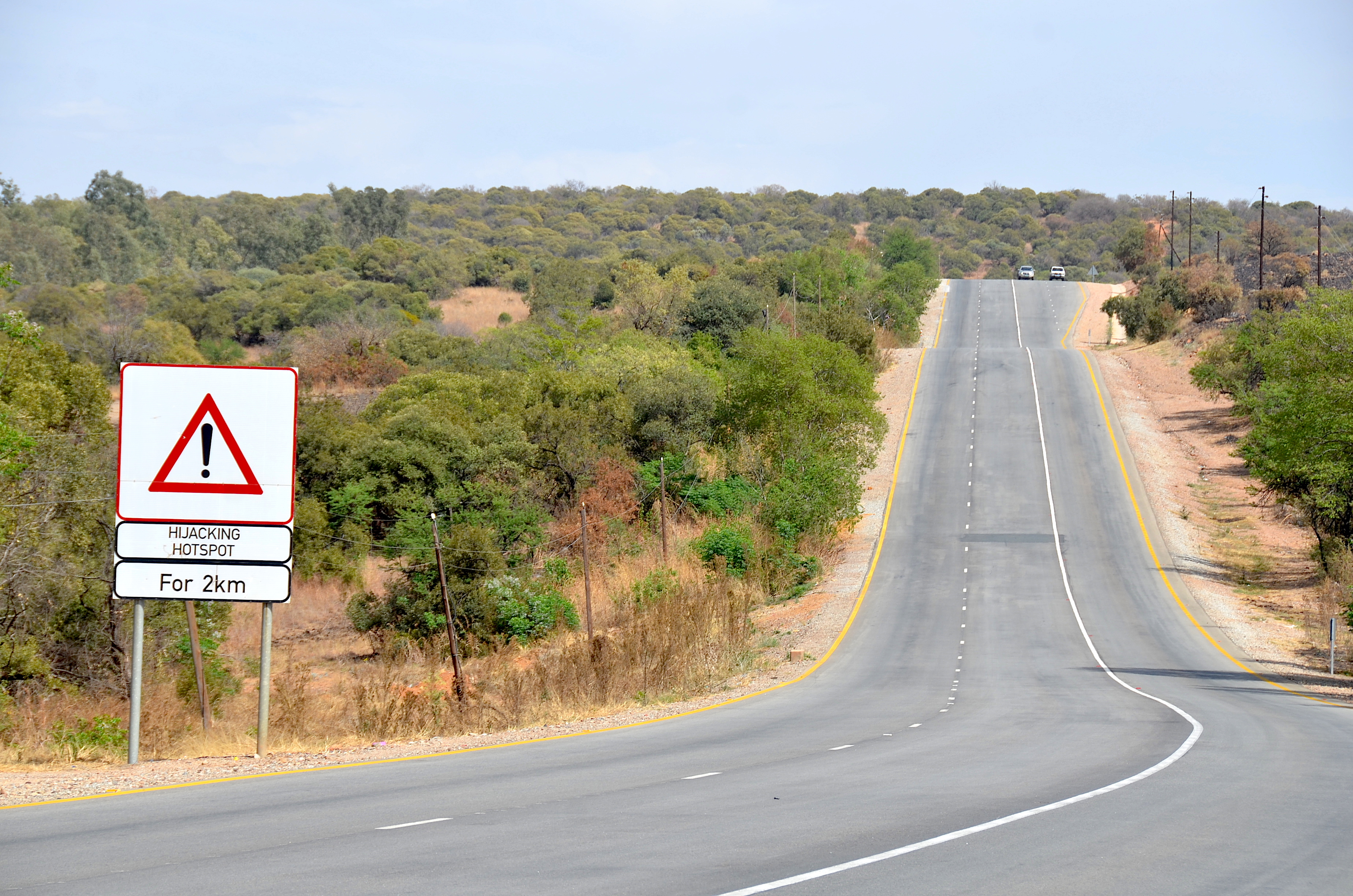

Route information
- Maintained by SANRAL and GDRT
- Length: 192 km (119 mi)

Major junctions
- South end: M71 / M81 in Bryanston
- N1 (Western Bypass) in Bryanston; R564 in Fourways; N14 / R562 / R114 in Diepsloot; R104 in Hartbeespoort; R514 near Hartbeespoort; R513 near Hartbeespoort; N4 near Brits; R566 near Brits; R512 in Brits; R516
- North end: R510 near Thabazimbi

Location
- Country: South Africa
- Major cities: South of Thabazimbi (R510 junction); Brits; Hartbeespoort; Sandton

Highway system
- Numbered routes of South Africa
← R510	→ R512

The R511 is a Regional Route in South Africa that connects Sandton (north of Johannesburg) with Thabazimbi via Hartbeespoort and Brits.

It is an alternative route to the R512 for travel between the Johannesburg Metropole and Brits.

== Route ==
=== Gauteng ===
It begins as Winnie Mandela Drive (formerly William Nicol Drive; renamed on 26 September 2023) at its interchange with the N1 highway (Johannesburg Western Bypass) in Fourways, a suburb of Sandton, Johannesburg Metropole, Gauteng. South of the N1, the road is designated the M81.

Heading north out of the city, it passes Montecasino, before crossing the R564 (Witkoppen Road). North of Witkoppen Road, it passes through the affluent Lonehill and Dainfern suburbs (where it crosses the Jukskei River) to reach the township of Diepsloot. Just after Diepsloot, it meets the western end of the R562 from Midrand and forms an interchange with the N14 highway.

On the other side of the N14 interchange, it enters the City of Tshwane Metropolitan Municipality and intersects with the R114 at a staggered junction (co-signed for 1.6 kilometres). The road then reaches a t-junction, where the north–south road becomes Pretoria's M26 metropolitan route, and the R511 becomes the road to the north-west towards Hartbeespoort via a left turn. The R511 crosses the Hennops River (becoming a short mountain pass) and proceeds to meet the R104 road (WF Nkomo Street; Elias Motsoaledi Street) before flying over Pretoria's M4 freeway (Magalies Toll Freeway) near Flora Park. The R104 joins the R511 and they become cosigned in a north-westerly direction.

=== North West and Limpopo ===
After passing over the M4 freeway, the route crosses into the North West and enters the Hartbeespoort suburb of Flora Park in a north-westerly direction. In the Melodie area of Hartbeespoort, the R104 remains on the same road westwards (Tielman Street) towards the Hartbeespoort Dam Wall while the R511 becomes Beethoven Road northwards. After 3 kilometres, the R511 meets the western terminus of the R514 from Pretoria at a t-junction and the R511 becomes the road towards the north-west from this junction. After 3 kilometres, it meets the western terminus of the R513 road, which is coming from Pretoria North. The R511 then meets a road which goes south-west to the western side of the Hartbeespoort Dam.

The R511 then forms an interchange with the N4 highway (Platinum Highway). It then crosses the R566 road and passes north-westwards through the town of Brits as Hendrik Verwoerd Drive, where it meets the northern terminus of the R512 (Van Velden Street) in the town centre.

From Brits, the R511 continues heading north-north-west, passing through Beestekraal before crossing into Limpopo. It then meets the western terminus of the R516. It ends just south of Thabazimbi at a junction with the R510. From Hartbeespoort to the R510 junction, it follows the Crocodile River.
