= Metropolitan routes in Johannesburg =

System of numbered roads in Greater Johannesburg, South Africa

Johannesburg metropolitan 1 route marker

Johannesburg metropolitan 93 route marker

Metropolitan Routes in Johannesburg, also called Metro Roads or Metro Routes are designated with the letter M, and are usually major routes around Johannesburg and some areas declared part of Greater Johannesburg (including the town of Krugersdorp and the Ekurhuleni Metropolitan Municipality).

== Table of M roads ==
No.	Direction	Description of Route	Suburbs	Cities	Street Names	Notes
M1	North/South	N12/R82 (Ridgeway) - M5/R553 - M17 - M27 - M2 (cosigned east/west) - M10 - M18 - M17 - M27 - M9 - M31 - M16 - R25 - M20 - M30 - M40 - M60 - R55 - N1/N3 (Buccleuch)	Ridgeway/Ormonde, Crown Gardens/Evans Park, Robertsham, Booysens, Crown Mines, Newtown, Braamfontein, Parktown, Killarney, Houghton Estate, Waverley, Bramley, Wynberg, Wendywood, Kelvin, Buccleuch	Johannesburg, Sandton	De Villiers Graaff Motorway	Highway
M2	East/West	R41 (Crown Mines) - M1 (cosigned) - M9 - M31 - M19 - M33 - N3/N12 - M93 - M53 - M37 (Germiston)	Crown Mines, Selby, Kaserne, Benrose, Denver, Driehoek, Germiston CBD	Johannesburg, Germiston	Francois Oberholzer Freeway, Jack St	Highway
M5	North/South	M38 (Ridgeway) - R553/M1 - M79 - M70 - R41 - R24 (cosigned east/west) - M10 (cosigned 1 block east/west) - M18 - M16 - M30 - M8 - N1 - M86 - M6 - R564 - M67 - R114 (cosigned east/west) - N14 (Muldersdrift)	Ridgeway, Ormonde/Aeroton, Nasrec, Riverlea, Paarlshoop, Crosby/Mayfair West, Brixton, Rossmore, Auckland Park, Melville, Montgomery Park, Franklin Roosevelt Park, Northcliff/Risidale, Blackheath, Kelland, Randpark Ridge, Sundowner, Laser Park, Zandspruit, Rural areas	Johannesburg, Randburg	Nasrec Rd, Marais St, Schoeman St, Du Toit St, Deville St (R24), Jerome Ave, Mercury St, High St (M10), Ripley Rd, Ditton Ave, University Rd, Main Rd, Beyers Naude Dr	
M6	East/West	R564 (Glen Dayson) - M69 - M5 - R512 - M71 (Ferndale)	Glen Dayson, Randpark Ridge, Boskruin, Bromhof, Malanshof, Ferndale	Roodepoort, Randburg	John Vorster Dr, Ysterhout Dr, Hans Schoeman St, Hill St, Main Ave, Bond St	
M7	North/South	Hill Rd (unsigned), M53, M61(cosigned), M80, R59, R554, M68, M19 (cosigned), M68, N12, M38, M34, M27, M70, R41, R24, M10 (cosigned east/west), M18 (cosigned), M17 (Richmond)	Zonkizizwe, Tsietsie, Siluma View, Palm Ridge, Edenpark, Phola Park, Tokoza, Alrode South, Albertsdal, Brackendowns, Liefde en Vrede, Aspen Lakes, Mulbarton, Suideroord, Gillview, Bellavista South, Bellavista Estate, West Turffontein, Booysens, Orphirton, Selby, Mayfair, Fordsburg, Braamfontein, Cottesloe, Richmond	Katlehong, Alberton, Johannesburg	M7, Provincial Rd, Rivett-Carnett St, Vereeniging Rd (M61), Kliprivier Dr, Heronmere Rd, Long St, Earp St, Cross St, Treu Rd, Park Dr, 6th Ave, Mint Rd, De La Rey St, 17th St (M10), Solomon St, Annett Rd, Barry Hertzog Ave	
M8	East/West	M18 (Floracliffe) - M47 - N1 - M5 - M13 / M20 - R512 - M71	Floracliffe, Fairland, Northcliffe, Blackheath, Cresta, Darrenwood, Linden	Roodepoort, Randburg	William Nicol Dr, 14th Ave, Weltevreden Rd, Pendoring Rd, Judges Ave, South Rd/End Rd, 1st Ave	
M9	North/South	M34 (Turffontein) - M2 - R29 - R24 - M27 - M10 - M18 - M71 - M1 - M16 - R25 - M20 - M30 (cosigned) - M75 - M64 - M40 - M74 (cosigned) - N1 - R564 (Paulshof)	Turffontein, Stafford, Village Deep, Marshalltown, Johannesburg CBD, Braamfontein, Parktown, Houghton Estate, Melrose, Illovo, Inanda, Sandhurst, Sandton CBD, Morningside, Edenburg, Paulshof	Johannesburg, Sandton	Turffontein Rd, Eloff St, Rissik St, Loveday St/Joubert St, Victoria Ave, Oxford Rd, Rivonia Rd	
M10	East/West	R558 – R554 – N12 - M68 – M76 – M79 – M70 (cosigned), R41, R24, M18, M5 (cosigned), M17 (cosigned), M7 (cosigned), M1, M27, M9, M11, M31, M18 (Observatory)	Thembalihle, Lenasia, Klipspruit West, Klipriviersoog Estate, Pimville, Klipspruit, Orlando West, Orlando East, Noordgesig, Riverlea, Industria, Newclare, Westbury, Hurst Hill, Brixton, Mayfair, Braamfontein, Johannesburg CBD, Doornfontein, Bertrams, Bezuidenhout Valley, Observatory	Lenasia, Soweto, Johannesburg	Klipspruit Valley Rd, Main Rd, East Rd, Boundary Rd, Klipspruit Valley Rd, Soweto Highway (M70), Main Rd, Canada Rd, Commando Rd, Fuel Rd, Harmony St, Portland St, High St, Bartlett Rd, 17th St, Smit St, Smit St/Wolmarans St, Saratoga Ave, Charlton Ter, Berea Rd/Gordon Rd, North Ave/Bezuidenhout Ave, Homestead Ave	
M11	North/South	M95 (Bassonia) – N12 – M38 – M34 – N17 – M2 – R29 – R24 – M10 – M18 – M71 – M31 – M16 (cosigned) – R25 (cosigned) – M20 – M30 – M40 – M60 – R55/R101 (Kelvin)	Bassonia, Oakdene, Rosettenville, La Rochelle, Marshalltown, Johannesburg CBD, Joubert Park, Hillbrow, Houghton Estate, Orange Grove, Orchards, Highlands North, Savoy Estate, Bramley, Kew, Wynberg, Marlboro Gardens, Kelvin	Alberton, Johannesburg, Sandton	Comaro St, Oak Ave, Prairie St, Diagonal St, Wemmer Pan Rd, Mooi St, Anderson St /Marshall St (R29), Von Wielligh St, Klein St, King George St, Clarendon Pl, Louis Botha Ave, Pretoria Main Rd	
M13	North/South; East/West	M8 / M20 (Windsor East) – R512 – M71 – M27 – M81 (Hurlingham)	Windsor East, Windsor Glen, Randpark, Fontainebleau, Moret, Ferndale, Blairgowrie, Bordeaux, Hurlingham	Randburg, Johannesburg	Republic Rd	
M14	East/West	R29 (Jeppestown) – M33 – M52 – M53 – M37 (Primrose)	Jeppestown, Malvern East, Primrose Hill, Primrose	Johannesburg, Germiston	Jules St, Geldenhuis Rd, Cyclonia Rd, Gorst Ave, Churchill Ave	
M16	East/West	M5 (Emmerentia) – M71 (cosigned) – M27 (cosigned) – M9 – M31 (cosigned) – M11 (cosigned) – M33 – M40 – M97 – M37 – M78 – M59 – M39 – M57 (Isando)	Emmarentia, Parkview, Westcliff, Forest Town, Saxonwold, Houghton Estate, Orange Grove, Linksfield, Dowerglen, Dunvegan, Edenvale CBD, Edenglen, Isandovale, Croyden, Isando	Johannesburg, Edenvale, Kempton Park	Judith Rd, Barry Hertzog Ave (M71), Greenhill Rd, Wicklow Ave, Westcliff Dr, Jan Smuts Ave (M27), Upper Park Dr, Erlswold Way, Eastwold Way, Riviera Rd, West St (M31), 1st Ave, Louis Botha Ave (M11), 8th St, Club St, Linksfield Ave, 2nd St, Homestead Rd, Baker Rd, Harris Ave, Brabazon Rd, Andre Greyvenstein Rd	
M17	North/South	N12 (Winchester Hills) – M38 – M1 – M34 – M70 – R41 – R24 – M10 (cosigned) – M7/M71 (Parktown)	Winchester Hills, Robertsham, Ormonde, Theta, Mayfair, Brixton, Aukland Park, Parktown	Johannesburg	Xavier St, Crownwood Rd, Church St, Queens Rd, Smit St (M10), Brixton Rd, Symons Rd, Henley Rd, Kingsway Ave (M18), Empire Rd	
M18	East/West	R28 (Noordheuwel) – M36 – R558 – M67 (cosigned) – R564 – M69 – M8 – M47 – M30 – M10 – M5 – M17 – M7 (cosigned) – M27 – M9 (cosigned) – M11 – M31 (cosigned) – M10 – M33 – R24 (Bruma)	Noordheuwel, Factoria, Mindalore, Witpoortjie, Princess, Helderkruin, Horison Park, Horison, Ontdekkers Park, Constantia Kloof, Florida Park, Florida Hills, Florida North, Florida CBD, Maraisburg, Delarey, Newlands, Westbury, Westdene, Auckland Park, Cottesloe, Braamfontein, Hillbrow, Berea, Houghton Estate, Yeoville, Bellevue, Observatory, Dewetshof, Cyrildene, Bruma	Krugersdorp, Roodepoort, Johannesburg	Voortrekker Rd, Ontdekkers Rd, Main Rd, Perth Rd, Kingsway Ave, Annet Rd (M7), Solomon St (M7), Enoch Sontonga Ave, Jorissen Ave / De Korte St, Loveday St / Joubert St (M9), Kotze St, Kotze St / Pretoria St, Abel Rd, Joe Slovo Dr (M31), Raleigh St, Hunter St / Rockey St, Observatory Ave, Marcia St	
M19	North/South	M38 (The Hill) – M34 (cosigned) – N17 – M31 – M2 – R29 (Benrose)	The Hill, Regents Park, City Deep, Benrose	Johannesburg	Southern Klipriviersberg Rd, 3rd Ave, Drakensberg Rd, East Rd, Southern Klipriviersberg Rd, Vickers Rd, Ruven Rd	
M20	East/West	M7/M13 (Windsor East) – R512 – M30 – M71 – M27 – M9 – M1 – M31 (cosigned) – M11 – M40 – R25 (Lyndhurst)	Windsor East, Darrenwood, Linden, Victory Park, Emmarentia, Greenside, Parkwood, Melrose Estate, Oaklands, Highlands North, Kew, Lyndhurst	Randburg, Johannesburg	Republic Rd, 3rd Ave, Linden Rd, Gleneagles Rd, Chester Rd, Bolton Rd, Glenhove Rd, Pretoria Ave, Athol St, Pretoria Rd	
M22	East/West	M7/M13 (Windsor East) – R512 – M30 – M71 – M27 – M9 – M1 – M31 (cosigned) – M11 – M40 – R25 (Lyndhurst)	Windsor East, Darrenwood, Linden, Victory Park, Emmarentia, Greenside, Parkwood, Melrose Estate, Oaklands, Highlands North, Kew, Lyndhurst	Randburg, Johannesburg	Republic Rd, 3rd Ave, Linden Rd, Gleneagles Rd, Chester Rd, Bolton Rd, Glenhove Rd, Pretoria Ave, Athol St, Pretoria Rd	
M27	North/South	M1 (Booysens) – M7 (cosigned) – R41 – R24 – M10 – M18 – M71 – M1 – M16 (cosigned) – R25 – M20 – M30 (cosigned) – M81 – M71 (Blairgowrie)	Booysens, Selby, Marshalltown, Johannesburg CBD, Braamfontein, Parktown, Westcliff, Parkview, Saxonwold, Parkwood, Parktown North, Dunkeld West, Hyde Park, Craighall, Craighall Park, Blairgowrie	Johannesburg, Sandton, Randburg	Booysens Rd, Simmonds Avenue, Queen Elizabeth Bridge, Jan Smuts Ave	
M30	East/West	M18 (Delarey) – M5 – M20 – M71 – M27 (cosigned) – M9 (cosigned) – M1 – M31 – M11 – R25 (Rembrandt Park)	Delarey, Newlands, Albertskroon, East Town, Franklin Roosevelt Park, Emmarentia, Greenside, Parkhurst, Parktown North, Rosebank, Dunkeld, Illovo, Fairway, Birnham, Bramley, Kew, Lombardy West, Corlett Gardens, Rembrandt Park	Roodepoort, Johannesburg	Mollie Rd, Long Rd, 5th St, Milner Rd, Preller Dr, Hofmeyr Dr, Tana Rd, Victory Rd, 6th St, 7th Ave, Jan Smuts Ave (M27), Jellicoe Ave, Oxford Rd (M9), Corlett Dr, 9th Rd, Canning Rd, Main Rd, Wordsworth Rd	
M31	North/South	R554 (Raceview) – M48 – N12 – M38 / M46 – M34 – N17 - M33 – M19 – M2 – R29 – R24 – M10 – M18 (cosigned) – M11 – M1 – M16 (cosigned) – R25 – M20 (cosigned) – M30 (Bramley)	Raceview, New Redruth, Florentia, Southcrest, Tulisa Park, Elandspark, City Deep, Johannesburg CBD, New Doornfontein, Berea, Houghton Estate, Oaklands, Waverley, Bramley	Alberton, Johannesburg	Heidelberg Rd, Ring Rd East, Voortrekker Rd, Heidelberg Rd, Joe Slovo Dr, St Andrew Rd, Houghton Dr, West St, Central St, Pretoria Ave (M20), Athol Oaklands Rd, Scott St	
M32	East/West	M39 (Cresslawn) – M92 – M84 – M57 (cosigned) – M45 – M96 - R21 – R23 – M44 (Benoni AH)	Cresslawn, Spartan, Rhodesfield, Kempton Park CBD, Pomona AH, Bredell AH, Benoni AH	Kempton Park, Benoni	Plane Rd, Pretoria Rd (M57), Pomona Rd, 3rd Rd, 3rd Ave, Elm Rd, Birch Rd	
M33	North/South	M31 (City Deep) – R29 – M14 – M22 – M97 – R24 – M18 – M16 – R25 (Sydenham)	City Deep, Rosherville, Heriotdale, Cleveland, Malvern, Kensington, Bruma, Cyrildene, Observatory, Linksfield, Fairwood, Orange Grove, Sydenham	Johannesburg	Houer St, Lower Germiston Rd, Cleveland Rd, 31st St, Monmouth Rd, Pandora Rd, Queen St, Friedland Ave, Cooper St, Frederick St, Louise St, Grace Rd, Sylvia Pass St, Goodman Terr, 7th St, 9th Ave,	
M34	East/West	M17 (Ormonde) – M7 – M9 – M11 – M19 (cosigned) - M31 (Elandspark)	Ormonde, Robertsham, Southdale, West Turffontein, Turffontein, Kenilworth, La Rochelle, Rosettenville, The Hill, Rewlatch, South Hills, Elandspark	Johannesburg	Northern Pkway, Alamein Rd, Webb Rd, Turf Club Rd, Geranium St, Drakensberg Rd, Glensands Ave East, East Rd, Southern Klipriviersberg Rd	
M35	North/South	R103 (Boksburg AH) – M43 – R554 – M94 – M46 (Martin du Preezville)	Boksburg AH, Rondebult, Groeneweide, Klippoortje, Elspark, Reiger Park, Martin du Preezville	Boksburg, Germiston	Heidelberg Rd, Boksburg Rd	
M36	East/West	R24 (Oatlands) – R563 – R28 – R24 (cosigned) – R558 / M18 (Factoria)	Oatlands, Krugersdorp West, Burgershoop, Krugersdorp CBD, Wentworth Park, Factoria	Krugersdorp	Rustenburg Rd, Commissioner St, Coronation St, Main Reef Rd (R24), Barratt Rd	
M37	North/South	Tsongweni – R554 – M49 – M94 (cosigned) - N17 – M48 – M93 - M46 – M49 – M2 – M53 (cosigned) – R29 (cosigned) – M57 – M14 – M98 - M52 – N12 – R24 – M59 – R25 - N3 (Lakeside)	Tsongweni, Wadeville, Dinwiddie, Lambton, Denlee, Delville, South Germiston, Germiston CBD, Delport, Primrose, Dawnview, Solheim, Rietfontein, Meadowbrook, Hurleyvale, Edenvale CBD, Lakeside	Katlehong, Germiston, Edenvale	Black Reef Rd, Wits Rifles Rd, Russell Rd, Lake Rd, Joubert St, President St, Exodus Rd (M53), Johann Rissik Rd, Shamrock Rd, AG de Witt Dr, Edenvale Rd, van Riebeeck Rd, St John Rd, 17th Ave, Andries Pretorius Rd, van Riebeeck Ave	
M38	East/West	R553 (Naturena) – M68 – M5 – M17 – M7 – M11 – M19 – R59 – M31 / M46 (Tulisa Park)	Naturena, Comptonville, Meredale, Southgate, Ridgeway, Crown Gardens, Robertsham, Gillview, Towerby, Rosettenville, The Hill, South Hills, Tulisa Park	Johannesburg	Main Rd, Rifle Range Rd, Verona St, South Rand Rd	Sometimes signed as route in Midrand
M39	North/South	M94 (Wadeville) – M53 (cosigned) – M46 (cosigned) – R29 (cosigned) – M57 – M52 - M44 – M59 – M99 - M16 – M92 – M32 – M88 - M90 – R25 – M18 (Pretoria) – R101 – N1 – R55 (Kyalami Gardens)	Wadeville, Klippoortje, Elsburg, Tedstoneville, Germiston South, Knights, Primrose, Woodmere, Marlands, Homestead, Elandsfontein, Kruinhof, Elandsfontein Rail, Isando, Croydon, Creslawn, Estherpark, Kempton Park West, Chloorkop, Lethabong, Halfway House Estate, Vorna Valley, Kyalami Hills, Kyalami Gardens	Germiston, Kempton Park, Midrand	Guthrie Rd, Brug St, Olivier Rd (M53), Simon Bekker Rd, Lower Boksburg Rd (M46), Knights Rd, Stanley St, Main Reef Rd (R29), Homestead Rd, Barbara Rd, Isando Rd, Zuurfontein Rd, Allandale Rd, Kyalami Rd	
M40	East/West; North/South	M75 (Sandhurst) – M64 – M9 – M85 – M1 – M11 – M54 – M30 – M20 (cosigned) – R25 – M16 – M97 – M98 – M52 (Bedford Gardens)	Sandhurst, Sandown, Wynberg, Kew, Lyndhurst, Sunningdale, Silvamonte, Sandringham, St Andrews, Essexwold, Bedfordview, Oriel, Bedford Gardens	Sandton, Johannesburg, Bedfordview	Grayston Dr, Andries St South, Arkwright Dr, 2nd Ave, Pretoria Rd (M20), Kernick Rd, Dartford Ave, Daleview Rd, Northfield Ave, Avon Rd, Swemmer Rd, Club St, Clivin Dr, Boeing Rd West, Van der Linde Rd	
M41	North/South	R21 (Ravenwood) – M44 – N12 – R21 – M57 (Jet Park)	Ravenwood, Everleigh, Bartlett, Jet Park	Boksburg	Rondebult Rd, Yaldwyn Rd, Taljard Rd, Jones Rd, Griffiths Rd	
M43	North/South	M53 (Sotho Section) – N3 – R103 – R21 – R554 – M46 – M56 – R29 – M44 – N12 - M45 (joins) – R21 – M32 – M45 (leaves) - M91 – M57 (Birchleigh)	Sotho Section, Mfundo Park, Somalia Park, Villa Liza, Dawn Park, Windmill Park, Vandyk Park, Boksburg East Industrial, Anderbolt, Westwood AH, Impala Park, Atlas, Clear Water Estate, Bonaero Park, Pomona AH, Nimrod Park, Aston Manor, Glen Marais, Birchleigh	Vosloorus, Boksburg, Kempton Park	Bierman Rd, Barry Marais Rd, Van dyk Rd, Atlas Rd, Dann Rd, Veld St, Vlei St,	
M44	East/West	M39 (Elandsfontein) – M57 (cosigned) – N12 – R21 – M41 – M43 – M32 – R51 (Benoni AH)	Elandsfontein, Jet Park, Witfield, Hughes Settlements, Everleigh, Bardene, Beyers Park, Lakefield, Farrarmere, Northmead, Morehill, Rynfield, Fairlead AH, Benoni AH	Germiston, Boksburg, Benoni	North Reef Rd, Jet Park Rd, North Rand Rd, Lakefield Ave, Main Rd, 5th Ave, Snake Rd (M45), Pretoria Rd	
M45	North/South	R51 (near Dunnottar) – M63 – N17 – R554 (cosigned) – M46 (cosigned) – M56 (cosigned) – R29 (cosigned) – N12 – M44 (cosigned) – R23 (cosigned) – M43 (joins) – R21 – M32 – M43 (leaves) – M91 – M57 (Kempton Park CBD)	Dunnottar, Langaville, Kwa Thema Ext 7, White City, Deep Levels, Reservoir, Vulcania South, Witpoort Estates, Vulcania, Brakpan CBD, Anzac, Apex, Mackenzie Park, Morehill, Rynfield, Northmead, Brentwood, Bonaero Park, Nimrod Park, Kempton Park CBD	Nigel, Tsakane, Kwa-Thema, Brakpan, Benoni, Kempton Park	Dunnottar Aerodrome Dr, Vlakfontein Rd, 12th Ave, Ergo Rd, Springs Rd (R554), Denne Rd, Goods St, Voortrekker Rd (M46), Prince George Ave, Main Reef Rd, Snake Rd, O'Reilly Merry St, Cecelia Nestadt Rd, Great North Rd, Van Riebeeck Rd	
M46	East/West	M38/M31 (Tulisa Park) – N3/N12 – M48 (cosigned) – M93 – M37 – M49 – M53 – M39 (cosigned) – M35 – R21 (cosigned) – M56 – M43 – R23 – M45 (cosigned) – M56 – R51 – R29 (Casseldale)	Tulisa Park, Elandspark, Gosforth Park, South Germiston, Industries East, Delmore Park, Martin du Preezville, Boksburg CBD, Boksburg South, Boksburg East Industrial, Van Dykpark, Dalpark, Dalview, Brakpan CBD, Brenthurst, Dal Fouche, New Era, Springs CBD, Casseldale	Johannesburg, Germiston, Boksburg, Brakpan, Springs	Rand Airport Rd, Power St, Linton-Jones St, Lower Boksburg Rd, Commissioner St, Rondebult Rd (R21), Leeuwpoort Rd, Jubilee Rd, Airport Rd, Athlone St, Hendrik Potgieter Rd, Van Der Walt Rd, Voortrekker Rd, Prince George Ave, Olympia Rd, South Main Reef Rd, 5th Ave, Colliery Rd, Driehoek Rd, Clydesdale Rd	
M47	North/South	M18 (Delarey) – M8 – M69 – M86 – R564 – M67 – N14 / R28 (Ruimsig)	Delarey, Florida North, Florida Hills, Floracliffe, Constantia Kloof, Weltevreden Park, Allens Nek, Strubens Valley, Little Falls, Wilgeheuwel, Ruimsig	Roodepoort	Hendrik Potgieter Rd	Old R47
M48	North/South; East/West	M31 (Florentia) – M94 – M46 (cosigned) – M37 – M49 (Webber)	Florentia, Alberton CBD, Elandshaven, Gosforth Park, Denlee, Webber,	Alberton, Germiston	Du Plessis Rd, 2nd Ave, Andries Pretorius St, Van Riebeeck Ave, Alberton Rd, Rand Airport Rd (M46), Rand Airport Rd	
M49	North/South	M53 (Klippoortje) – M48 - M46 – M37 (Georgetown)	Estera, Lambton, Klippoortje North, Webber, Delville, South Germiston, Georgetown	Germiston	Webber Rd	
M52	East/West	M14 (Malvern East) – N3/M40 – M98 – M37 – M39 (Elandsfontein)	Malvern East, Bedford Gardens, Oriel, Bedfordview, Rietfontein, Sunnyrock, Sunnyridge, Activia Park, Elandsfontein	Germiston, Bedfordview	Van Buuren Rd, North Reef Rd,	
M53	North/South	M7 (Zonkizizwe) – M43 – N3 – R103 – R554 – M94 – N17 – M49 – M39 (cosigned) – M46 – M37 (cosigned) – R29 – M14 (Primrose Hill)	Zonkizizwe, Moleleki, Mabuya Park, Sotho Section, Spruitview, Roodebult, Roodekop, Buhle Park, Wadeville, Estera, Elsburg, Tedstoneville, Delville, South Germiston, Georgetown, West Germiston, Germiston CBD, Primrose Hill	Katlehong, Vosloorus, Germiston	Kaunda St, Mercury St, Leondale Rd, Osborne Rd, Olivier St, Elsburg Rd, Meyer St/Victoria St, Exodus Rd, Johan Rissik Rd	
M54	East/West	M40 (Wynberg) – N3 – R25 (Lakeside)	Wynberg, Alexandra, East Bank, Far East Bank, Modderfontein, Lakeside	Sandton, Alexandra	Arkwright Ave, Wynberg Rd, London Rd, Peace St	
M56	East/West	M46 (Boksburg South) – M43 – R23 (cosigned) – M45 (cosigned) – M46 – R29/R51 – R555 (Everest)	Boksburg South, Boksburg East Industrial, Benoni South, Rangeview Camp, Harry Gwala, Leachville, Anzac, Brakpan CBD, Huntingdon, Krugersrus, New State Areas, Rowhill, East Geduld, Petersfield, Everest	Boksburg, Benoni, Brakpan, Springs	Commissioner St, Lincoln Rd, Birmingham St, Lancaster Rd, Range View Rd (R23), New Kleinfontein Rd, Grey Ave, Prince George St (M45), Voortrekker Rd, Craven St, Hospital Rd, South Main Reef Rd, Cowles St, E Geduld Rd, Enstra Rd	
M57	North/South	R29/M37 (Primrose) – M39 – N12 – M44 (cosigned) – M41 – M99 – M16 – M32 (cosigned) – M90 – M45 – M89 - M43 – R23 – R25 (cosigned) – R562 – enters City of Tshwane	Primrose, Marlands, Elandsfontein, Jet Park, Isando, Rhodesfield, Kempton Park CBD, Allen Grove, Glen Marais, Birchleigh, Caleni, Hospital View, Clayville	Germiston, Boksburg, Kempton Park, Tembisa	Pretoria Rd, Kraft Rd, N Reef Rd (M44), Jet Park Rd, Pretoria Rd	
M59	North/South	M39 (Klopper Park) – M99 – M16 – M92 – M78 – M37 (Eastleigh)	Klopper Park, Croydon, Sebenza, Edenglen, Eastleigh	Germiston, Kempton Park, Edenvale	Barbara Rd, Driefontein Rd, Lunik Rd, Terrace Rd	
M60	East/West	N3 (Modderfontein) – M74 – M11 – M1 – M85 (Kramerville)	Modderfontein, Kelvin, Marlboro Gardens, Kramerville	Sandton	Marlboro Dr	
M61	North/South	Enters from Midvaal – R550 – M7 (cosigned) – M82 – R554 (Alrode)	Eden Park, Alrode South, Alrode	Alberton	Vereeniging Rd	
M63	North/South	R550 (near Nigel) – M45 – N17 – R51 (Pollak Park)	Prosperita, Dunnottar, Sharon Park, Selcourt, Selection Park, Pollak Park	Nigel, Springs	Nigel-Dunnottar Rd, Nigel Rd, Coaton Ave, Tonk Meter Way	
M64	North/South	M85 (Sandown) – M9 – M40 – M81 – M71 – M74 – M75 – R564 (Douglasdale)	Sandown, Morningside, Benmore Gardens, Northern Acres, River Club, Bryanston, Douglasdale	Sandton	West St, Benmore Rd, Outspan Rd, Ballyclare Dr, St. Audley Rd, Grosvenor Rd, Douglas Dr	
M67	North/South	R41 (Witpoortjie) – R24 – M18 (cosigned) – M86 – M47 – M5 – R114 (near Cosmo City)	Princess, Wilropark, Willowbrook, Zandspruit, Sonnedal	Roodepoort	Corlett Ave, Ontdekkers Dr (M18), C.R. Swart Dr, Doreen Rd, Peter Rd, Koniefer St, Copperhouse Rd	
M68	East/West; North/South	R554 (Lenasia) – M72 – M77 – M10 – M83 – N1 – R553 – M38 – R82 – M7 – R556 (Mulbarton)	Lenasia, Klipriviersoog, Chiawelo, Dhlamini, Moroka, Klipspruit, Power Park, Diepkloof, Mondeor, Winchester Hills, Suideroord, Glenanda, Glenvista, Mulbarton	Lenasia, Soweto, Johannesburg	Abubaker Asvat Dr, Chris Hani Rd, Columbine Ave, Vorster Ave, True North Rd	
M69	North/South	R564 (Florida) – M18 – M86 – M5 – M6 (Weltevreden Park)	Florida CBD, Florida Park, Constantia Kloof, Weltevreden Park	Roodepoort	Golf Club Terr, J.G. Strydom Rd,	
M70	East/West	M77 (Mmesi Park) – M10 – M83 – N1 – M5 – M7 (Ophirton)	Mmesi Park, Meadowlands West, Meadowlands East, Orlando, Noordgesig, Diepkloof, Theta, Booysens Reserve, Ophirton	Soweto, Johannesburg	Van Onselen St, Vincent Rd, Reverend Frederick S Modise Dr, Soweto Hwy, Ophir Booysens Rd	
M71	North/South	M11 (Parktown) – M9 – M27 – M1 – M7 – M17 – M16 – M20 – M30 – M8 – M13 – M27 – M6 – M75 – M64 – M81 – M74 – R564 – R55 (cosigned) - N1 - R101 (Randjespark)	Parktown, Richmond, Westcliff, Emmarentia, Greenside, Victory Park, Linden, Robindale, Ferndale, Kensington B, Bryanston, Magaliesig, Lonehill, Glenferness, Kyalami, Beaulieu, Crowthorne AH, Carlswald, Randjespark	Johannesburg, Randburg, Sandton, Midrand	Empire Rd, Barry Hertzog Ave, Rustenburg Rd, 1st Ave, Bram Fischer Dr, Main Rd, Main Rd (R55), Arthur Ave, Neptune Ave, Walton Rd, New Rd	
M72	North/South	M68 (Moroka) – M77 (Mofolo North)	Moroka, Molapo, Moletsane, Jabulani, Zondi, Mofolo North	Soweto	Koma St	
M74	East/West	M75 (Bryanston) – M64 – M81 – M71 – M9 (Cosigned) – M85 – M11 – M60 (Marlboro Gardens)	Bryanston, Morningside, Wendywood, Eastgate, Marlboro Gardens	Sandton	Bryanston Dr, Summit Rd, Rivonia Rd (M9), South Rd	
M75	East/West	M64 (Bryanston) – M74 – M71 – M81 (join) – M13 – M81 (leave) – M40 – M9/M85 (Sandhurst)	Bryanston, Lyme Park, Hurlingham, Glenadrienne, Parkmore, Sandhurst	Sandton	Cumberland Ave, Homestead Ave, Peter Pl, Winnie Mandela Dr (M81), Sandton Dr	
M77	North/South	M68 (Moroka) – M79 – M72 – M70 – R41 (Cresswell Park)	Moroka, Jabavu, Mofolo North, Dobsonville, Mmesi Park, Bram Fischerville, Cresswell Park	Soweto, Roodepoort	Elias Motsoaledi St	
M78	North/South	R25 (Illiondale) – M59 – M16 – M99 – M59 (Klopperpark)	Illiondale, Sebenza, Edenglen, Harmelia, Klopperpark	Edenvale, Germiston	Laurie Rd, Betshana Rd, Harris Ave, Shelton Ave, Kruin St	
M79	East/West	M77 (Jabavu) – M10 – M83 – N1 – M5 (Nasrec)	Jabavu, Mofolo Central, Dube, Orlando West, Orlando East, Diepkloof, Nasrec	Soweto, Johannesburg	Zulu Dr, Mahalefele Rd, Pela St, Kumalo St, Sotasonke St, Masupha St, Ben Naude Dr, Rand Show Rd	Sometimes signed as M12
M80	North/South	M7 (Southdowns) – M82 – R554 (cosigned) – M95 (Randhart)	Southdowns, Albertsdal, Mayberry Park, Alrode, Randhart	Alberton	J.G. Strydom Rd, Potgieter St, Swartkoppies Rd (R554), Jacqueline Ave,	
M81	North/South	M27 (Hyde Park) – M75 (joins) – M13 – M75 (leaves) – M64 – M71 – M74 – N1/R511 (Epsom Downs)	Hyde Park, Sandhurst, Hurlingham, Parkmore, Glenadrienne, Bryanston, Epsom Downs	Sandton	Winnie Mandela Dr	
M82	North/South	M61 (Alrode South) – M80 – R554 – M95 (Meyersdal)	Alrode South, Brackenhurst, Meyersdal	Alberton	Hennie Alberts St	
M83	North/South	M68 (Diepkloof – M79 – M70 (Diepkloof)	Diepkloof	Soweto	Immink Dr	
M84	North/South	M32 (Cresslawn) – M90 – M89 – R25 – M88 (Norkem Park)	Cresslawn, Kempton Park CBD, Van Riebeeck Park, Houtkapper Park, Norkem Park	Kempton Park	Kelvin Dr, Besembos Ave, Panorama Ave, Soutpansberg Dr, Mooirivier Dr	
M85	North/South	M9/M75 (Sandown) – M64 – M40 – M60 – M74 – R564 (Sunninghill)	Sandown, Eastgate, Wendywood, Gallo Manor, Woodmead, Sunninghill	Sandton	Katherine St, Bowling Ave	
M86	East/West	R24 (Oatlands) – R563 – R28 – M67 – R564 (cosigned) – M47 – M69 – M5 (Randpark Ridge)	Oatlands, Munsieville, Dan Pienaarville, Rant-en-Dal, Noordheuwel, Rangeview, Roodekrans, Wilropark, Helderkruiun, Kloofendal, Constantia Kloof, Weltevreden Park, Randpark Ridge	Krugersdorp, Roodepoort, Randburg	Robert Broom Dr, Wilgeroord Rd, Christiaan de Wet Rd (R564), Jim Fouche Dr	M86 sometimes signed as route in Kempton Park
M88	East/West	R25 (Estherpark) – M39 – M90 – R25 – Terenure. Terenure - M84 – R25 (Birchleigh North)	Estherpark, Edleen, Kempton Park West, Terenure, Birch Acres, Norkem Park, Birchleigh North	Kempton Park	Parkland Ave, Rienert Ave, Terenure St; Pongolarivier Dr, Mooifontein Rd (unconnected section)	Two sections unconstructed
M89	East/West	R25 (Van Riebeeckpark) – M84 – M57 (Birchleigh)	Van Riebeeck Park, Birchleigh	Kempton Park	De Wiekus Rd, Elgin Rd	
M90	East/West	M39 (Estherpark) – M92 – M84 – M57 – M91 (Kempton Park CBD)	Estherpark, Edleen, Van Riebeeckpark, Kempton Park CBD	Kempton Park	C.R. Swart Rd	
M91	North/South	M96 (Kempton Park CBD) – M90 – M45 – M43 (Aston Manor)	Kempton Park CBD, Nimrod Park, Aston Manor	Kempton Park	Monument Rd	
M92	North/South	M59 (Croydon) – M39 -M32 – M90 – M86 (Van Riebeeckpark)	Croydon, Spartan, Cresslawn, Edleen, Van Riebeeckpark	Kempton Park	Serena Rd, Green Ave	
M93	Northwest/Southeast	M2 (Driehoek) – M46 – M37 (Webber)	Driehoek, South Germiston, Webber	Germiston	Refinery Rd	
M94	East/West	M48 (Alberton CBD) – N3 – M37 (cosigned) – M53 – M39 – M35 (Cruywagenpark	Alberton CBD, Florentia, Verwoerdpark, Albermarle, Dinwiddie, Wadeville, Cruywagenpark	Germiston, Alberton	Kritzinger Rd, Grey Ave, Black Reef Rd (M37), Dekema Rd, Sarel Hattingh St	
M95	East/West	M7 (Mulbarton) – M68 – M11 – M82 – R59 – M80 – R554 (Randhart)	Mulbarton, Glenvista, Meyersdal, Randhart	Johannesburg, Alberton	Bellairs Dr, Michelle Ave	
M96	East/West	M57 (Kempton Park CBD) – M91 – M32 – R21 (Kempton Park CBD)	Kempton Park CBD	Kempton Park	Voortrekker Rd, Long Street	
M97	East/West	M22 (Kensington) – M40 – M16 (Edenvale CBD)	Kensington, Bedfordview, Dunvegan, Edenvale CBD	Johannesburg, Bedfordview, Edenvale	Nicol Rd, Skeen Blvd, Concorde Rd East, Boeing Rd East, 1st Ave	
M98	East/West	M22 (Kensington) – M40 – M52 – M37 (Bedfordview)	Kensington, Oriel, Bedfordview	Johannesburg, Bedfordview	Smith Rd, Kloof Rd	
M99	East/West	M57 (Isando) – M39 – M59 – M78 – M37 (Meadowbrook)	Isando, Klopperpark, Meadowdale, Meadowbrook	Kempton Park, Germiston, Bedfordview	Electron Ave, Herman Rd	

== See also ==
- National Roads in South Africa
- Provincial Roads in South Africa
