= Mill Hill, Gauteng =

Mill Hill
- Location within Gauteng Location within South Africa
- Coordinates: 26.070°S 28.011°E
- Country: South Africa
- Province: Gauteng
- Municipality: City of Johannesburg

Area
  - Total: 0.39 km^{2} (0.15 sq mi)

Population (2001)
  - Total: 678
  - Density: 1,700/km^{2} (4,500/sq mi)
- Time zone: UTC+2 (SAST)
- Postal code (street): 2191
- PO box: 2060

Mill Hill is a suburb of Johannesburg, South Africa. It is located in Region B of the City of Johannesburg Metropolitan Municipality. It is adjacent to Bryanston.
