= M79 (Johannesburg) =

Metropolitan route in the City of Johannesburg, South Africa

Metropolitan route M79

Route information
- Maintained by Johannesburg Roads Agency and Gauteng Department of Roads and Transport
- Length: 17.4 km (10.8 mi)

Major junctions
- West end: M77 at Jabavu

- M10 in Orlando M83 in Diepkloof; N1 / N12 near Aeroton
- East end: M5 at Nasrec

Location
- Country: South Africa

Highway system
- Numbered routes of South Africa
← M78	→ M80

The M79 is a short metropolitan route in Greater Johannesburg, South Africa. It connects Jabavu in the western part of Soweto with Nasrec via Orlando and Diepkloof. On physical street signs, it is signposted as the M12 on the eastern part of the route.

== Route ==
The M79 begins at a junction with the M77 (Elias Motsoaledi Road) in the Jabavu suburb of Soweto, heading eastwards as Zulu Drive. It passes through the Dube and Phefeni suburbs to reach a junction with the M10 road (Klipspruit Valley Road) and cross into the suburb of Orlando East. It becomes Sofasunke Road and continues eastwards to enter the Diepkloof suburb, where it becomes Ben Naude Street and intersects with the M83 road (Immunk Drive).

The M79 continues eastwards, becoming Rand Show Road, to exit Soweto and form an interchange with the N1 highway (Johannesburg Western Bypass; which goes north to Roodepoort and Randburg) and the N12 highway (Johannesburg Southern Bypass; which goes eastwards to Alberton). It continues eastwards, forming the northern boundary of the Aeroton industrial area, to end at a junction with the M5 road (Nasrec Road) just south of FNB Stadium in Nasrec.
