= River Club =

River Club may refer to:

- River Club, Gauteng, a suburb of Johannesburg in Gauteng, South Africa
- River Club of Jacksonville, a private club in Jacksonville, Florida, U.S.
- River Club, a private club housed in River House (New York City)
- River Club, Florida, a golf course community in Manatee County, Florida
