= M77 (Johannesburg) =

Metropolitan route in the City of Johannesburg, South Africa

Metropolitan route M77

Route information
- Maintained by Johannesburg Roads Agency and Gauteng Department of Roads and Transport
- Length: 9.8 km (6.1 mi)

Major junctions
- South end: M68 in Moroka

- M79 in Jabavu M72 in Mofolo North; M70 in Dobsonville
- North end: R41 in Roodepoort

Location
- Country: South Africa

Highway system
- Numbered routes of South Africa
| ← M75 | → M78 |

The M77 is a short metropolitan route in Greater Johannesburg, South Africa. It connects Moroka in Soweto with Roodepoort via Dobsonville. For its entire route, it is named Elias Motsoaledi Road.

== Route ==
The M77 begins at a junction with the M68 in the Moroka section of Soweto. It heads northwards for 10 kilometres, through Jabavu (where it meets the western terminus of the M79) and Dobsonville (where it meets the northern terminus of the M72 and the western terminus of the M70), to exit Soweto and reach its end at a junction with the R41 in Roodepoort, in the suburb of Cresswell Park (south of the town centre).
