= M80 (Johannesburg) =

Metropolitan route in Greater Johannesburg, South Africa

Metropolitan route M80

Route information
- Maintained by Johannesburg Roads Agency and Gauteng Department of Roads and Transport
- Length: 8.6 km (5.3 mi)

Major junctions
- South end: M7
- North end: M95

Location
- Country: South Africa

Highway system
- Numbered routes of South Africa
← M79	→ M81

The M80 is a short metropolitan route in Greater Johannesburg, South Africa.

== Route ==
The M80 begins as an intersection with Kliprivier Drive (M7) and heads northwards as JG Strijdom Drive through Albersdal. It crosses Hennie Alberts Street (M82) and then Delphinium Street as it passes through Mayberry Park and the industrial suburb of Alrode. There it intersects Potgieter Street as a T-junction where the route heads north as that road for a short distance before reaching Swartkoppies Road (R554). It co-signs with the R554 for a very short distance before the route resumes north-west as Jacqueline Street in Randhart. It ends there as an intersection with Nelson Mandela Drive (M95).
