= Megawatt Park =

Location of the headquarters of Eskom

Coordinates: 26°2′15″S 28°5′7″E

Megawatt Park is the South African site of the electricity public utility Eskom's head office in Sunninghill, Sandton (City of Johannesburg Metropolitan Municipality). The complex includes the Megawatt Park Conference Centre.
