= M72 (Johannesburg) =

Metropolitan route in the City of Johannesburg, South Africa

Metropolitan route M72

Route information
- Maintained by Johannesburg Roads Agency and Gauteng Department of Roads and Transport
- Length: 6.8 km (4.2 mi)

Major junctions
- South end: M68 in Moroka

- North end: M77 in Mofolo

Location
- Country: South Africa

Highway system
- Numbered routes of South Africa
| ← M71 | → M74 |

The M72 road is a short metropolitan route in the City of Johannesburg, South Africa. It's a single ring-road through the centre of Soweto.

== Route ==
The M72 begins at a roundabout intersection with the M68 (Chris Hani Road) in the suburb of Moroka. It begins by heading westwards, then northwards, as Koma Road, passing by the Jabulani Civic Centre and the Jabulani Mall before heading north-east to end at an intersection with the M77 (Elias Motsoaledi Road) in the suburb of Mofolo.
