= M75 (Johannesburg) =

Metropolitan route in the City of Johannesburg, South Africa

Metropolitan route M75

Route information
- Maintained by Johannesburg Roads Agency and Gauteng Department of Roads and Transport
- Length: 9.6 km (6.0 mi)

Major junctions
- West end: M64 Grosvernor Road
- M71 Bram Fischer Drive; M81 Winnie Mandela Drive
- East end: M9 Rivonia Road

Location
- Country: South Africa

Highway system
- Numbered routes of South Africa
← M74	→ M77

The M75 is a short metropolitan route in Sandton, South Africa. It connects the suburb of Bryanston with the Sandton city centre.

== Route ==
The M75 begins at Grosvernor Road (M64) in Bryanston. It heads south as Cumberland Avenue hugging the Bryanston Country Club until the road splits turning south-east and becomes Homestead Avenue. Homestead reaches and crosses Main Road / Bram Fischer Drive (M71) and continues eastward passing the Sandton Medi Clinic and St Stithians College as Peter Place which ends as a T-junction with Winnie Mandela Drive (M81). Here co-signed with the M81, it heads south through Hurlingham and Parkmore until Winnie Mandela is intersected by Sandton Drive. Here the route leaves the M81 and heads eastwards to the city of Sandton and ends at Rivonia Road (M9) but the road continues east as Katherine Street (M85).
