= Sandown High School, Johannesburg =

Sandown High School
- Sandton, Gauteng; South Africa

Information
- Type: High school
- Established: 1970

Sandown High School is a school in Sandown, Sandton, north of Johannesburg. Sandown High is situated on the corner of Rivonia and Grayston drive.

== Notable alumni ==
Dino Covotsos – South African cybersecurity entrepreneur and founder of Telspace Systems."Dino Covotsos". LinkedIn.Moyo, Admire (16 May 2022). "Leadership changes at local info sec firm Telspace". ITWeb.

Refiloe Mpakanyane – South African radio and television broadcaster."Refiloe Mpakanyane". LinkedIn."Q&A with Refiloe Mpakanyane". News24. 19 July 2018.

Nonhle Thema – South African television presenter.Thusi, Lucky (9 April 2014). "Club808 new presenter and move to eKasi+ channel". Alberton Record. Caxton Local Media.
