= Marlboro Gardens =

- Location within Gauteng Location within South Africa
- Coordinates: 26.090°S 28.096°E
- Country: South Africa
- Province: Gauteng
- Municipality: City of Johannesburg
- Main Place: Sandton

Area
  - Total: 2.38 km^{2} (0.92 sq mi)

Population (2011)
  - Total: 10,438
  - Density: 4,390/km^{2} (11,400/sq mi)

Racial makeup (2011)
  - Black African: 18.3%
  - Coloured: 0.7%
  - Indian/Asian: 79.2%
  - White: 0.2%
  - Other: 1.6%

First languages (2011)
  - English: 22.7%
  - Zulu: 16.7%
  - Tsonga: 13.8%
  - Northern Sotho: 13.8%
  - Other: 33.0%
- Time zone: UTC+2 (SAST)
- Postal code (street): 2090
- PO box: 2063

Marlboro Gardens is a suburb of Johannesburg, South Africa. It is located in Region E of the City of Johannesburg Metropolitan Municipality. Under apartheid, it was an Indian township associated with Sandton.

== See also ==
Marlboro, Gauteng
