= Gallo Manor =

- Location within Gauteng Location within South Africa
- Coordinates: 26.066°S 28.077°E
- Country: South Africa
- Province: Gauteng
- Municipality: City of Johannesburg
- Main Place: Sandton

Area
  - Total: 2.02 km^{2} (0.78 sq mi)

Population (2011)
  - Total: 4,077
  - Density: 2,020/km^{2} (5,230/sq mi)

Racial makeup (2011)
  - Black African: 29.8%
  - Coloured: 2.0%
  - Indian/Asian: 12.0%
  - White: 54.5%
  - Other: 1.7%

First languages (2011)
  - English: 68.1%
  - Zulu: 5.6%
  - Afrikaans: 5.4%
  - Tswana: 3.3%
  - Other: 17.7%
- Time zone: UTC+2 (SAST)
- Postal code (street): 2191
- PO box: 2052

Gallo Manor is a suburb of Johannesburg, South Africa. It is located in Region E.

Much of the suburb is cordoned off as a gated settlement.

Gallo Manor is bounded by Wendywood and The Country Club Johannesburg. The suburb is near to Sandton and has good access to major arterial roads connecting to Fourways, Kyalami, Midrand and OR Tambo International Airport easy.
