= Sunninghill, Gauteng =

Sunninghill
- Location within Gauteng Location within South Africa
- Coordinates: 26°2′7″S 28°3′55″E
- Country: South Africa
- Province: Gauteng
- Municipality: City of Johannesburg
- Main Place: Sandton

Area
  - Total: 5.29 km^{2} (2.04 sq mi)

Population (2011)
  - Total: 11,260
  - Density: 2,130/km^{2} (5,510/sq mi)

Racial makeup (2011)
  - Black African: 25.4%
  - Coloured: 3.4%
  - Indian/Asian: 20.6%
  - White: 49.0%
  - Other: 1.7%

First languages (2011)
  - English: 69.9%
  - Afrikaans: 10.6%
  - Zulu: 3.6%
  - Xhosa: 2.6%
  - Other: 13.4%
- Time zone: UTC+2 (SAST)
- Postal code (street): 2191
- PO box: 2157

Sunninghill is a commercial and residential suburb of Sandton in Gauteng, South Africa. It is located in Region A of the City of Johannesburg Metropolitan Municipality. The N1 freeway, which at this area is eight lanes across, forms its southern boundary with access at Rivonia offramp. The K60 road runs through the centre of Sunninghill to assist in easing traffic. Sunninghill is bordered by the suburbs of Paulshof, Kyalami and Woodmead.

== Residential ==
The suburb comprises numerous townhouses, a living establishment commonly popular in new Johannesburg developments due to secured and often guarded boundaries and lower ownership cost than individual housing property. Many residents are skilled young adults working in financial, legal, culinary or consulting type industries.

== Commercial and business ==
Sunninghill Hospital is a first-class hospital in Johannesburg, managed by the Netcare Group. Many large corporations have offices in Sunninghill, including Acer, Eskom, PriceWaterhouseCoopers (before moving to Waterfall), CA, Inc, AstraZeneca, RCI, Massmart, and Unisys.

Primary shopping centres in Sunninghill include Chilli Lane (with retailers including Woolworths and Pick 'n Pay Stores and a Virgin Active gym); The Core (offices and restaurant retailers); and Sunninghill Shopping Centre (speciality restaurants and retailers Spar and Woolworths). There is an older centre, The Square, with anchor tenants Checkers and Cash Converters, and various food outlets and retailers.

== Educational facilities ==
St Peter's College is a secondary co-educational private school situated adjacent to Eskom Megawatt Park.
