= Edenburg, Gauteng =

Edenburg
- Location within Gauteng Location within South Africa
- Coordinates: 26.056°S 28.060°E
- Country: South Africa
- Province: Gauteng
- Municipality: City of Johannesburg
- City: Sandton

Area
  - Total: 2.92 km^{2} (1.13 sq mi)

Population (2011)
  - Total: 4,289
  - Density: 1,470/km^{2} (3,800/sq mi)

Racial makeup (2011)
  - Black African: 32.5%
  - Coloured: 3.4%
  - Indian/Asian: 11.0%
  - White: 50.5%
  - Other: 2.5%

First languages (2011)
  - English: 68.8%
  - Afrikaans: 6.6%
  - Zulu: 4.5%
  - Northern Sotho: 2.7%
  - Other: 17.4%
- Time zone: UTC+2 (SAST)
- Postal code (street): 2191
- PO box: 2128
- Area code: 011

Edenburg is a suburb of Sandton, South Africa. It is located in Region E of the City of Johannesburg Metropolitan Municipality. It is a section of Rivonia. Edenburg took its name from the farm by that name.
