= M71 (Johannesburg) =

Road in Johannesburg, South Africa

Metropolitan route M71

Route information
- Maintained by Johannesburg Roads Agency and Department of Roads and Transport (Gauteng)
- Length: 36.9 km (22.9 mi)

Major junctions
- South end: M11 Clarendon Place, Hillbrow
- M9 Victoria Avenue, Parktown; M27 Jan Smuts Avenue, Parktown; M1 Empire Road Junction, Parktown; M17 / M7 Empire Road, Parktown; M16 Greenhill Road, Emmarentia; M20 Gleneagles Road, Greenside; M30 Victory Road, Greenside; M8 1st Avenue, Linden; M13 Republic Road, Ferndale; M27 Jan Smuts Avenue, Ferndale; M6 Bond Street, Ferndale M75 Peter Place, Lyme Park M64 Grosvenor Road, Bryanston; M81 Winnie Mandela Drive, Bryanston M74 Bryanston Drive, Bryanston; R564 Witkoppen Road, Paulshof; R55 Pitts Avenue, Kyalami; N1 Ben Schoeman Freeway, Midrand
- North end: R101 Pretoria Main Road, Grand Central Airport

Location
- Country: South Africa

Highway system
- Numbered routes of South Africa
← M70	→ M72

The M71 is a major metropolitan route in the City of Johannesburg, South Africa. Starting in the northern CBD, it connects the centre of Johannesburg with the northern suburbs before ending in the outer northern city of Midrand.

== Route ==
The route begins at an intersection with the M11 Clarendon Place in Hillbrow. As Empire Road is a dual carriage way, the west–east road is signed as the M71 while the east–west route is cosigned with the M17. The route heads west in Parktown, passing Pieter Roos Park before crossing Victoria Avenue (M9) and then later passed Parktown Boys' High School. Here it crosses Jan Smuts Avenue (M27) for the first time, continuing to the first junction with the M1 motorway allowing the latter's south bound traffic to enter and exit. Passing under the M1, there is another exit for north bound traffic from the M1 to this route as well as access to Yale Road and Wits University. Continuing west, shortly before Owl Street (M7), a left exit to a bypass road to this route leaves Empire Avenue becomes a flyover over Owl Street and Empire Avenue bypassing the intersection of the latter with Barry Hertzog Avenue. The flyover joins just north of that intersection close to Milpark Hospital and the M71 now continues north as Barry Hertzog Avenue on the outskirts of Melville soon crossing the Braamfontein Spruit at the Parkview Golf Club.

It continues through Greenside as that suburbs main road, with the Linden Road (M20) route intersecting from the routes west and then our route crossing Tana and Victory Road's (M30) in the same suburb. The M71 now becomes Rustenburg Road, Linden before turning north-east passing the suburb of Victory Park and Delta Park as 1st Avenue. At a t-junction in Linden, the route heads north into Robindale as Bram Fischer Drive (formerly Henrik Verwoerd Drive) then north through Robin Acres and Blairgowrie crossing Republic Road (M13) and into Ferndale. Here it meets Jan Smuts Avenue's northern end and the M71 continues northwards as Bram Fischer Drive into Kensington B passing St Stithians College before crossing Peter Place, Lyme Park (M75) where it becomes Main Road. In Bryanston, Main Road crosses Winnie Mandela Drive (M81) continuing northwards intersecting Bryanston Drive before crossing the N1 freeway (Western Bypass) as a flyover into Paulshof. Here, still as Main Road, it intersects Witkoppen Road (R564) continuing north past Lone Hill and crosses the Jukskei River into the outskirts of Kyalami before reaching a t-junction with Pitts Avenue (R55).

Here, the M71 joins the R55 and they are one road northwards up to the Arthur Avenue junction, where it becomes Arthur Avenue eastwards. In the Crowthorne suburb of Midrand, It becomes Neptune Avenue south-eastwards before becoming Walton Road eastwards. Soon after, it becomes New Road and proceeds eastwards to cross the N1 highway (Ben Schoeman Freeway). It ends shortly after at a junction with the R101 (Pretoria Main Road) by the entrance to Grand Central Airport.
