= Westcliff, Gauteng =

Westcliff
- Location within Gauteng Location within South Africa
- Coordinates: 26°10′S 28°02′E
- Country: South Africa
- Province: Gauteng
- Municipality: City of Johannesburg
- Main Place: Johannesburg
- Established: 1905

Area
  - Total: 1.36 km^{2} (0.53 sq mi)

Population (2011)
  - Total: 1,790
  - Density: 1,320/km^{2} (3,410/sq mi)

Racial makeup (2011)
  - Black African: 42.6%
  - Coloured: 3.4%
  - Indian/Asian: 7.0%
  - White: 45.7%
  - Other: 1.4%

First languages (2011)
  - English: 54.9%
  - Afrikaans: 14.5%
  - Zulu: 7.7%
  - Tswana: 4.2%
  - Other: 18.6%
- Time zone: UTC+2 (SAST)
- Postal code (street): 2193

Westcliff is a wealthy suburb of Johannesburg, South Africa. It has many old mansions, and views over the Northern Suburbs. It is the site of the Westcliff Hotel also known as the Four Seasons Hotel. With a total wealth of $235 billion, Johannesburg is Africa’s wealthiest city, and most of the wealth in Johannesburg is concentrated in just four suburbs: Sandhurst, Houghton, Hyde Park and Westcliff.
