= River Club, Gauteng =

River Club
- Location within Gauteng Location within South Africa
- Coordinates: 26°4′12″S 28°2′41″E
- Country: South Africa
- Province: Gauteng
- Municipality: City of Johannesburg
- Main Place: Sandton

Area
  - Total: 2.87 km^{2} (1.11 sq mi)

Population (2011)
  - Total: 4,753
  - Density: 1,660/km^{2} (4,290/sq mi)

Racial makeup (2011)
  - Black African: 22.7%
  - Coloured: 2.0%
  - Indian/Asian: 5.8%
  - White: 67.0%
  - Other: 2.5%

First languages (2011)
  - English: 70.4%
  - Afrikaans: 5.5%
  - Zulu: 4.1%
  - Tswana: 2.8%
  - Other: 17.2%
- Time zone: UTC+2 (SAST)
- Postal code (street): 2191
- PO box: 2149

River Club is a suburb of Johannesburg in Gauteng, South Africa. It is a residential area in Sandton in City of Johannesburg Metropolitan Municipality. Residents of the area consist mostly of middle and upper-middle class citizens.

River Club borders the suburbs of Duxberry and Bryanston with the boundaries delineated by East Hertford in the east, Coleraine in the south, the Braamfontein Spruit in the north and William Nicol Drive in the east.

The suburb also contains one of the most exclusive golf course's in the country, a small community restaurant and an office-zoned development.

The postal code of the area is 2149 or 2191.
