= Village Deep, Johannesburg =

Village Deep
- Village Deep's location in Gauteng
- Coordinates: 26°13′25″S 28°02′45″E
- Country: South Africa
- Province: Gauteng
- City: Johannesburg
- Established: February 14, 1934

Area
  - Total: 0.25 km^{2} (0.097 sq mi)

Village Deep is a suburb of Johannesburg, South Africa, around 1.3 km south of City Hall. It is an industrial suburb one kilometer from north to south and less than 300 meters from east to west. To the west is the Genesis Landfill Facility, to the south is the railway and Stafford, to the east is Eloff Street, to the southeast is Robinson Deep, to the northeast is Selby, and to the north is New Centre. Village Deep was founded on February 14, 1934, on Turffontein and Booysen Estate farms. The name, which was originally The Village, comes from the nearby Village Deep Levels gold mine.

== Bibliography ==
- Raper, Peter Edmund (2004). New Dictionary of South African Place Names. Johannesburg/Cape Town: Jonathan Ball Publishers.
- Stals, Prof. Dr. E.L.P (ed.) (1978). Afrikaners in die Goudstad, vol. 1: 1886 - 1924. Cape Town/Pretoria: HAUM.
