= Parkmore =

- Location within Gauteng Location within South Africa
- Coordinates: 26°6′0″S 28°2′31″E
- Country: South Africa
- Province: Gauteng
- Municipality: City of Johannesburg
- Main Place: Sandton
- Established: 1907

Area
  - Total: 3.10 km^{2} (1.20 sq mi)

Population (2011)
  - Total: 6,455
  - Density: 2,080/km^{2} (5,390/sq mi)

Racial makeup (2011)
  - Black African: 27.3%
  - Coloured: 2.1%
  - Indian/Asian: 8.2%
  - White: 60.3%
  - Other: 2.1%

First languages (2011)
  - English: 69.1%
  - Afrikaans: 6.4%
  - Zulu: 4.7%
  - Tswana: 3.4%
  - Other: 16.4%
- Time zone: UTC+2 (SAST)
- Postal code (street): 2196

Parkmore is a suburb of Sandton in Johannesburg, South Africa. It is located in Region B of the City of Johannesburg Metropolitan Municipality.

== History ==
It was established as a suburb in 1907 and takes its name from two farms, Hurl Park and Benmore Farm.
