= Kyalami Business Park =

- Location within Gauteng Location within South Africa
- Coordinates: 25.9920°S 28.0709°E
- Country: South Africa
- Province: Gauteng
- Municipality: City of Johannesburg
- Main Place: Midrand
- Time zone: UTC+2 (SAST)
- Postal code (street): 1684

Kyalami Business Park is a suburb of Midrand, South Africa. It is located in Region A of the City of Johannesburg Metropolitan Municipality.
