= Kew, Gauteng =

Kew
- Location within Gauteng Location within South Africa
- Coordinates: 26°7′37″S 28°5′46″E
- Country: South Africa
- Province: Gauteng
- Municipality: City of Johannesburg
- Main Place: Johannesburg
- Established: 1905

Area
  - Total: 2.39 km^{2} (0.92 sq mi)

Population (2011)
  - Total: 5,959
  - Density: 2,490/km^{2} (6,460/sq mi)

Racial makeup (2011)
  - Black African: 85.2%
  - Coloured: 2.0%
  - Indian/Asian: 6.5%
  - White: 6.0%
  - Other: 0.3%

First languages (2011)
  - English: 27.0%
  - Zulu: 23.0%
  - Northern Sotho: 10.5%
  - Xhosa: 7.9%
  - Other: 31.6%
- Time zone: UTC+2 (SAST)
- Postal code (street): 2090

Kew is a suburb of Johannesburg, South Africa. It is located in Region E of the City of Johannesburg Metropolitan Municipality.

== History ==
It became a suburb in 1905 and is named after Kew Gardens in London.
