= Hyde Park, Gauteng =

Hyde Park
- Location within Gauteng Location within South Africa
- Coordinates: 26°7′19″S 28°2′26″E
- Country: South Africa
- Province: Gauteng
- Municipality: City of Johannesburg
- Main Place: Sandton
- Established: 1955

Area
  - Total: 2.80 km^{2} (1.08 sq mi)

Population (2001)
  - Total: 2,431
  - Density: 868/km^{2} (2,250/sq mi)
- Time zone: UTC+2 (SAST)
- Postal code (street): 3370

Hyde Park is a very wealthy suburb of Sandton, South Africa. It borders Illovo, Sandhurst, and Craighall Park. Hyde Park is located in Region B of the City of Johannesburg Metropolitan Municipality.

== History ==
The suburb is named after London's Hyde Park area. Hyde Park was declared a residential area in 1955.

== Economy ==
Virgin Atlantic has its South Africa office in Hyde Park.
