= Craighall Park =

- Location within Gauteng Location within South Africa
- Coordinates: 26°7′33″S 28°1′28″E
- Country: South Africa
- Province: Gauteng
- Municipality: City of Johannesburg
- Main Place: Randburg
- Established: 1945

Area
  - Total: 2.62 km^{2} (1.01 sq mi)

Population (2011)
  - Total: 5,625
  - Density: 2,150/km^{2} (5,560/sq mi)

Racial makeup (2011)
  - Black African: 26.9%
  - Coloured: 1.7%
  - Indian/Asian: 4.9%
  - White: 64.0%
  - Other: 2.5%

First languages (2011)
  - English: 72.5%
  - Afrikaans: 7.0%
  - Zulu: 4.6%
  - Tswana: 2.6%
  - Other: 13.3%
- Time zone: UTC+2 (SAST)
- Postal code (street): 2196

Craighall Park is a suburb of Johannesburg, South Africa. It is located in Region B of the City of Johannesburg Metropolitan Municipality. Residents of the suburb are represented by the CraigPark Residents Association.

== History ==
The suburb was established after 1945.

== Retail ==
Lancaster Shopping Centre, located on Jan Smuts Avenue in Craighall, became completely vacant after its last remaining shop closed in December 2025.
