= Braamfontein Spruit =

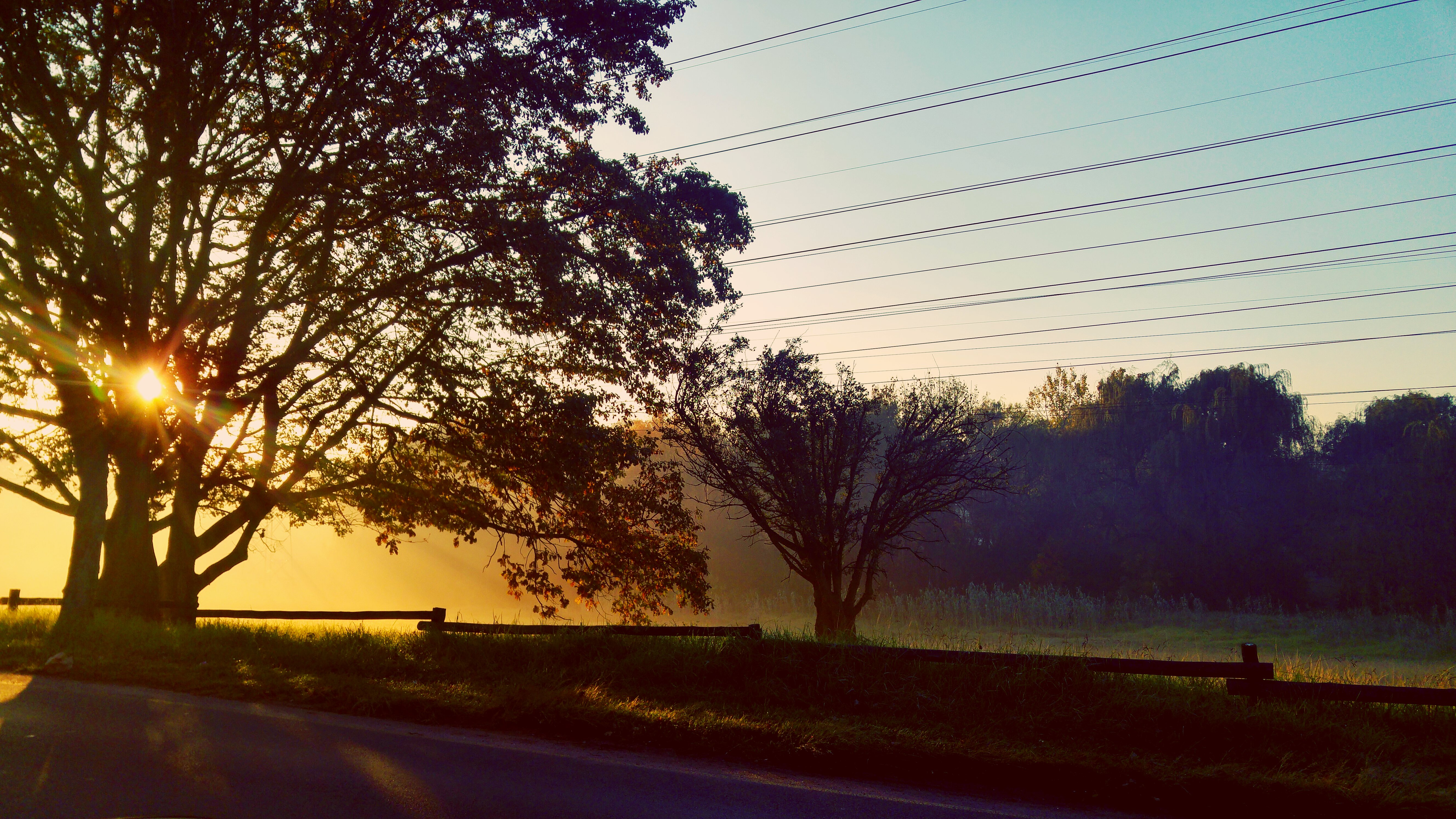
- Sunrise over the Braamfontein Spruit as viewed from Tana Road, Victory Park

- Location of the Braamfontein Spruit mouth

Location
- Country: South Africa
- Province: Gauteng
- District: City of Johannesburg
- City: Johannesburg, Randburg, Sandton

Physical characteristics
- Source: Natural Spring
  - location: Braamfontein, Johannesburg, South Africa
  - coordinates: 26.196°S 28.064°E
- Mouth: Jukskei River
  - coordinates: 26°00′53″S 28°03′10″E
  - elevation: 1,234 m (4,049 ft)
- Discharge
  - location: Jukskei River
  - average: 0 m^{3}/s (0 cu ft/s)

Basin features
- Tributaries
  - right: Sand Spruit

The Braamfontein Spruit (from the Afrikaans for "spring of brambles") is the longest stream in Johannesburg, South Africa.

It originates in Barnato Park High School, Braamfontein. It is covered and canalised near its source, but once the river runs out of the Parkview Golf Course, it runs through parkland, right to the edge of the city, so that Johannesburgers can still enjoy it in its original state. Walkers, runners and cyclists use a path along its banks every weekend in Gauteng, South Africa. From Berea the stream runs through Pieter Roos Park, down Empire Road to the Frank Brown Park, then on towards the German School in Parktown. The stream then flows towards the Parkview Golf Course, where sections of it are canalised. It exits the golf course and runs through Parkhurst, where it meets the second small tributary, the Westdene Spruit. The stream then flows through River Club, Bryanston, Rivonia and Sunninghill. Its largest tributary, the Sand Spruit, joins the stream in Sunninghill before it joins the Jukskei River in Leeuwkop Prison.

There is an ongoing effort to make this space a world class river park for the use of all Johannesburg residents.

== See also ==
- List of reservoirs and dams in South Africa
- List of rivers of South Africa
