= Sandhurst, Gauteng =

Sandhurst
- Location within Gauteng Location within South Africa
- Coordinates: 26°06′42″S 28°02′40″E
- Country: South Africa
- Province: Gauteng
- Municipality: City of Johannesburg
- Main Place: Sandton

Area
  - Total: 2.45 km^{2} (0.95 sq mi)

Population (2011)
  - Total: 2,471
  - Density: 1,010/km^{2} (2,610/sq mi)

Racial makeup (2011)
  - Black African: 39.3%
  - Coloured: 1.9%
  - Indian/Asian: 8.4%
  - White: 47.7%
  - Other: 2.7%

First languages (2011)
  - English: 57.9%
  - Zulu: 7.1%
  - Northern Sotho: 4.6%
  - Afrikaans: 4.5%
  - Other: 25.8%
- Time zone: UTC+2 (SAST)
- Postal code (street): 2196

Sandhurst is an affluent residential area in Sandton, in the City of Johannesburg Metropolitan Municipality, Gauteng, South Africa. It is one of the wealthiest suburbs in the country and is home to some of the most impressive mansions on the African continent. Part of the commercial centre of Sandton, known as Sandton City, entrances in Sandhurst.

A small few estates were built in the early 1900s; however, the majority were built in the middle and early-latter parts of the century between 1940 and 1970. Many of these properties have diminished in area, however, due to subdivisions.
