= Rivonia =

- Location within Gauteng Location within South Africa
- Coordinates: 26°3′5″S 28°3′47″E
- Country: South Africa
- Province: Gauteng
- Municipality: City of Johannesburg
- Main Place: Sandton

Area
  - Total: 0.95 km^{2} (0.37 sq mi)

Population (2011)
  - Total: 1,295
  - Density: 1,400/km^{2} (3,500/sq mi)

Racial makeup (2011)
  - Black African: 29.3%
  - Coloured: 1.5%
  - Indian/Asian: 12.4%
  - White: 54.3%
  - Other: 2.4%

First languages (2011)
  - English: 66.9%
  - Afrikaans: 7.0%
  - Sotho: 3.9%
  - Zulu: 3.2%
  - Other: 18.9%
- Time zone: UTC+2 (SAST)
- Postal code (street): 2191
- PO box: 2128

Rivonia is a suburb of Johannesburg, South Africa in the Sandton area. It is located in Region E of the City of Johannesburg Metropolitan Municipality. Rivonia is one of the most affluent residential and business suburbs of Johannesburg, and regarded as the hub of upstart and established I.T. companies. The main retail thoroughfare in the area, Rivonia Boulevard, is the location of several shopping complexes as well as many other shops and restaurants. The area known as Rivonia includes the original township of Edenburg, Edenburg Extension 1, and 19 smaller extensions designated 'Rivonia Extension ...', numbered from 0 to 25. There is no designated township (in the legal sense) called Rivonia. The post code for Rivonia is 2128.

== History ==
Rivonia lies between the Braamfontein Spruit and the Sandspruit, and was the location of Liliesleaf Farm (26°2′36″S 28°3′15″E), where in 1963 many of the accused in the Rivonia Treason Trial were arrested. The earliest public transport into Johannesburg was by donkey cart, later by bus.

A Carmelite Convent, accommodating Discalced Carmelite Nuns, sat in the centre of the village until displaced by commercial pressures. (They moved to Benoni.) In a commemorative move, the large shopping centre first built on the site was named The Cloisters. The earlier village lay on the direct path of access along Rivonia Road to the south to the new 'concrete' highway, with a nasty dogleg in the road at 12th Avenue. When it was decided to redesign and improve Rivonia Road through to the highway, the bowling greens and tennis courts of the Rivonia Recreation Club were in the way, and the Club relocated to a handsome new site in Achter Road in Paulshof, leaving only the Rivonia Hall and Library on the original site. Rivonia Produce, a landmark and long established family business, supplying inter alia hay to the many local horse owners, was also forced to move from the dogleg on 12th Avenue to a new building on 11th Avenue. It has since been swallowed into a national hardware chain and disappeared.

== Economy ==
Hewlett-Packard's main Southern Africa and South Africa office and the registered office of Fujitsu in South Africa are in Rivonia. Before Rivonia was incorporated into the new town of Sandton, along with Bryanston, Sandown and Morningside, it was administered by the Peri-Urban Areas Health Board.
