= Sandown, Gauteng =

Sandown
- Location within Gauteng Location within South Africa
- Coordinates: 26.098°S 28.060°E
- Country: South Africa
- Province: Gauteng
- Municipality: City of Johannesburg
- Main Place: Sandton

Area
  - Total: 3.74 km^{2} (1.44 sq mi)

Population (2011)
  - Total: 6,354
  - Density: 1,700/km^{2} (4,400/sq mi)

Racial makeup (2011)
  - Black African: 35.9%
  - Coloured: 3.0%
  - Indian/Asian: 18.0%
  - White: 39.8%
  - Other: 3.3%

First languages (2011)
  - English: 62.6%
  - Afrikaans: 5.0%
  - Zulu: 5.0%
  - Tswana: 3.2%
  - Other: 24.3%
- Time zone: UTC+2 (SAST)
- Postal code (street): 2196
- PO box: 2031

Sandown is an affluent suburb of Johannesburg, South Africa, in Sandton. It is located in Region E of the City of Johannesburg Metropolitan Municipality. Sandown is both a residential and commercial area and is home to the offices of many major national and international corporations as well as the Johannesburg Stock Exchange in the area known as Sandton Central. The Gautrain rapid rail system's Sandton Station is located in Sandown, linking Sandton to O.R. Tambo International Airport, Johannesburg Central and the Capital City, Pretoria.

Sandown is named after the town of Sandown, on the Isle of Wight, UK.

== Demographics ==
According to the South African National Census of 2001, 55.7% of the population were White, 35.4% Black African, 7.1% Indian or Asian and 1.8% Coloured.

65.5% spoke English, 7.8% Zulu, 6.0% Tswana, 5.0% Northern Sotho, 3.1% Afrikaans, 2.4% Xhosa, 2.1% Sotho, 1.7% Venda, 1.7% Tsonga, 0.8% Southern Ndebele. 0.4% Swazi and 3.4% some other language as their first language.
