= Sandton =

Area in Gauteng province, South Africa

- City
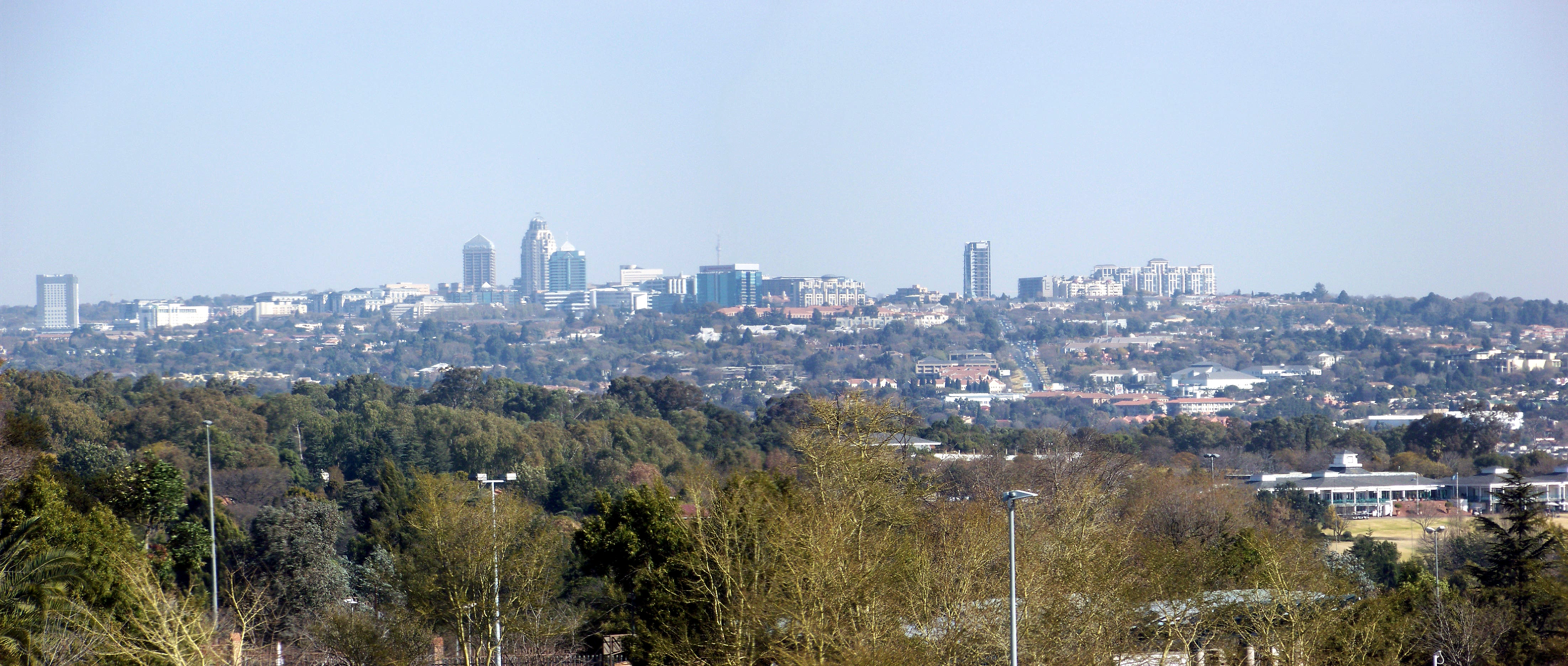
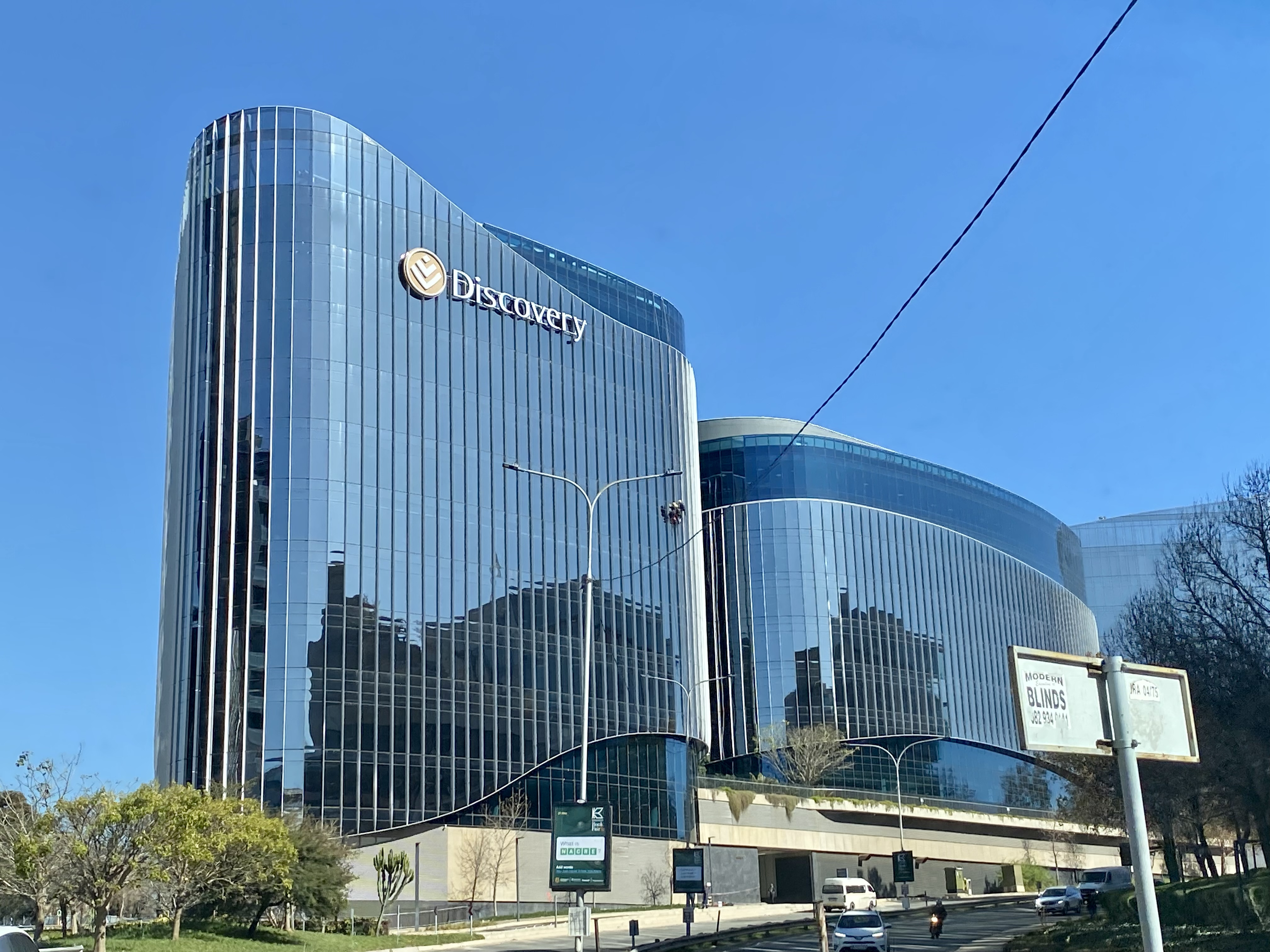
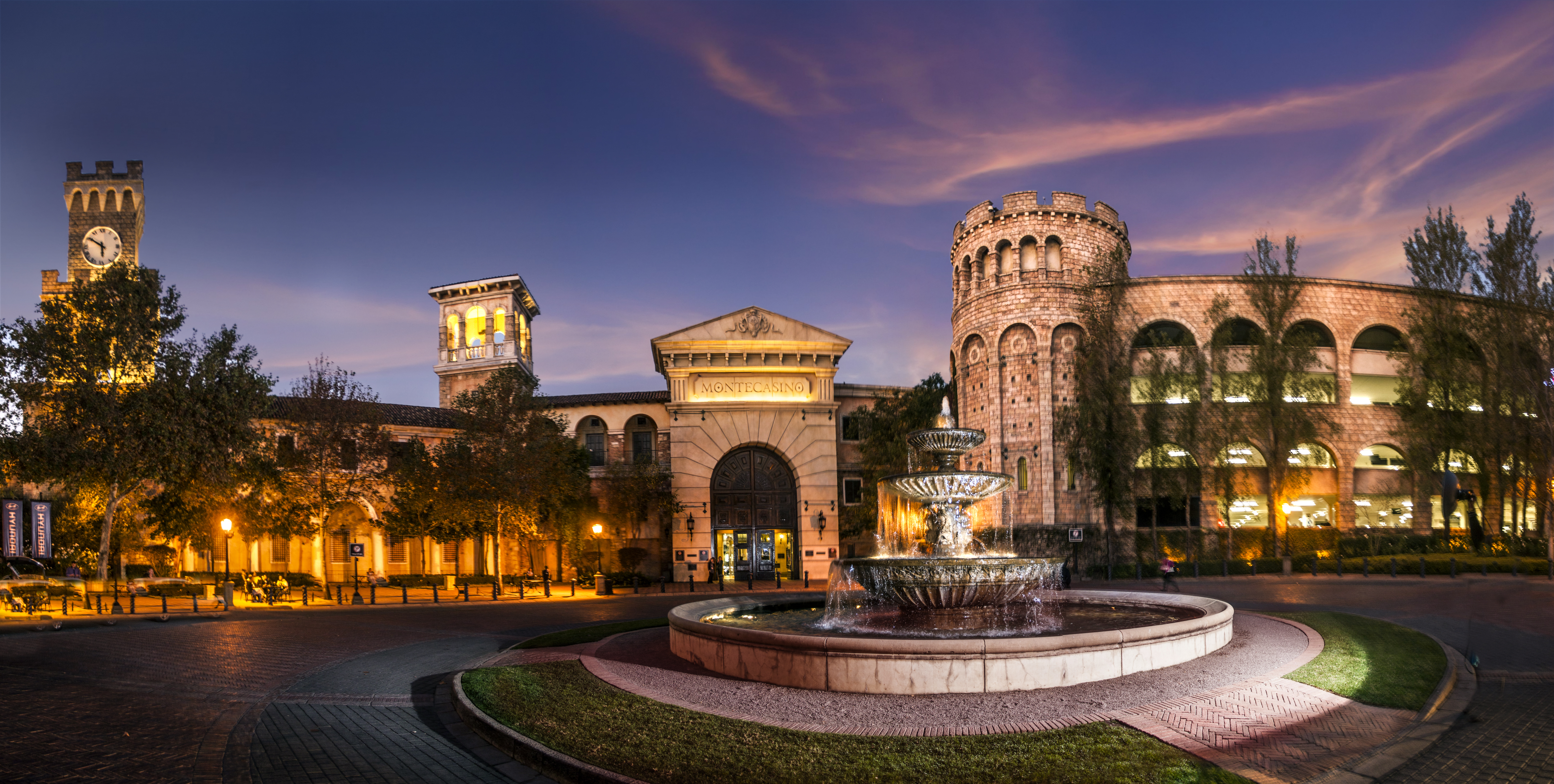
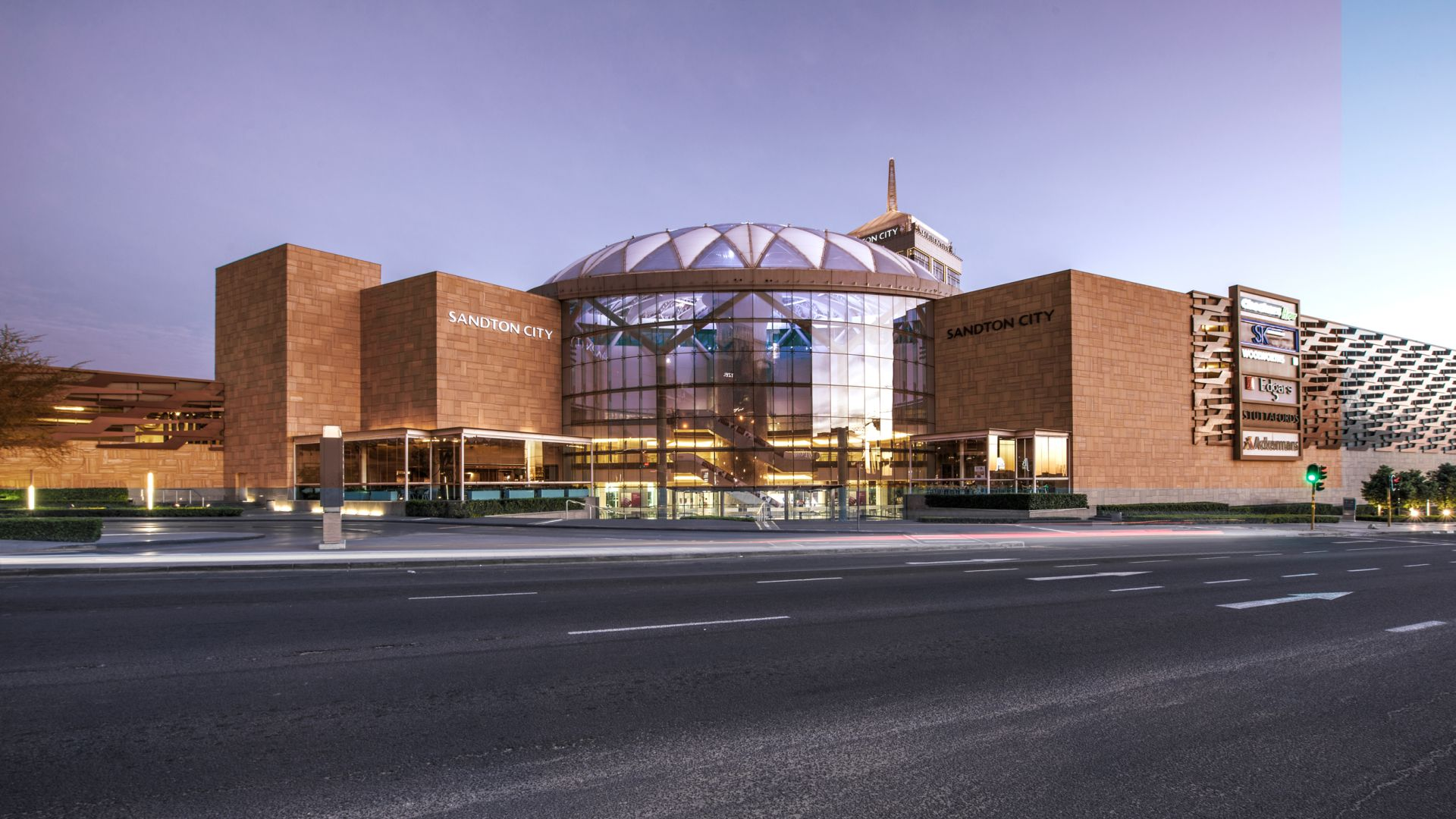
- Sandton skyline Discovery Headquarters Montecasino Sandton City shopping center The Leonardo hotel

- Location within Gauteng Location within South Africa Location within Africa
- Coordinates: 26°6.42′S 28°3.1′E
- Country: South Africa
- Province: Gauteng
- Municipality: City of Johannesburg
- Established: 1906

Area
  - Total: 143.54 km^{2} (55.42 sq mi)

Population (2011)
  - Total: 222,415
  - Density: 1,549.5/km^{2} (4,013.2/sq mi)

Racial makeup (2011)
  - Black African: 34.7%
  - Coloured: 2.5%
  - Indian/Asian: 11.1%
  - White: 49.8%
  - Other: 1.9%

First languages (2011)
  - English: 63.9%
  - Afrikaans: 7.4%
  - Zulu: 6.3%
  - Northern Sotho: 3.2%
  - Other: 19.2%
- Time zone: UTC+2 (SAST)
- Postal code (street): 2196
- PO box: 2146

Sandton is a financial, commercial and residential city, located in the northern part of the City of Johannesburg Metropolitan Municipality. Formerly an independent municipality, Sandton's name came from the combination of two of its suburbs, Sandown and Bryanston.

== History ==
=== Early settlers ===
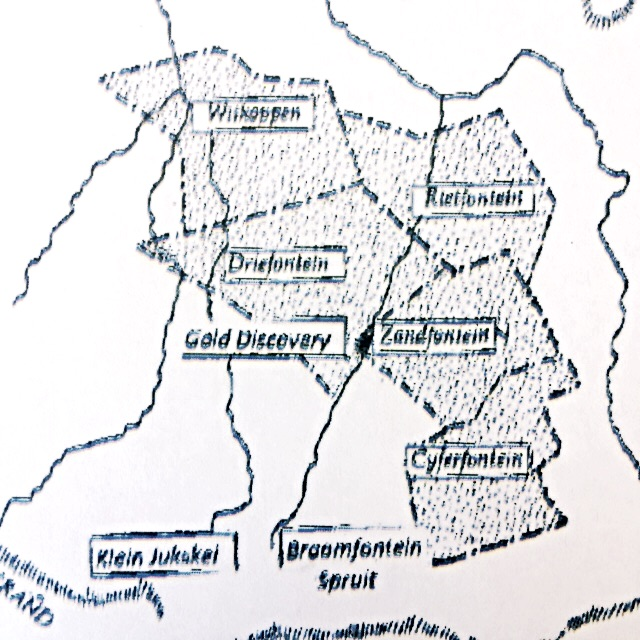
The three original farms, Zandfontein, Driefontein and Rietfontein, and later two additional farms, Witkoppen and Cyferfontein, upon which Sandton was founded.

Archaeological findings suggest the area which Sandton comprises today, had originally been occupied by various indigenous groups, before European settlement, most notably the Tswana and, to a lesser extent, Sotho people. The remains of an Iron Age smelter was discovered in Lone Hill, a suburb of northern Sandton.

One of the first Voortrekker parties to settle in the area were the Esterhuysen family on the farm Zandfontein (Afrikaans and Dutch for Sandy Spring or Sand Fountain). A monument to commemorate them may be found just off Adrienne Street in Sandown where the family cemetery is located. Zandfontein, Driefontein (Afrikaans and Dutch for Three Springs/Fountains) and Rietfontein (Afrikaans and Dutch for Reed Spring or Fountain of Reeds) encumbered what was to become Sandton. The municipal coat of arms of Sandton pays homage to the three farms with three round fountain barrels on its chevron.

In the late 19th century, the Wilhelmi family of Hannover, Germany, acquired the farm Driefontein No. 3 while Rietfontein was owned by the Ehler family. The original Driefontein homestead, now within the confines of the Field & Study Centre, was looted during the Anglo-Boer War. The ruins are visible on the northern bank of the Klein Jukskei River. The Wilhemi family, upon return from Germany, built the 'new' 1906 Driefontein Farmhouse on what is present-day Fifteenth Street, Parkmore cum Riverclub. The farmhouse served as the icon and headquarters for the now defunct Sandton Historical Foundation and is listed as a City of Johannesburg Owned Heritage Site.

=== 1960s and 1970s ===
Initially, it was very much a residential area consisting mostly of small holdings with a rural equestrian lifestyle attracting many of the upper-middle classes and Johannesburg elites. Prior to the 1960s a stream was located at the site of present-day Katherine Street.

From 1944, the area was managed by Transvaal Board for the Development of Peri-Urban Areas (North-Eastern Johannesburg Local Areas). In 1964, the Bryanston, North-Eastern Johannesburg and Sandown Local Areas Committees lobbied for a municipal area separate to Johannesburg municipality that resulted in an investigation by a provincial commission of inquiry. Sandton was established as a separate municipality on 1 July 1969 by the office of the Administrator of the Transvaal.

The Rivonia Trial derives its name from the Liliesleaf Farm precinct situated in the Sandton suburb where many of the Black freedom fighters such as Nelson Mandela were captured by the South African state and subsequently tried for treason. Rivonia had previously been known as Edenburg and was changed to make itself distinct from Edenburg, Free State. It was named for the surname Riven.

Sandton and its constituencies were traditionally relatively more liberal than the surroundings. For example, the motion which never materialised by residents in favour for the inclusion of Alexandra, Gauteng then a demarcated black township in terms of the Group Areas Act, into Sandton's jurisdiction proved troublesome for the National Party government which had a strong constituency in the adjacent town of Randburg.

=== 1980s and 1990s ===
The construction of Sandton City by Rapp & Maister (which was eventually taken over by the Liberty Group which still retains 75% of the complex) marked a significant change for the Sandton area. It created rapid commercialisation and industrialisation. Sandton came to symbolise the White Flight movement of Johannesburg and secured itself as Johannesburg's second Central Business District.

After the demise of apartheid, by 1996, Sandton initially formed part of the interim Eastern Metropolitan Substructure, and in 2000 came to be included, along with the former towns of Randburg and Roodepoort, as part of the newly demarcated City of Johannesburg Metropolitan Municipality thus losing its separate municipal government and town status. Despite this, Sandton is still unofficially regarded as a distinct region of the city and operates as a macro-suburb.

== Role in 21st century Johannesburg ==
=== Financial and business centre ===
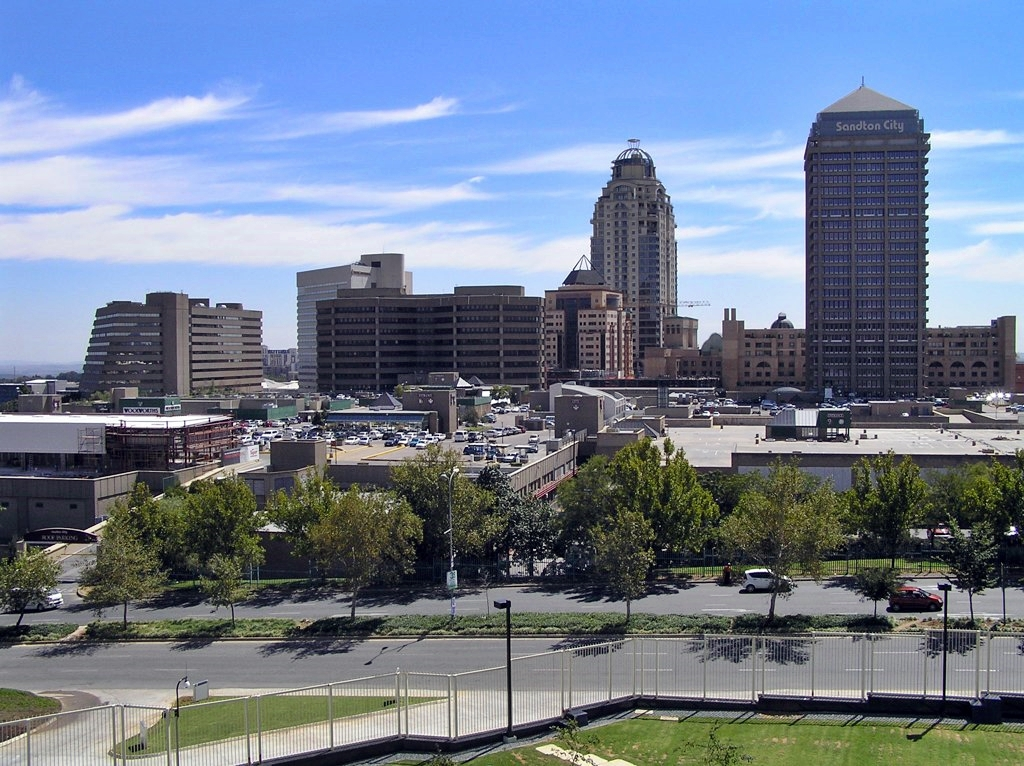
Sandton City Mall, located in Sandton CBD

Urban decay in downtown Johannesburg caused many corporate offices to move from the Johannesburg CBD to Sandton in the 1990s. It has become the new financial district of South Africa and Johannesburg's premier business centre. Much of the financial focus of Johannesburg has shifted from the Central Business District to Sandton.

However, three of South Africa's four largest banks have kept their head offices in downtown Johannesburg. The other bank, Nedbank, has its headquarters in Sandton. A considerable amount of the city's A-grade office space is to be found in Sandton. The JSE Securities Exchange, Johannesburg's stock exchange, relocated its offices to Sandton from the central business district in the late 1990s.

Sandton is home to the Sandton Convention Centre, one of the largest convention centres on the continent and primary site of the 2002 World Summit on Sustainable Development (also known as "Rio + 10"), which Johannesburg hosted. The convention centre also hosted the African National Congress' victory celebrations after the party was re-elected at the 2004 election.

When it comes to green buildings in Africa, Sandton is an epicentre. One of the highest rated green buildings in South Africa – rated by Green Building Council South Africa (GBCSA) – is Upper Grayston Office Park, located in Sandton.

=== Tourism and retail hub ===
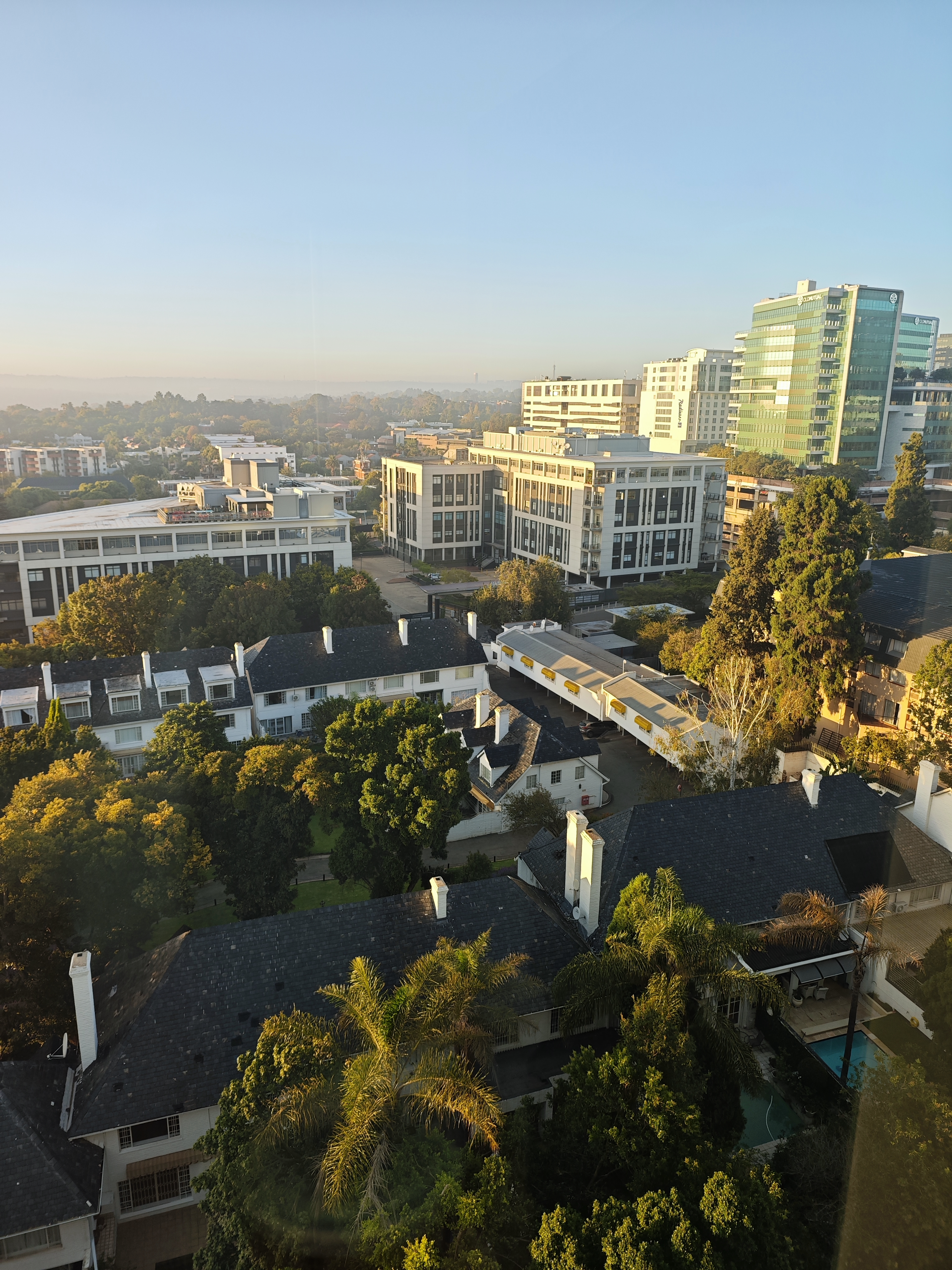
Sunrise over Sandton, Johannesburg.

One of the main attractions in Sandton is Sandton City, which ranks among the largest shopping centres in Africa. The completion of this precinct by the Liberty Group was the catalyst for the subsequent development of this entire area. Together with Nelson Mandela Square, the centre, with some 144,000 m^{2} of shopping space, is one of the largest in the Southern Hemisphere. Much of Johannesburg's business tourism is centred on Sandton, which has various 5-star hotels under the Southern Sun, Hilton, Radisson and Protea brands. The Hilton Sandton on Rivonia Road, opened in 1997, operated under the Hilton brand until June 2024 and has since been managed by Minor Hotels as NH Sandton.

Liberty Group announced in 2008 that Sandton City will receive a R 1.77-billion upgrade. Nelson Mandela Square, formerly known as Sandton Square, was renamed in March 2004, after the unveiling of a 6-metre bronze statue of the former South African president. Liliesleaf Farm, where Nelson Mandela lived in the early 1960s and where many leading political activists were arrested in 1963 and tried as part of the now infamous Rivonia Trial, is just north of Nelson Mandela Square, close to the N1 Highway, off Rivonia Road. Discovery Holdings has, in 2018, completed a large new head office along with shopping mall in the area.

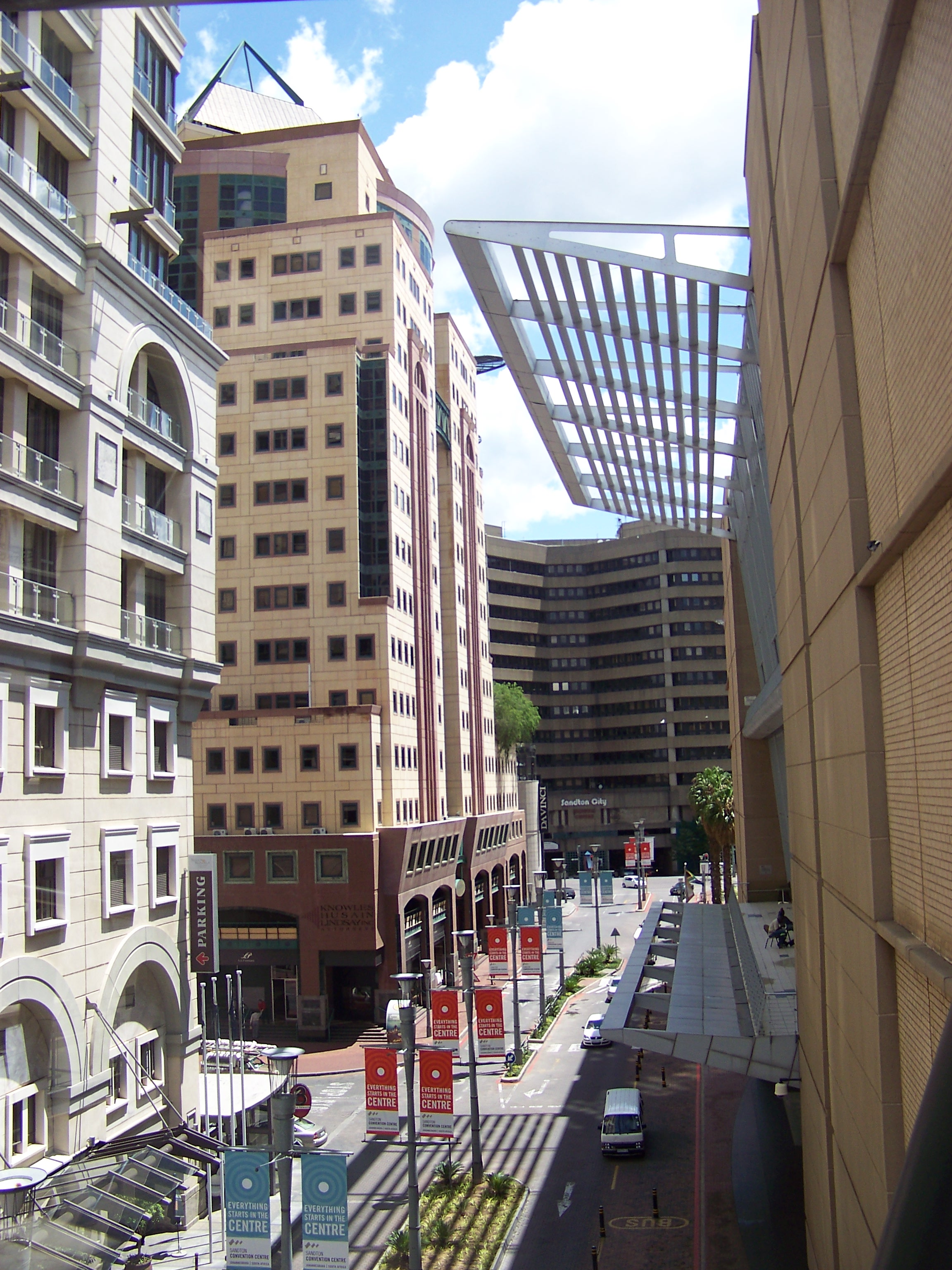
Maude Street adjacent to Sandton Convention Centre

A 55-floor mixed use building, The Leonardo, became the tallest building in all of Africa at the time 234 metres (768 ft) following its completion in 2018, but that distinction has since been claimed by other taller buildings.

== Sandton Central Management District ==
The central business area of Sandton is divided into three City Improvement Districts, which have a unified identity called the Sandton Central Management District, branded as Sandton Central. This district is responsible, using additional funds levied on its behalf by the municipality, for the provision of additional services. The Sandton Central Management district provides additional cleaning, law enforcement, beautification and planning services to the area it services.

== Geography ==
Sandton is located approximately 16 kilometres north of the Johannesburg CBD, bordered by Midrand to the north, Johannesburg to the south, Randburg to the west and Alexandra to the east.

== Transport ==
=== Gautrain ===
Sandton houses the flagship station of the Gautrain rapid rail link. The station is located on the corner of West Street and Rivonia Road. The system has direct connections to OR Tambo International Airport and an inter-city commuter service from Pretoria through Rosebank to Johannesburg Park Station. Sandton's associated Gaubus network comprises direct routes to Fourways, Gallo Manor, Randburg and Rivonia. People can also connect busses and travel to many parts of Centurion, Marlboro, Parktown, Rosebank and Pretoria using the service.

=== Roads ===
The main freeway to get in to the city is the M1 freeway (from Johannesburg and the N1) through the M60 at Marlboro Drive, the M40 at Grayston Drive and the M30 at Corlett Drive. The N1 freeway (Western Bypass) passes through the northern part of Sandton, with off-ramps at the M9 (Rivonia Road) & R511/M81 (Winnie Mandela Drive). One can use the M9, M27, M71, M75 and M85 metropolitan routes.

== Education ==
The main campus of the Lycée Jules Verne, a French international school, is in Sandton. Sandton used to be home of the former Bond University South Africa. Sandton also houses many primary to high schools including:

- Brescia House School
- Bryandale Primary School
- Bryanston High School
- Bryanston Primary School
- Bryneven Primary School
- Buccleuch Primary School
- Crawford College, Sandton
- Grayston Preparatory School
- Hyde Park High School
- King David School Sandton
- Montrose Primary School
- Redhill School
- Rivonia Primary School
- Sandown High School
- Sandton Junior School
- Sandton Primary School
- St David's Marist, Inanda
- St. Peters College
- St Stithians College
- Wendywood Primary School
- Wendywood High School
- Amedeo College
- Qurtuba Islamic Academy

== Notable people ==
- Sir Donald Gordon
- Jani Allan
- Leka, Crown Prince of Albania
- Daniella Pellegrini
- Sibs Shongwe-La Mer
- Amor Vittone, singer

== See also ==
- Shrine of Our Lady of the Cedars
