= Bryanston, Gauteng =

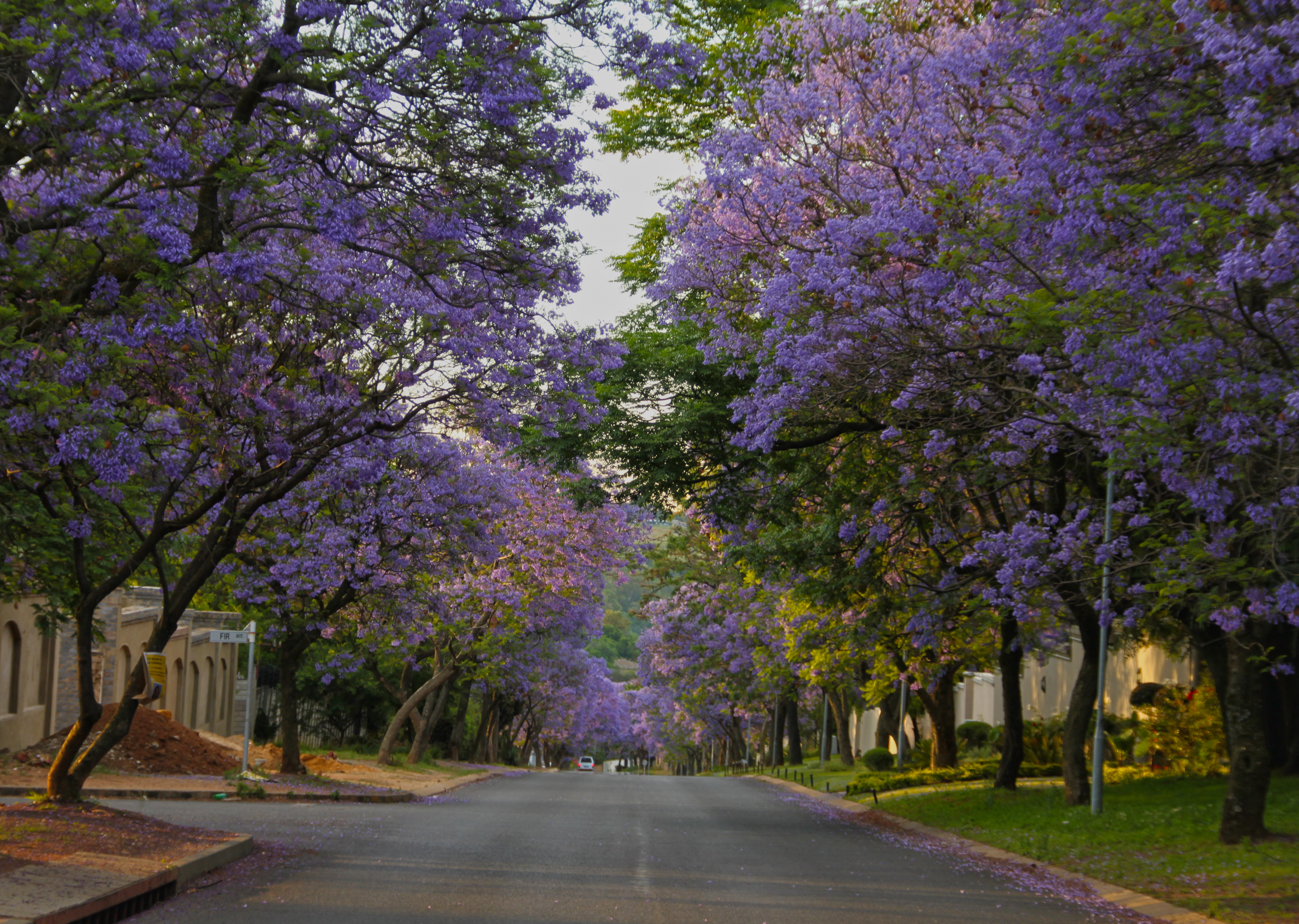
- Street lined with Jacarandas in Bryanston

- Location within Gauteng Location within South Africa
- Coordinates: 26°2′55″S 28°2′2″E
- Country: South Africa
- Province: Gauteng
- Municipality: City of Johannesburg
- Main Place: Sandton

Area
  - Total: 24.90 km^{2} (9.61 sq mi)

Population (2011)
  - Total: 28,758
  - Density: 1,155/km^{2} (2,991/sq mi)

Racial makeup (2011)
  - Black African: 30.4%
  - Coloured: 2.2%
  - Indian/Asian: 5.0%
  - White: 60.8%
  - Other: 1.7%

First languages (2011)
  - English: 68.0%
  - Afrikaans: 8.9%
  - Zulu: 5.4%
  - Tswana: 2.7%
  - Other: 15.0%
- Time zone: UTC+2 (SAST)
- Area code: 010 / 011

Bryanston is an affluent, predominantly residential suburb of Sandton, South Africa. First named as an area in 1949, it was established as a suburb of Sandton in 1969, and provided with tarred roads and municipal services.

The multi-lane N1 (Johannesburg Western Bypass) freeway forms the suburb's northern boundary with access at the R511/M81 (Winnie Mandela Drive) off-ramp. It is located in Region E of the City of Johannesburg Metropolitan Municipality.

== Hospital ==
Mediclinic Sandton, based in Bryanston, is one of the largest hospitals in the province of Gauteng.

== Housing ==
Average houses in Bryanston used to be fairly large, with gardens that contained many trees. However, over the past decades, many larger properties have been converted into gated communities, featuring multiple houses with small gardens. This shift is likely caused by a combination of security reasons, an ever-increasing lack of residential space (due to the popularity of the suburb), and high property taxes in the area.

Bryanston is likely named after a village in the United Kingdom, or after Bryanston Square, also in the UK.

== Economy ==
Many large corporations have their offices in Bryanston, such as Dimension Data (DiData), which runs a large corporate campus (The Campus), GlaxoSmithKline, which is also based at The Campus, Facebook, Nestle, Microsoft Corporation, Ogilvy & Mather, Tiger Brands, Ipsos, and Google South Africa.

== Notable residents past and present ==
- Sol Kerzner, K.C.M.G., founder of Sun International
- Jani Allan, columnist
- Roger Ballen, photographer
- Sarah Britten, author
- Charlene Leonora Smith, author
- Kiernan Jarryd Forbes AKA, rapper
- Leka I, Crown Prince of Albania, Exiled Prince of Albania
- Anele Mdoda, South Africa radio and TV personality
- Nick Abendanon, Bath and England rugby player
