= Gauteng Department of Roads and Transport =

Department overview
- Formed: 1994
- Jurisdiction: Government of Gauteng
- Headquarters: 45 Commissioner Street, Johannesburg, 2000
- Annual budget: TBA
- Department executives: Dr I Vadi, MEC; Mr. R. Swartz, HoD; Mr. J. Van Der Merwe, CEO
- Website: www.gov.za/gauteng/gauteng-roads-and-transport

The Gauteng Department of Roads and Transport is a department of the Government of Gauteng. It is responsible for the development of the transport system in the Gauteng province of South Africa, and for constructing and maintaining buildings and other structures for the other departments of the provincial government.

One of their key functions is to develop and maintain all Regional routes and Provincial routes (& some National routes) within the Gauteng province as well as most metropolitan routes in Johannesburg and metropolitan routes in Pretoria.

They are also responsible for passing any transport authority bill or road traffic amendment bill in the province.

The Department's strategic goals are a to maintain an integrated public transport system that provides customer-centric transport services and strategic economic transport infrastructure that stimulates socio-economic growth; in a modern, accountable and development-oriented department.

== See also ==
- Government of Gauteng
- Department of Transport (South Africa)
- Department of Public Works (South Africa)
- SANRAL
- Johannesburg Roads Agency
