= Cameron Mackenzie (politician) =

South African politician (1960–2021)

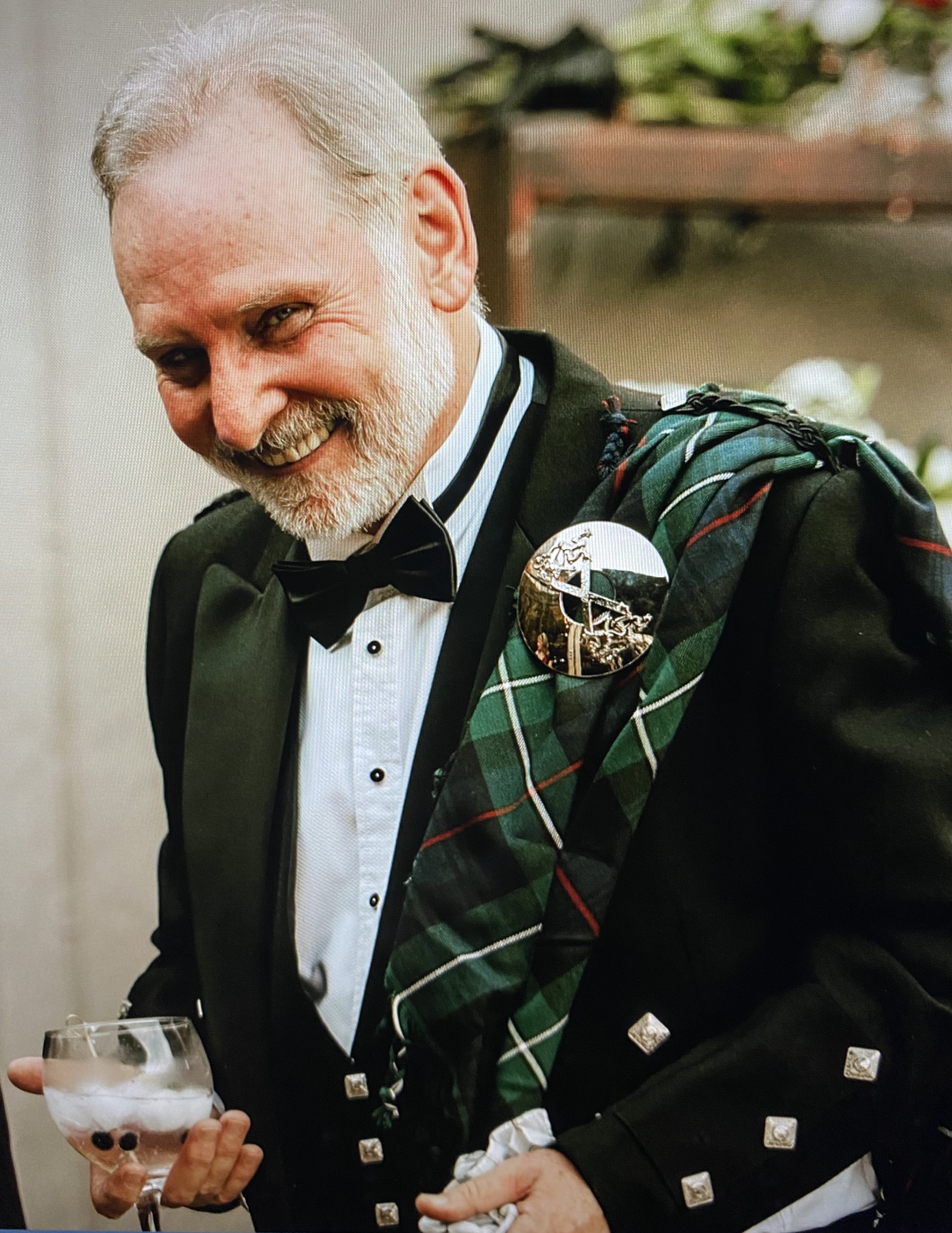

Shadow Deputy Minister of Communications and Digital Technologies
- In office 5 June 2019 – 7 July 2021
- Leader: Mmusi Maimane; John Steenhuisen
- Preceded by: Office established
- Succeeded by: Vacant

Shadow Deputy Minister of Telecommunications and Postal Services
- In office 5 June 2014 – 5 June 2019
- Leader: Mmusi Maimane
- Preceded by: Office established
- Succeeded by: Office abolished

Member of the National Assembly of South Africa
- In office 21 May 2014 – 7 July 2021
- Succeeded by: Ntombi Khumalo

Personal details
- Born: 12 August 1960 Johannesburg, Transvaal Province, Union of South Africa
- Died: 7 July 2021 (aged 60) Fourways, Gauteng, South Africa
- Party: Democratic Alliance (2005–2021)
- Spouse: Lisa (until 2021; his death)
- Children: Emma, Andrea, Thorne

Cameron Mackenzie (12 August 1960 – 7 July 2021) was a South African politician and Member of Parliament in the National Assembly for the Democratic Alliance from 2014 to 2021. Mackenzie was also the Shadow Deputy Minister of Communications and Digital Technologies.

== Early life and education ==
The son of Donald and Jeanne Mackenzie from Inverness, Scotland, Mackenzie was a grade representative on the Students Representative Council (SRC) at his high school. He refused to join the South African Defence Force for mandatory National Service, and left the country instead. He returned in 1990 and got involved in politics, joining the ANC in 1992 after the Boipatong massacre. Mackenzie later left politics in protest following the conclusion of the Arms Deal in 1996. He held a bachelor's degree in Communications Sciences from the University of South Africa, as well as several certificates including Media Freedom and Freedom in Africa from the University of the Witwatersrand. He began his career in financial services, working for Baring Bros Ltd in the UK, ending up as MD of crisis communications and reputation management consultancy, Sentinel 360.

== Political career ==
Prior to the 2006 municipal elections, Mackenzie decided to stand as an independent ward councillor candidate in the City of Johannesburg, thinking that he could engage more constructively with the African National Congress as an independent councillor. He had the perception that the Democratic Alliance was a party for only "wealthy white people". After talking to the local DA councillor, John Mendelsohn, and after a tour of one of Johannesburg's more than 180 informal shack settlements, Mackenzie decided to join the party. He served on his ward's committee from 2006 until he was sworn in as a DA PR councillor in 2009.

In the City of Johannesburg Council, MacKenzie served on the Finance, Economic Development, Transport and MPAC Section 79 committees. He was also appointed to the ad hoc committee on the appointment of an Ombudsman for the city of Johannesburg, where he assisted in drafting the by-law which was later passed into law.

Mackenzie became a parliamentary candidate for the party in the 2014 general elections. He appeared 42nd on the DA's national list thus qualifying for a seat in Parliament as the DA retained its status as official opposition. Soon after, he was appointed by Mmusi Maimane as Shadow Deputy Minister of Telecommunications and Postal Services.

Mackenzie was re-elected to parliament in the 2019 general election and was appointed Shadow Deputy Minister of Communications and Digital Technologies by Maimane. He was reappointed to his shadow cabinet role by the newly elected DA leader, John Steenhuisen, in December 2020.

== Personal life ==
MacKenzie was married to Lisa, and they had two older daughters, Emma and Andrea, and a son, Thorne. On 7 January 2020, Mackenzie was shot during an attempted robbery in Dainfern, Johannesburg. After surgery, MacKenzie had almost fully recovered.

== Death ==
MacKenzie died on 7 July 2021 in Fourways due to COVID-19. He was the 14th known Member of Parliament to have died from the virus.

== See also ==
- List of members of the National Assembly of South Africa who died in office
