= Vittone =

Vittone is an Italian surname. Notable people with the surname include:

- Amor Vittone (born 1972), South African singer
- Bernardo Antonio Vittone (1704–1770), Italian architect and writer
