= Magaliessig =

- Location within Gauteng Location within South Africa
- Coordinates: 26.025°S 28.019°E
- Country: South Africa
- Province: Gauteng
- Municipality: City of Johannesburg
- Main Place: Sandton

Area
  - Total: 2.40 km^{2} (0.93 sq mi)

Population (2011)
  - Total: 5,103
  - Density: 2,130/km^{2} (5,510/sq mi)

Racial makeup (2011)
  - Black African: 21.9%
  - Coloured: 2.1%
  - Indian/Asian: 7.7%
  - White: 66.5%
  - Other: 1.9%

First languages (2011)
  - English: 71.7%
  - Afrikaans: 10.0%
  - Zulu: 3.7%
  - Tswana: 2.3%
  - Other: 12.3%
- Time zone: UTC+2 (SAST)

Magaliessig is a suburb of Sandton, South Africa. It is located in Region E of the City of Johannesburg Metropolitan Municipality and it is part of Bryanston.

It is one of two suburbs, the other being Lone Hill, which piloted a waste recycling scheme initiated by Pikitup, the city's waste utility, and Mama She Waste Recyclers, an NGO, in 2006.
