= Douglasdale =

Douglasdale refers to:

- The valley of the Douglas Water in Lanarkshire, Scotland
- Douglasdale, Gauteng, a residential suburb of Johannesburg, South Africa
- Douglasdale/Douglasglen, Calgary, a neighbourhood of Calgary, Alberta, Canada
