= Fourways =

- Location within Gauteng Location within South Africa Location within Africa
- Coordinates: 26°1′16″S 28°0′33″E
- Country: South Africa
- Province: Gauteng
- Municipality: City of Johannesburg
- Main Place: Sandton

Area
  - Total: 2.13 km^{2} (0.82 sq mi)

Population (2011)
  - Total: 3,860
  - Density: 1,810/km^{2} (4,690/sq mi)

Racial makeup (2011)
  - Black African: 22.1%
  - Coloured: 1.7%
  - Indian/Asian: 4.3%
  - White: 70.4%
  - Other: 1.5%

First languages (2011)
  - English: 73.0%
  - Afrikaans: 7.6%
  - Zulu: 4.4%
  - Northern Sotho: 2.2%
  - Other: 12.7%
- Time zone: UTC+2 (SAST)
- Postal code (street): 2191
- PO box: 2055
- Area code: 011

The area referred to as Fourways (which is a collection of suburbs, including the traditional suburb of Fourways) is the fastest-developing commercial and residential hub in Sandton, north of Johannesburg, South Africa. The main access routes to Fourways are off the N1 at R511 Winnie Mandela Drive, or alternatively along R564 Witkoppen Road. It is located mostly in Region E of the City of Johannesburg Metropolitan Municipality. It is roughly as far as one can go in the Johannesburg Metropolitan area before it dissolves into rolling hills, game farms and the capital Pretoria, 55 kilometres to the northeast. Hartebeespoort Dam and the Magaliesberg Mountains lie half an hour to the north-west. It is bordered by Bryanston to the east and south and Randburg to the west.

The Fourways area is also home to the Fourways Mall which became the largest shopping centre in Africa post an extensive upgrade. Montecasino, which is a leisure and casino complex, is also located in the Fourways district.

== History ==
Long before the district came to be called Fourways, it was a 245-hectare (605-acre) residence and game farm owned by the Eriksen family. The residence they built here in the early 1940s was named Norscot Manor (after their nationalities 'Nor'wegian and 'Scot'tish). The house is in the classic Cape Dutch style, although it is far too large and misshapen to be considered a true Cape Dutch.

After being sold off piece by piece, the stately manor house was given to the City Council of Johannesburg in the 1970s, who named the suburb that was planned around it 'Norscot'. The mansion now serves Fourways as Norscot Manor Recreation Centre, the majority of it being a library, but also encompassing an art gallery, lessons for children in Irish & Highland dancing, Ballet, Biodanza, Indian and Modern dancing as well as Judo and Karate, a playground and a tea garden. There has been much alteration to the manor. It contains Art Deco finishes which abound and remain, such as seashell-inspired window fastenings, and air grates above windows delicately molded of plaster and depicting classic Art Deco ideas: the stag and a sylph-like female form in a forest. In 2015, the Norscot manor house was awarded 'blue plaque' heritage status from the City of Johannesburg, which was unveiled by local Ward Councillor Chris Santana on 18 February 2015.

Fourways was so named because of the four-way stop where William Nicol Drive and Witkoppen Road met. Today William Nicol Drive cuts under Witkoppen Road and is 3 lanes wide. The Fourways name is symbolised with two four-way roundabouts on Kingfisher Drive, the main thoroughfare of the Greater Fourways suburb, intersecting Robin Drive and Alexander Avenue. This suburb also has the original (c. 1905) house the Eriksen lived in before Norscot Manor was built, and it can be found on Flamingo Avenue.

== Geography ==
The Fourways area encompasses several suburbs and estates. The suburbs include Fourways (on the Western side of William Nicol Drive, with a small portion on the Eastern side colloquially known as Little Fourways), Magalies View, Bryanston Ext. 34, several Magaliessig extensions, Norscot, Norscot Slopes, Lone Hill and Beverley, Craigavon, Broadacres. The estates are Cedar Creek, Cedar Lakes, Fourways Gardens, Dainfern, Dainfern Valley, Dainfern Ridge and Fernbrook Estate. The estates have come to be because of the city's high crime rate. Dainfern is centred on a golf course, while Cedar Lakes, Fourways Gardens and Fernbrook Estate are centred on family ideals and parks, Fourways Gardens has a small nature enclosure which used to be home to a set of zebra and several blue cranes. The weather is warmer here than that to the South. Fourways will, on average, enjoy Pretoria's temperatures, owing to their proximity.

Of the koppies located in Greater Johannesburg, Fourways has one located in the Fourways Nature Reserve, named the Norscot Koppies. Lone Hill and Beverley has another, located in the Lonehill Nature Reserve, named the Lonehill Koppie.

Apart from the metropolitan's older and most prestigious suburbs, such as Westcliff in Johannesburg and Sandhurst in Sandton, this area has some of the metro's priciest and most sought-after homes.

Central Fourways comprises the entertainment district. These centres are Design Quarter, just north of Magaliessig, Fourways Mall north of Fourways, Montecasino to the east of Fourways, Fourways Crossing just east of Fourways Mall and the newest development, Cedar Square to the north-west of Fourways Mall. It must be mentioned that Broadacres and Lonehill are served by their own smaller shopping centres. These centres are chic, and are frequented by stay-at-home moms, Broadacres being the particular favourite because of the large park-like grounds it encloses, making it a safe and enjoyable haven for children.

== Business ==
Fourways is widely regarded as a fast-growing economic hub within Johannesburg’s northern suburbs. Its proximity to major roads and affluent residential areas has made it a popular base for both small businesses and large enterprises. The commercial landscape includes a diverse range of sectors, including retail, hospitality, finance, education, property development, and contracting companies.

The area’s economy is anchored by major shopping destinations like Fourways Mall, Montecasino, Design Quarter, and Cedar Square, which host national and international brands, restaurants, tech companies, and lifestyle retailers.

In addition to larger developments, Fourways supports a thriving small business community. Local service providers such as home maintenance companies, electrical contractors, and construction firms contribute to the area’s continued growth.

The area's dynamic property development and infrastructure expansion continue to attract entrepreneurs and professionals seeking accessible commercial premises and high-income residential markets.

== Schools ==
Fourways has several reputable schools. They include the government school Fourways High School in Greater Fourways (grades 8-12), the private Crawford schools: Pre-Primary, and Preparatory in Craigavon (grades 000-7) as well as Crawford Pre-Primary, Preparatory and College in Lonehill (grades 000-12). Dainfern is served by Dainfern College (grades 0-12). Further closer to the Lanseria area is Heronbridge College, a prestigious private school off the R114 Niedgedatcht. Residents of Fourways have a precedent stake in entering their children in Bryanston's elite government primary schools Bryandale Primary School and Bryanston Primary School, because of Fourways' close proximity to Bryanston.

== Trivia ==
There are two urban legends, one that the Lonehill Nature Reserve came to be when alarmed residents heard that an American had bought the topmost rock of the Lonehill Koppie. In a panic they had the surrounding area declared a nature reserve, and the American could no longer remove it. The second was that Afrikaners believed that the English would be driven out of South Africa if the top rock could be dislodged. The reserve is open from September through April on Saturdays and Sundays and is an idyllic place to laze away or exert oneself - both koppies may be climbed, and original rock art can be observed.

== Safety and Security ==
The Douglasdale office of the South African Police Service located in Douglasdale service the majority of the Fourways District and Bryanston area.
