= Ntombi (given name) =

Ntombi is a given name. Notable people with the name include:

- Ntombi Khumalo (fl. 2016), South African politician
- Ntombi Mekgwe (fl. 1987), South African politician
- Ntombi Shope (1950–2003), South African politician
- Ntombi Tfwala (born 1949), Queen Mother of Eswatini
