= Toymaster =

British chain of toy stores

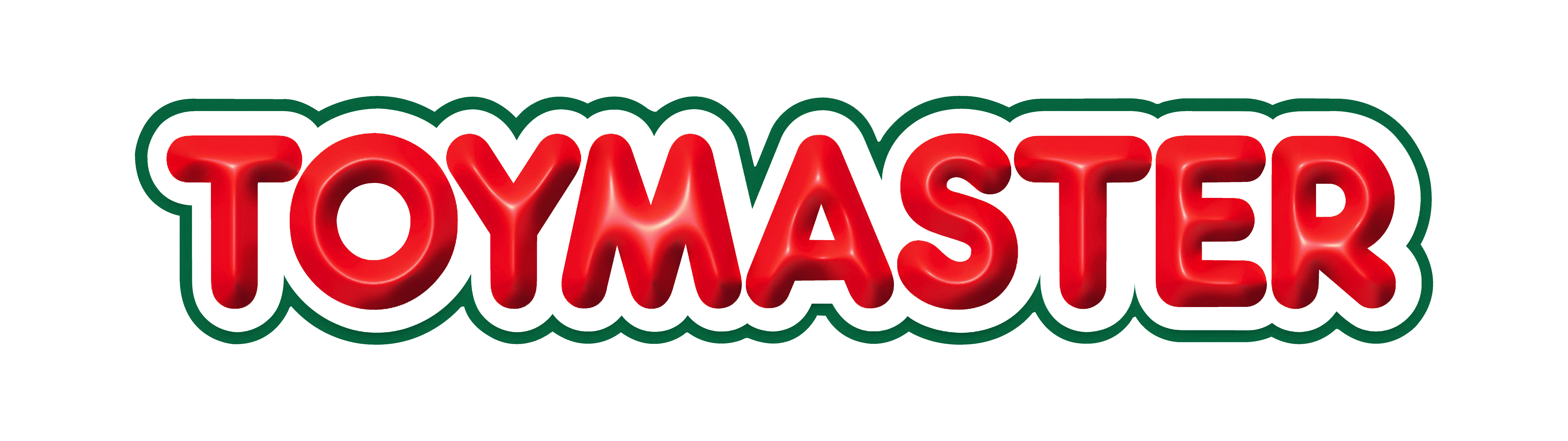

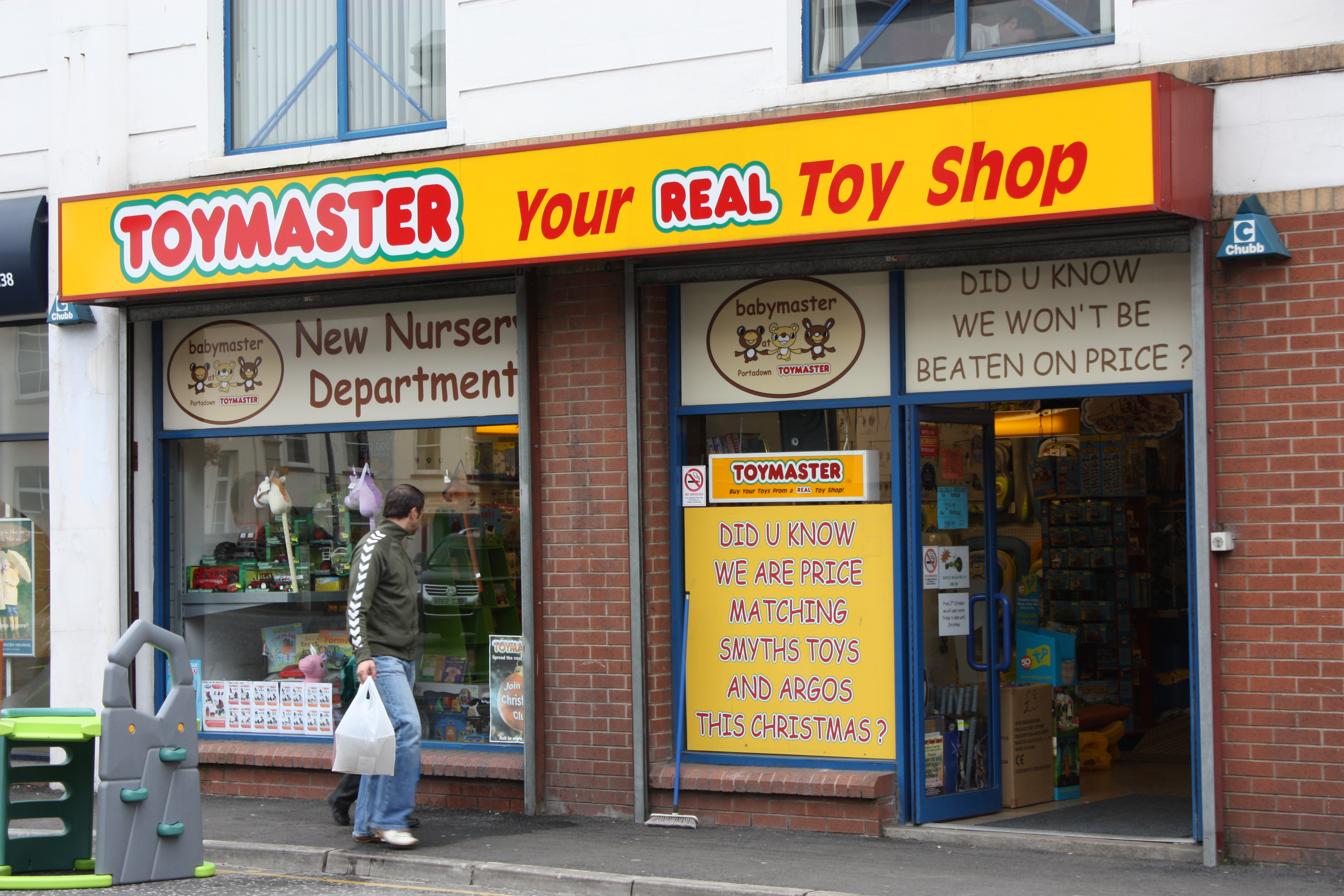
- Toymaster store in Portadown, County Armagh
- Company type: Buying group association of independently owned toy retailers
- Founded: 1977
- Headquarters: Northampton, UK
- Website: toymaster.co.uk

Toymaster is a British buying group association of independently owned toy stores, founded in 1977. Whilst some members brand themselves as Toymaster, others choose to retain their own branding to promote their independence.

Toymaster is famous for its mascot of an orange puppy wearing a yellow T-shirt and trousers. In 2012, the puppy was named Toby. As of June 2021, the association has members spanning the United Kingdom and Ireland, as well as outlets in Jersey, Guernsey and a store in Malta.

== Background ==
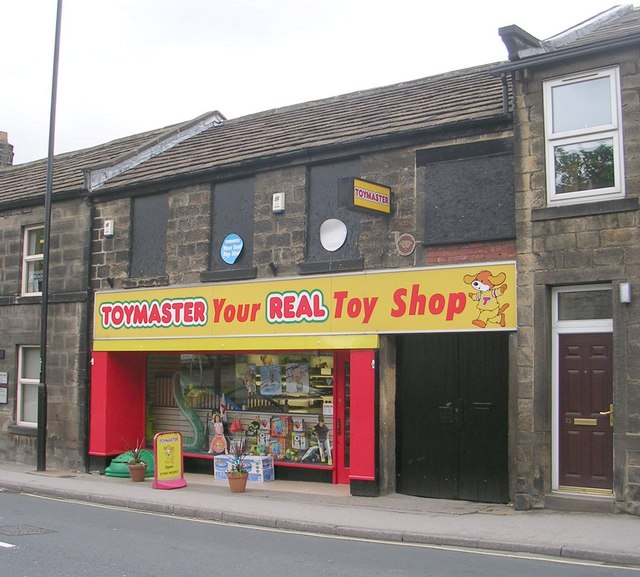
Toymaster in Otley, West Yorkshire.

The member stores comprise a variety of different outlets, including toy stores, garden centres, department stores, post offices and others. Its head office provides central support to its member retailers, mainly finance and marketing, including a year-round window display program to help independent retailers promote key toy brands within their stores. The central office also provides information and support to its member stores to help them trade more profitably.

In 2012, Toby the mascot was given his own Apple iPhone app.

== See also ==
- Smyths
- The Entertainer (retailer)
- Hamleys
