= ToyZone =

British high-street chain

- Company type: Private company
- Industry: Toy industry
- Founded: 1995
- Defunct: 2008
- Products: Toys and games
- Owner: The Entertainer
- Website: toyzone.co.uk

ToyZone was a British high-street chain of stores, predominantly selling toys and novelty items. It was best known for being one of the first online toy retailers, launching their online store in 1998. The company's online efforts were backed by TV presenter Jonathan Ross, Tom Hunter and Matthew Freud.

== History ==
ToyZone was formed in January 1995 by Philip James Goodall and Philip Mark Iain Goodall. The chain originally operated a small network of toy stores.

In 1998, the chain began national recognition due to its online operations, and former director of Toys R Us, Jo Hall, became appointed as the company's head.

The chain was one of the earliest online toy stores, and was battling sales against Toys R Us and eToys. The chain gained backing from Matthew Freud, Tom Hunter and TV presenter Jonathan Ross.

In 2001, the company failed to gain a head over Toys R Us, eToys and Amazon, and closed its online operations, instead partnering with Toymonkey.com. Following its online collapse, the company operated a chain of stores selling liquated and clearance toys, these predominately operating in outlet shopping centres across the United Kingdom.

In 2008, the chain's remaining physical units entered administration and closed. In 2021, The Entertainer registered the ToyZone name.

== See also ==
- Toymaster
- Hamleys
