= 1998 Blue Bulls Currie Cup season =

1998 Currie Cup
- Countries: South Africa
- Champions: Blue Bulls
- Runners-up: Western Province

In 1998 the Blue Bulls rugby union team competed in South Africa's Currie Cup. They won the championship game against Western Province with a score of 24-20.

This was the first season the team used the name Blue Bulls. Previously they were known as the Northern Transvaal Rugby Union.

They were captained by Joost van der Westhuizen, who played scrum-half.

== Blue Bulls results in the 1998 Currie cup ==
1998 Blue Bulls results
| Game № | Blue Bulls points | Opponent points | Opponent | Date | Venue | Currie Cup season | Result | Match notes |
| 1 | 35 | 26 | Eastern Province | 18 July 1998 | Telkom Park, Port Elizabeth | 1998 Currie Cup | Blue Bulls won | |
| 2 | 15 | 18 | Griquas | 25 July 1998 | Absa Park, Kimberly | 1998 Currie Cup | Blue Bulls lost | |
| 3 | 68 | 11 | Leopards | 1 August 1998 | Loftus Versveld, Pretoria | 1998 Currie Cup | Blue Bulls won | |
| 4 | 48 | 3 | Pumas | 7 August 1998 | Loftus Versveld, Pretoria | 1998 Currie Cup | Blue Bulls won | |
| 5 | 32 | 29 | SWD Eagles | 14 August 1998 | Outeniqua Park, George | 1998 Currie Cup | Blue Bulls won | |
| 6 | 27 | 22 | Falcons | 21 August 1998 | Loftus Versveld, Pretoria | 1998 Currie Cup | Blue Bulls won | |
| 7 | 28 | 5 | Griffons | 28 August 1998 | Welkom | 1998 Currie Cup | Blue Bulls won | |
| 8 | 59 | 21 | Border | 5 September 1998 | Loftus Versveld, Pretoria | 1998 Currie Cup | Blue Bulls won | |
| 9 | 20 | 12 | Golden Lions | 12 September 1998 | Ellispark, Johannesburg | 1998 Currie Cup | Blue Bulls won | |
| 10 | 57 | 3 | Boland Cavaliers | 26 September 1998 | Boland | 1998 Currie Cup | Blue Bulls won | |
| 11 | 20 | 38 | Western Province | 3 October 1998 | Loftus Versveld, Pretoria | 1998 Currie Cup | Blue Bulls lost | |
| 12 | 19 | 24 | Natal Sharks | 10 October 1998 | Durban | 1998 Currie Cup | Blue Bulls lost | |
| 13 | 33 | 19 | Free State | 17 October 1998 | Loftus Versveld, Pretoria | 1998 Currie Cup | Blue Bulls won | |
| 14 | 31 | 17 | Natal Sharks | 24 October 1998 | Loftus Versveld, Pretoria | 1998 Currie Cup | Blue Bulls won | Semi-Final |
| 15 | 24 | 20 | Western Province | 31 October 1998 | Loftus Versveld, Pretoria | 1998 Currie Cup | Blue Bulls won | Final |

== Statistics ==
=== 1998 Currie cup log position ===
1998 Currie Cup Log
| | Team | Played | Won | Drawn | Lost | Points For | Points Against | Points Difference | Tries For | Tries Against | Bonus Points | Points |
| 2nd | Blue Bulls | 13 | 10 | 0 | 3 | 461 | 231 | +230 | 65 | 28 | 9 | 49 |

=== 1988 - 1998 results summary (including play off matches) ===
| Period | Games | Won | Drawn | Lost | Win % | Points for | Average PF | Points against | 40-49 pts | 50-99 pts | 100+ pts | Best score | Worst score against |
|---|---|---|---|---|---|---|---|---|---|---|---|---|---|
| 1988–1998 | 138 | 98 | 3 | 37 | 71.01% | 4310 | 31.23 | 2735 | 11 | 17 | 1 | 147-8 SWD Eagles (4 October 1996) | 57-13 vs Transvaal (1994) |
