= Dainfern =

- Location within Gauteng Location within South Africa
- Coordinates: 25°58′58″S 27°59′53″E
- Country: South Africa
- Province: Gauteng
- Municipality: City of Johannesburg

Area
  - Total: 4.08 km^{2} (1.58 sq mi)

Population (2011)
  - Total: 6,601
  - Density: 1,620/km^{2} (4,190/sq mi)

Racial makeup (2011)
  - Black African: 25.8%
  - Coloured: 1.7%
  - Indian/Asian: 7.7%
  - White: 61.0%
  - Other: 3.8%

First languages (2011)
  - English: 65.0%
  - Afrikaans: 5.0%
  - Zulu: 4.1%
  - Northern Sotho: 2.2%
  - Other: 23.7%
- Time zone: UTC+2 (SAST)
- Postal code (street): 2191
- PO box: 2055

Dainfern is a golfing estate in Greater Johannesburg, South Africa. Established in 1985, it is the first gated golf estate in South Africa, located in Region A of the City of Johannesburg Metropolitan Municipality.

The estate's 320-acres suburb contains 1,200 houses and is sub-divided into several "villages". Among these are Sherwood, Hampstead, Highgate, Montagu and Riverwood. Dainfern Ridge and Dainfern Valley are smaller urban areas near Dainfern.

== History ==
In 1985, Johnnic Properties acquired the estate which included the old Fourways Golf Course. In 1986, JCI purchased the company Dainfern Investments (Pty) Ltd and applied for a township to be known as "Dainfern" to be developed on the outskirts of Fourways. The Dainfern Homeowners Association (DHA) was registered as a Section 21 Company in 1991 to ensure efficient management and upkeep of the estate. Dainfern Township was officially proclaimed in 1992, complete with a new golf course designed by professional South African golfer, Gary Player. On 31 August 2000, Johnnic officially transferred the estate's management to the DHA, which it remains under today. The Estate is governed by a comprehensive Memorandum of Incorporation and Estate Rules, which prioritize the rights and interests of homeowners and residents. 2022 marked the 30 year anniversary of Dainfern Golf Estate and was commemorated by unveiling the Gary Player Tribute.

== Facilities ==
Dainfern has an eighteen-hole golf course surrounding the estate; the course has tarred pathways to enable golf carts to access the course. The course was designed by the professional golfer Gary Player.

Ammennities include; a central clubhouse containing a family restaurant, The Grill Room, Members' Longue, Halfway House and conference facilities; two swimming pools; tennis courts; a volleyball court; squash courts; hiking trails and play parks. Security measures include 24/7 patrols, CCTV and access control.

Dainfern publishes "In Focus", a monthly magazine exclusive to the estate.

== Awards ==
- Best Golf Course in Johannesburg, 2023 - Best of Joburg
- No. 53 golf course in South Africa and No. 18 in Gauteng - Top 100 Golf Courses
- Nominated for Africa's Best Golf Real Estate Venue, 2024 - World Golf Awards

== Notable residents ==
- Amor Vittone – musician
- Joost van der Westhuizen – Springbok rugby player (d. 2017)
- Lebo M – composer
- Robert Marawa – sports anchor
