= Gamleys =

British toy store chain

- Founded: 1919
- Defunct: 2008
- Owner: The Entertainer
- Website: gamleys.co.uk

Gamleys was a chain of toy shops mainly located in the south of the United Kingdom with a head office in Hove, near Brighton. The company was founded in 1919. Unlike many of its rivals such as Toys "R" Us, Gamleys operated smaller shops in high streets and shopping centres rather than larger super stores. Because of this different approach to business it had managed to survive, unlike the former Children's World. The name Gamleys was thought up by the original proprietor, Bill Lord, who wanted to mix the names of the two most famous London stores, Gamages and Hamleys.

In late 2007 and through the first half of 2008, a number of Gamleys stores closed down and in August 2008 rival chain The Entertainer, operator of thetoyshop.com website, purchased the Maidstone and Brighton stores, leaving only the Bromley store which closed in September 2008. After almost 90 years of trading, Gamleys went out of business in 2008.

== Legacy ==
The Entertainer currently owns the Gamleys trademark, and purchased it from Gamleys Limited in 2008.
