= Hamleys =

British multinational toy retailer

Coordinates: 51.5128°N 0.1402°W

Hamleys of London Limited
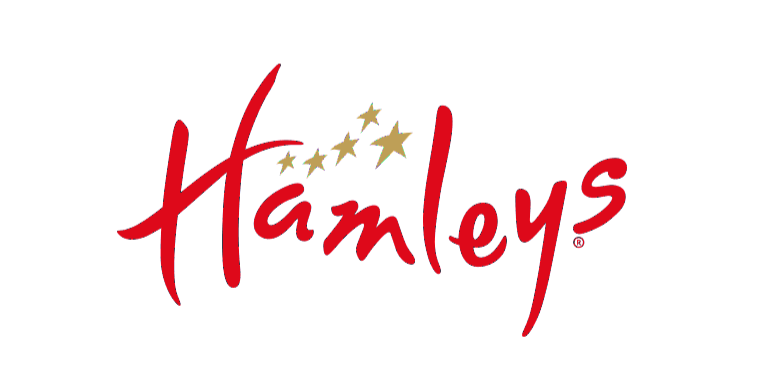
- Official logo of Hamleys

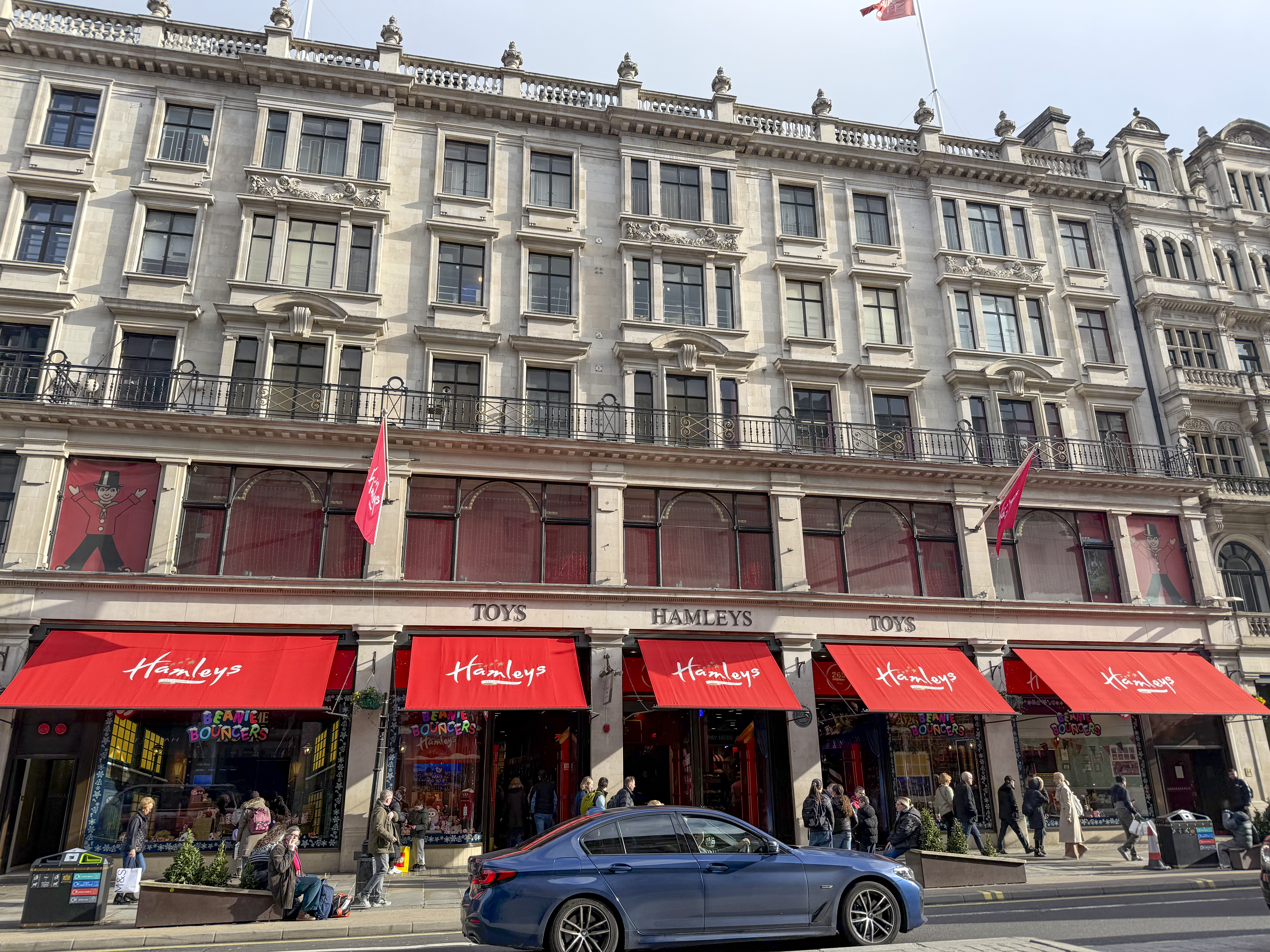
- Hamleys flagship store on Regent Street in 2026
- Formerly: Hamleys Limited (1988–1994)
- Type: Subsidiary
- Industry: Retail
- Founded: 1760; 266 years ago
- Founder: William Hamley
- Headquarters: London, England, UK
- Number of locations: 11 in UK; 90 international franchises
- Area served: Worldwide (previously in Russia until 2022)
- Products: Toys; Games; Dolls
- Revenue: £5.5 million (2017)
- Owner: Reliance Retail
- Website: hamleys.com

Hamleys of London Limited, trading as Hamleys, is a British multinational toy retailer, owned by Reliance Retail. Listed in the Guinness Book of Records as the world's oldest toy store, it was founded by William Hamley as "Noah's Ark" in High Holborn, London, in 1760. It moved to its current site on Regent Street in London's West End in 1981. This flagship store is set over seven floors, with more than 50,000 lines of toys on sale. It receives around five million visitors each year, and is especially busy at Christmas.

The chain has 11 outlets in the United Kingdom and also has more than 90 franchises worldwide. Hamleys became famous in the early Victorian era, with royalty among its customers. The store was granted its first royal warrant from Queen Mary in 1938. It held a Royal Warrant from Elizabeth II from 1955 to 2022 (her death).

== History ==
Hamleys was the largest toy shop in the world in 1994. It also claims to be the oldest Toyshop in the world, but is about 75 years younger than "Carl Loebner Spielwaren" in Torgau, Germany (Founded 1685). It is named after William Hamley, who founded a toy shop called "Noah's Ark" at No. 231 High Holborn, London, in 1760. Ownership of the shop passed through the family, and by the time it was operated by Hamley's grandsons in 1837, the store had become famous, counting royalty and nobility among its customers.

A branch at 200 Regent Street in the West End of London was opened in 1881. The original High Holborn store was destroyed by fire in 1901 and subsequently relocated to 86–87 High Holborn.

Hamleys suffered a downturn through the 1920s and closed, entering receivership, in 1931. After ensuring that it would not alienate their suppliers, the Lines Bros toy company, Hamleys' largest creditor, purchased the company and reopened the Regent Street store by the end of that year, keeping it largely independent. The High Holborn branch, opened in 1901, would not reopen under the new ownership.

In 1938, Queen Mary, consort of King George V, gave Hamleys a royal warrant. During the Second World War, the Regent Street store was bombed five times. In 1955, Queen Elizabeth II gave the company a second royal warrant as a "toys and sports merchant".

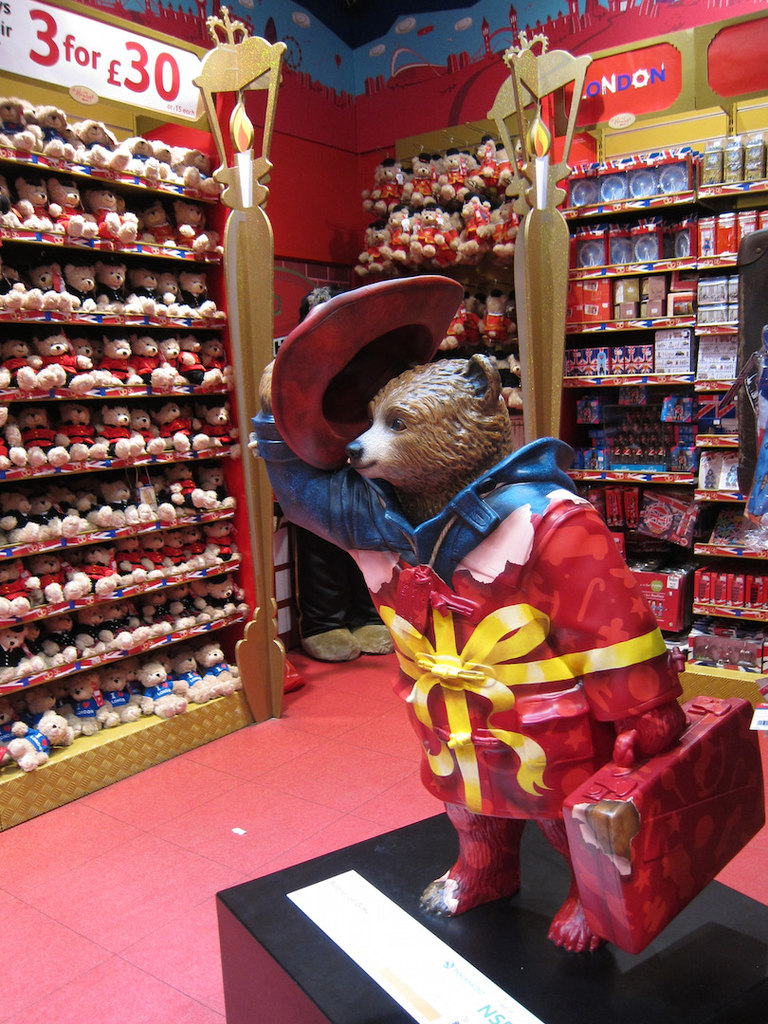
Statue of Paddington Bear in Hamleys (who bought the rights to the character) in London which was auctioned for the National Society for the Prevention of Cruelty to Children (NSPCC)

Hamleys was purchased by the department store chain Debenhams in 1976, and in 1981, Hamleys would move to 188–196 Regent Street, built c.1905, which at that time was occupied by Waring & Gillow, had previously been the London branch of Galeries Lafayette between 1921 and 1972, and previousy Messrs. Swears and Wells. The new Hamleys Regent Street store was, at the time, listed in the Guinness Book of Records as the largest toy shop in the world.

Debenhams was the subject of a takeover in August 1985 by the Burton Group. Burton Group divested Hamleys in August 1986 to Harris Queensway, a retail group led by Philip Harris. At the time it was said that a strategic plan had been formulated to build on the strength of the brand to ensure the company lived up to its reputation. The Harris Queensway group, including Hamleys, was taken over in 1988 by a James Gulliver-led company to become Lowdnes Queensway.

In 1988, sports retailer; Lillywhites, then owned by Trusthouse Forte, opened a concession on the lower ground floor of Hamleys' Regent Street store. This appears to have closed by the end of 1989.

Hamleys was sold by Lowndes Queensway in May 1989 to a group led by Duncan Chadwick for £22 million.

Hamleys was bought in June 2003 by the Baugur Group, an Icelandic investment company. When Baugur went into administration in early 2009, the company was taken over by the Icelandic bank Landsbanki. In September 2012, Groupe Ludendo, a toy retailer based in France with shops also located in Belgium, Spain and Switzerland, bought Hamleys for a reported £60 million.

In October 2015 it was reported that Groupe Ludendo was negotiating the sale of Hamleys, possibly to a Hong Kong company owned by a relative of the owner of department store House of Fraser. It was subsequently purchased by C.Banner, a large Chinese footwear and fashion wear conglomerate based in Nanjing.

In May 2019, Indian retail company, Reliance Retail, part of the Reliance Industries, announced that it has acquired Hamleys for £67.96 million (around ₹6.2 billion) using international bank receipt.

== United Kingdom stores ==
=== Regent Street ===
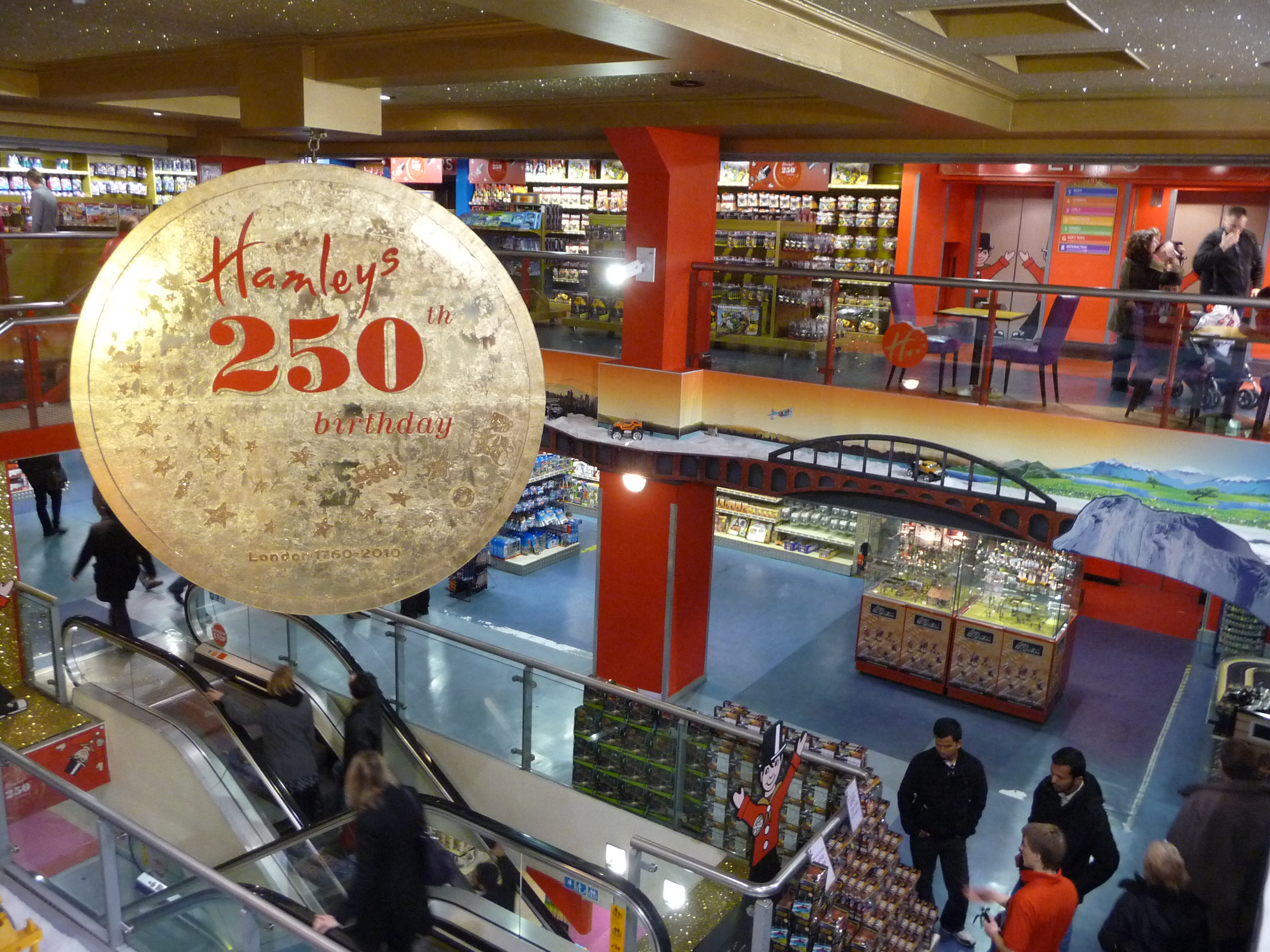
Regent Street shop interior in 2010, marking Hamleys' 250th birthday

Hamleys expanded and moved its flagship store in London from No. 200 Regent Street to its current site at Nos. 188–196, Regent Street, in 1981, which in 1994 was the largest toy shop in the world.

Hamleys' flagship store has seven floors covering 54,000 square feet (5,000 m^{2}), all devoted to toys, with different categories of toy on each floor. The ground floor is traditionally for stuffed toys (including Steiff), and is decked out with a diverse array of stuffed animals, from regular teddy bears to more exotic plushes such as turtles and dolphins, and enormous life-sized giraffes and elephants. Public transit is available via the Oxford Circus underground station.

The final scene of the 1999 film Eyes Wide Shut was filmed in the store.

=== Other UK stores ===
At the start of January 2022, there were 30 Hamleys stores across the United Kingdom, including sites at the St Enoch Centre in Glasgow, at the Trafford Centre in Greater Manchester, at Lakeside Shopping Centre in Essex, Bluewater Shopping Centre in Kent, St James Quarter in Edinburgh, St David's Centre in Cardiff, the Merry Hill Centre in the West Midlands, York, and at airports including London Heathrow, London Gatwick, London Luton and London Stansted, and also at Meadowhall Shopping Centre in Sheffield, Liverpool ONE, Cheshire Oaks Outlet, Gateshead Metrocentre and Manchester.

However, by December 2023 Hamleys had closed all but 11 of their stores in the United Kingdom.

==== Bath ====
Hamleys first store outside of Regent Street was announced in August 1985. The company was to occupy a 20,000 sq ft shop in Milsom Street, in the city of Bath, Somerset, previously occupied by Brown Bear Furniture, and leased from Bath City Council. Much was written in the local press at the time about the potential rivalry between Hamleys and the locally owned toy chain of Eric Snook. A store in Bristol had been considered as an alternative, but no suitable premises could be found.

The Bath store opened on Saturday 13 October 1984, after a preview opening the previous day. The opening of the £250,000 shop saw a crowd of around 2,500 people gather, leading to Milsom Street being closed to traffic to avoid injury. A large parade was organised including Toytown characters and the Frome Town Majorettes.

Despite the Bath store being reported as successful, by 1988 the other provincial stores were trading with disappointing results and this, coupled with an "outstanding offer" for the lease from Waterstones, meant that in June of that year Hamleys announced the closure of the Bath store. Hamleys closed in July 1988.

Waterstones transferred their main store from their nearby premises in Milson Street into the ex-Hamleys shop in October 1988, where they remain (as of 2026). The former Waterstones premises became the first branch of Young Waterstones.

==== Birmingham ====
On 12 November 1985, Hamleys opened a store on Bull Street in Birmingham with a sales area of 30,000 sq ft. The building had originally been the flagship of the Edward Grey chain, which Debenhams had bought in 1958 and rebranded as Debenhams in March 1973. The Debenhams branch was then closed in January 1983, at a similar time to Birmingham's-then largest toy shop; Barnby's. The Hamleys opening day was so popular, that the rush of more than 5,000 children and parents saw the doors temporarily closed at one stage to avoid a crush.

The Hamleys store occupied three floors of the Bull Street building and was once the second largest toy shop in the world, though by 1988 was only operating from 12,000 sq ft on one floor, down from 24,000 sq ft on two floors before Christmas 1987, as a result of a sales battle with the nearby Toys 'R' Us store in Dale End which opened in October 1986. The Bull Street site was due to be redeveloped, although Hamleys announced they had no plans to relocate, and eventually announced their closure, which took place in May 1988.

The former Hamleys building was subsequently demolished and the site is now occupied by Colmore Gate.

==== Croydon ====
Hamleys opened a store at 23 George Street, Croydon in 1985. This had closed by May 1988.

==== Newcastle Upon Tyne ====
In October 1987 Hamleys opened a new store in one of the richest shopping streets in the United Kingdom, Northumberland Street, Newcastle upon Tyne. Surprisingly, it operated for only 12 months, and closed in October 1988. It had seemed a "perfect combination" (Hamleys and Northumberland Street), but it did not work out.

==== York ====
In 1987 Hamleys' opened a store in York. However, it closed less than 12 months later.

== Global stores ==
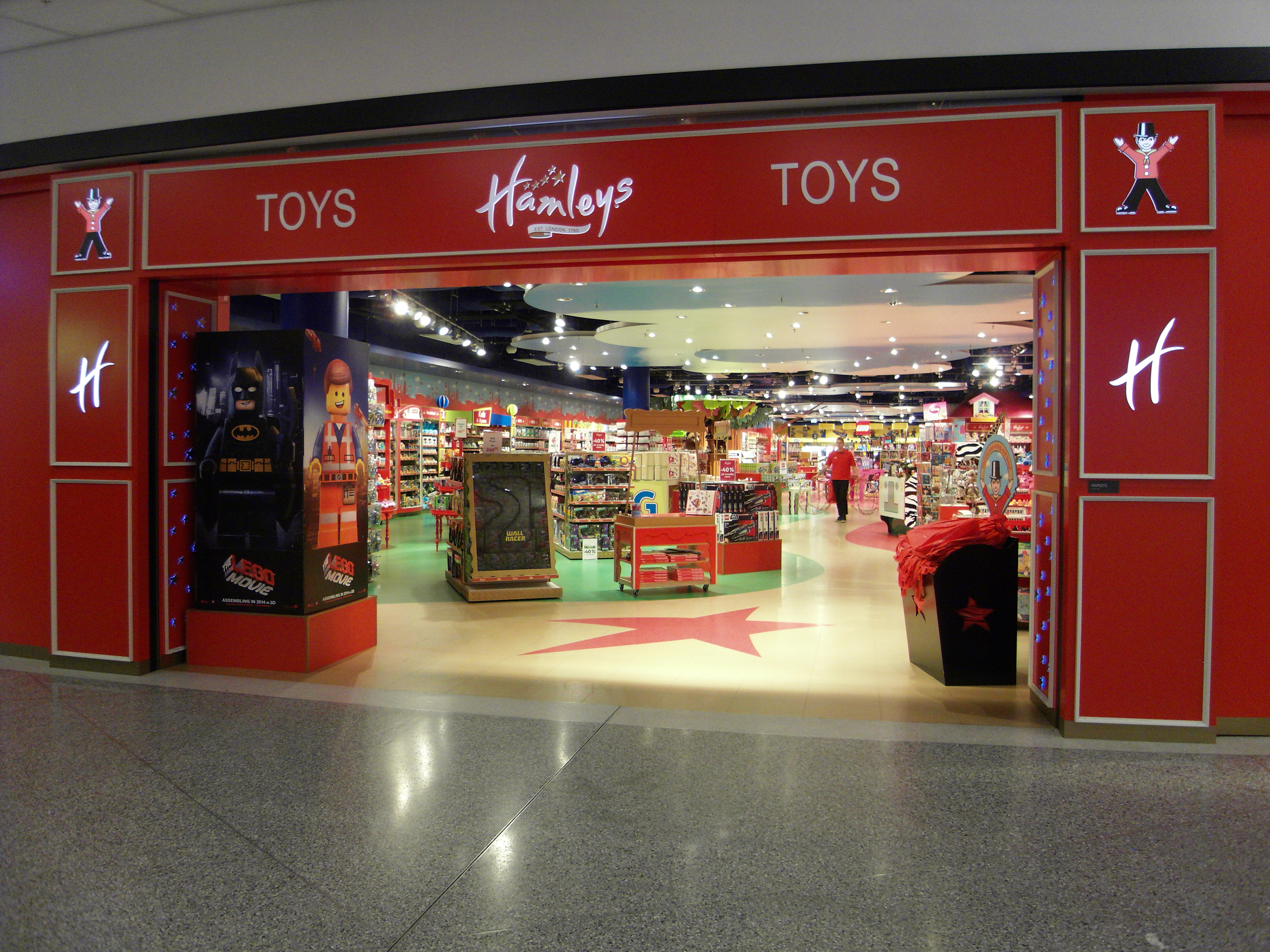
A Hamleys store at the shopping mall Emporia in Malmö, Sweden

Hamleys' European footprint existed in Denmark (three small stores) and, since October 2008, the Republic of Ireland, when it opened a 3,250-square-metre (35,000 sq ft) store in Pembroke Avenue, located adjacent to the Town Square in Dundrum, Dublin. On 12 October 2012, a Hamleys store opened at Nacka in Stockholm, Sweden. On 19 September 2013, a Hamley store opened as part of Steen og Strøm department store in Oslo, Norway. In April 2014 the Hamleys Denmark toy chain closed all four of its Danish locations when its Nordic parent company, Kids Retails, filed for bankruptcy.

Hamleys opened its first store outside Europe in Amman, Jordan, on 18 June 2008. The three-storey store on Mecca Street is run by the group's franchisee Jordan Centre. A Dubai franchise opened with two stores on 4 November 2008.

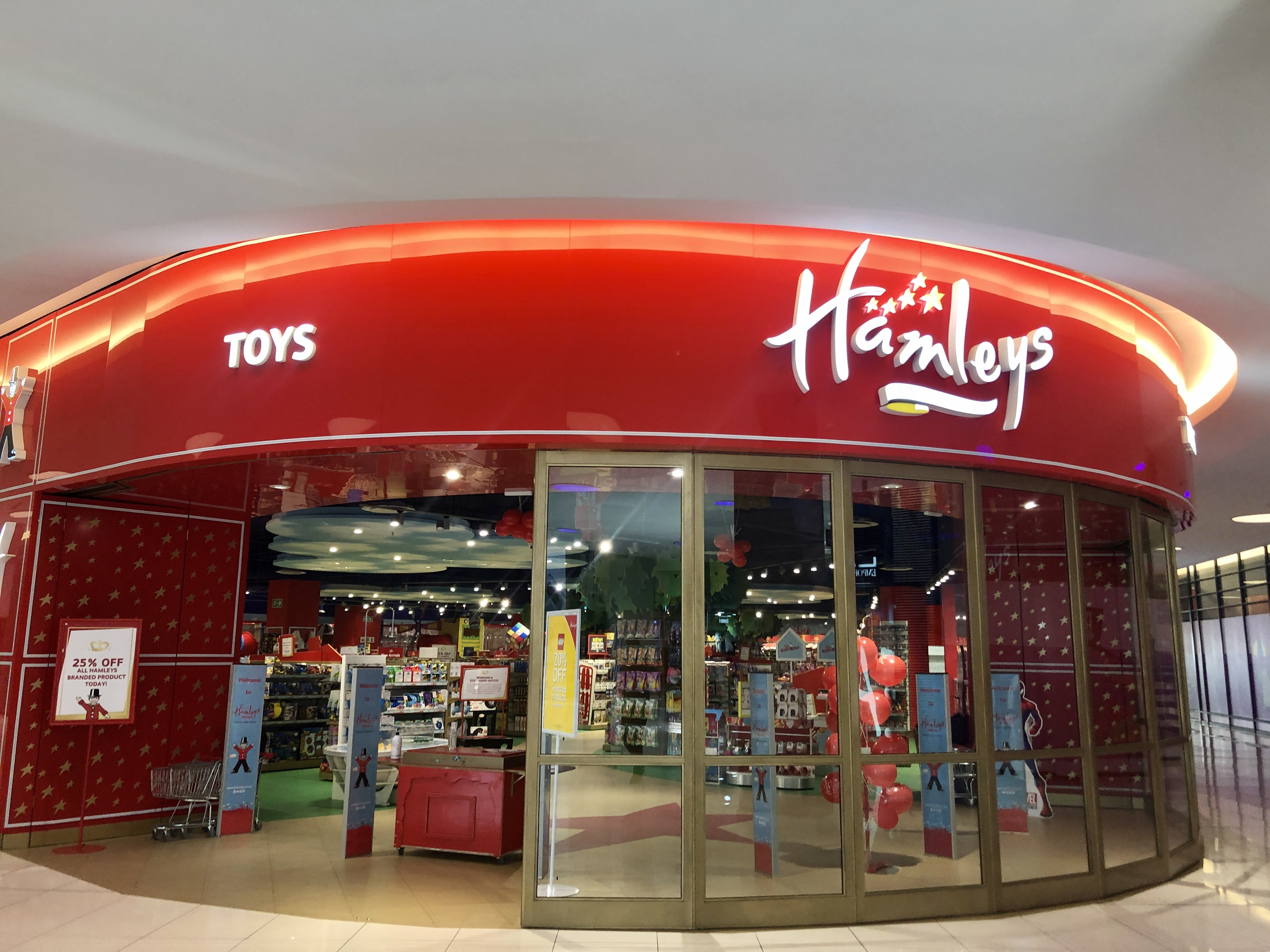
Hamleys store inside Fourways Mall in South Africa

The first store in South Asia was opened in Mumbai, India, on 9 April 2010. The 22,000-square-foot (2,000 m^{2}) store is located in an upmarket shopping district in India's financial capital. A second store in India is located in the city of Chennai at the Express Avenue Mall. The 11,000-square-foot (1,000 m^{2}) store has a London bus that customers can walk up through. It now has 78 stores in India, including three stores in Punjab with a recently opened store in Amritsar on 1 February 2018. Hamleys also opened its first store in Bhubaneswar at Esplanade One Mall On 10 January 2019. Hamleys also opened its first store in Lucknow at Fun Republic Mall. With this addition, the brand is now present in 26 cities with 50 stores across India. In Gujarat, Hamleys opened its first store at Ahmedabad One mall with 11,000 square feet (1,000 m^{2}) on 9 November 2014.

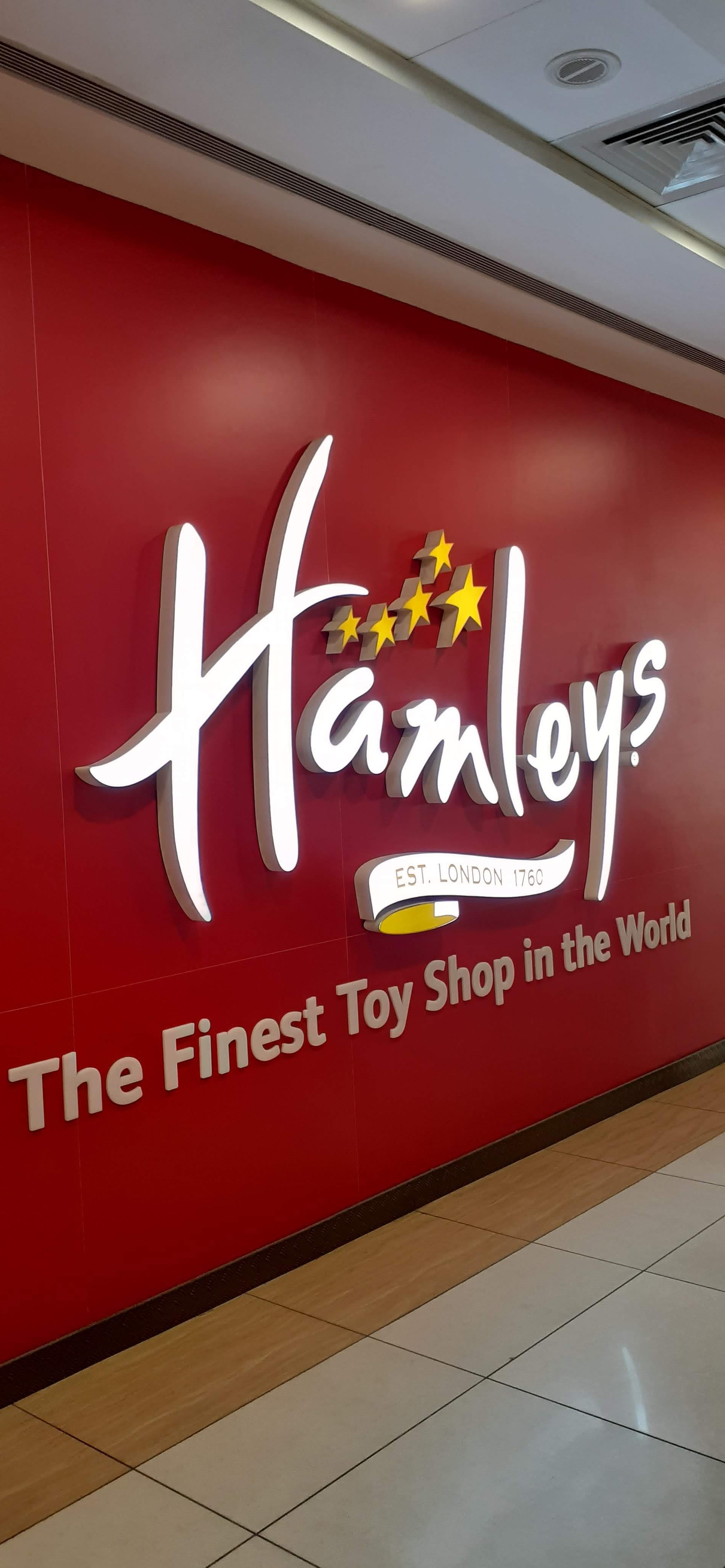
Hamleys, in Chennai, Tamil Nadu, India

Hamleys' opened a store in the Saudi capital Riyadh on 26 January 2012. The 2,100-square-metre (23,000 sq ft) shop is located in the Panorama mall at Takhassusi Street's intersection with Prince Mohammed Road.

In 2012 Hamleys opened its first store in Russia. It now operates two in Moscow, one in Saint-Petersburg and one in Krasnodar.

In 2013, Hamleys announced plans to open 20 stores across India in collaboration with Reliance Brands Ltd. The company also announced that a store would open in the One Utama Shopping Mall in Kuala Lumpur, in November 2013, the first in Southeast Asia. Malaysia is now a home for three Hamleys stores, with new outlets opened in the Quill Mall, Kuala Lumpur and in the satellite terminal of Kuala Lumpur International Airport.

In 2014, Hamleys opened its first store in the Philippines. The store opened in Central Square, Bonifacio Highstreet, Bonifacio Global City, Taguig City. A second Philippine Hamleys store is also set to open the following year. Stores Specialists Inc. (SSI) Group is the exclusive distributor of Hamleys in the Philippines.

In 2015, an Abu Dhabi franchise opened with two stores in World Trade Centre Mall (WTC) and Yas Mall, Yas Island.

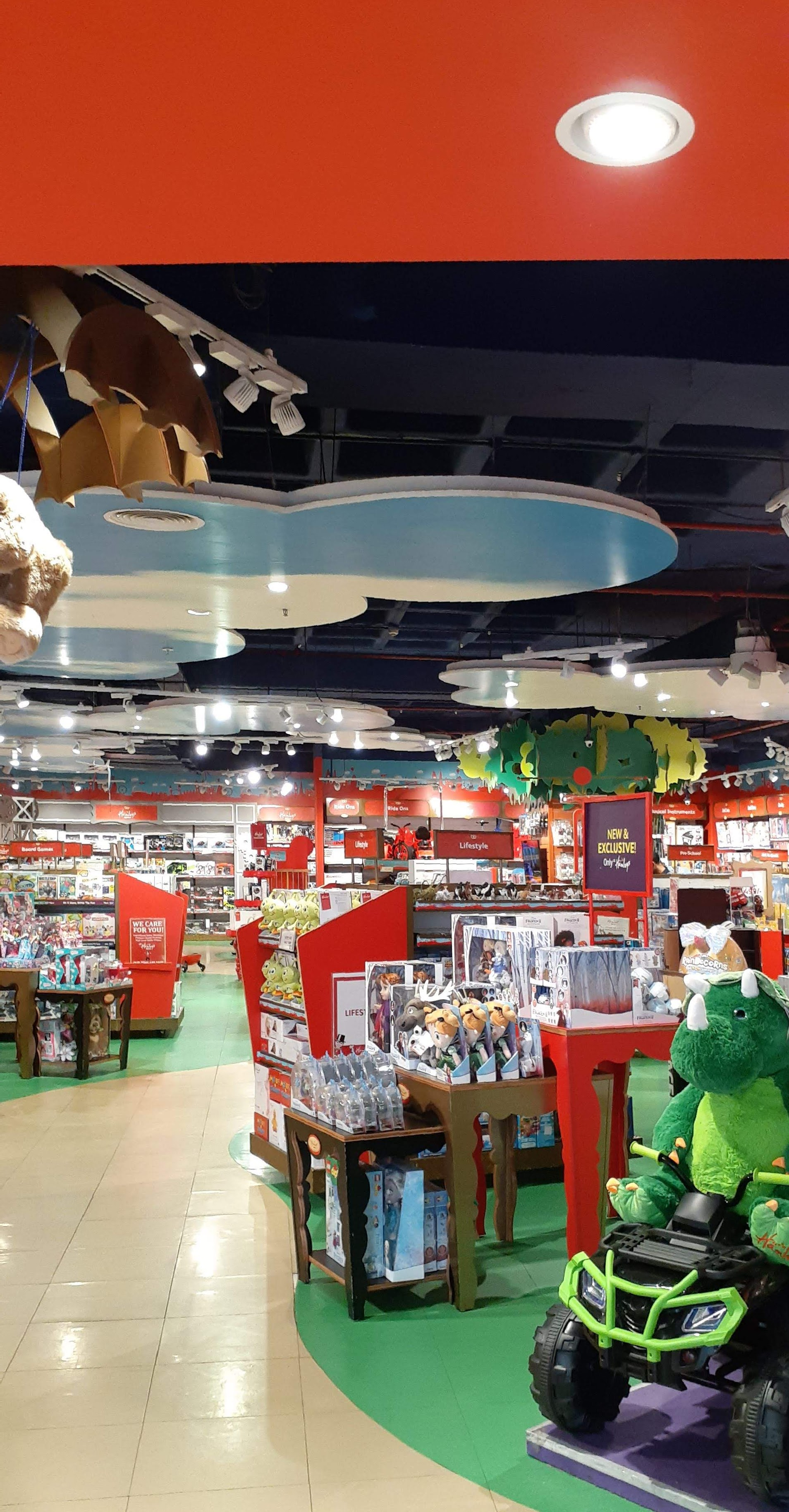
Inside Hamleys toy shop, Chennai, Tamil Nadu, India

In July 2015, a store opened in Plaza Singapura, Singapore. This is the first Hamleys store to be established in Singapore. Subsequently, a second store was introduced at Marina Bay Sands.

On 27 August 2015, a store opened in Victoria & Alfred Waterfront, Cape Town, South Africa. Six other stores have opened in South Africa: at Mall of Africa, Sandton City, Gateway Mall, Fourways Mall, The Zone @ Rosebank and Eastgate Mall.

In November 2015, a store opened at Antara Polanco Fashion Mall in Mexico City, its first store in Mexico. As of June 2018, there are four stores in Mexico: one in Querétaro at Antea LifeStyle Center, one in Veracruz at Andamar Lifestyle Center and two in Mexico City at Antara Polanco Fashion Mall and Artz Pedregal.

A store is present in Nicosia, Cyprus. There is also a store in Malta.

In 2016, Hamleys opened a store in Prague, Czech Republic, in Na Příkopě Street.

In 2017, a Hamleys store was opened in Hull, England to celebrate the UK City of Culture, in the shopping centre, Princes Quay.

Also in 2017, a store was opened in Warsaw, Poland, at the Galeria Północna shopping mall.

In April 2018, it was confirmed that the Dublin store would close after being open for 10 years.

In December 2018, it was also announced that the Trafford Centre branch would close after a short time in operation.

In 2018, a proposal was announced to open a store in New York City near Herald Square, though nothing has progressed as of 2023.

In April 2019 it was reported that an Indian Company Reliance Retail was planning to buy out the British toy store chain.

In May 2019 it was confirmed that Reliance Retail, a subsidiary of Reliance Industries Limited on 9 May 2019 signed a definitive agreement for Reliance Retail to acquire 100 per cent shares of Hamleys Global Holdings Limited. Hamleys is planning to open a Hamleys in The Gate Mall in Kuwait.

In November 2022, Hamleys opened a store in Albania. It is located in the heart of Tirana, inside the Emerald mall. It covers the entire second floor with toys, the third floor with Hamleys party rooms and attractions on both floors.

In 2023, Hamleys opened a store in Rome.

== Website ==
In the 1990s Hamleys had two websites, one for the UK which did not sell anything, and a U.S. version with a basic inventory. This changed in 1999 with the launch of hamleys.com. The site offered worldwide shipping and focused on user experience, customer service and the sale of traditional products and collectables. The chief executive of Hamleys told Marketing magazine "I do not want to become embroiled with the likes of Toys 'R' Us, Toyzone and eToys, which are fighting on price alone and will end up making next to no margin".

In 2006, a glitch on the website allowed customers to claim a 60% discount on any product.

Econsultancy critiqued the site for its basic approach in 2013, and felt that it "doesn't do a lot to represent the brand; in fact, it may even detract from it".

== See also ==
- Reliance Retail
- Benjamin Pollock's Toy Shop
- Gamleys
