= Early Learning Centre =

British toy retailer

- Company type: Private (Subsidiary)
- Industry: Toys
- Founded: 1974; 52 years ago
- Founder: John Beale
- Headquarters: South Marston Industrial Estate near Swindon, Wiltshire England (1974–2007); Cherry Tree Road, Watford, Hertfordshire, England (2007–2019); Amersham, England (since 2019)
- Number of locations: 400 worldwide
- Key people: See Parent company
- Products: Educational toys
- Owner: Independent (1974–2007); Mothercare (2007–2019); The Entertainer (2019–)
- Website: www.elc.co.uk

The Early Learning Centre (ELC) is a British retailer that sells toys aimed at younger children. Previously a subsidiary of Mothercare from 2007 to 2019, it has been part of The Entertainer (through its parent company TEAL Group Holdings) since.

== History ==
The original shop opened in 1974 on London Street, Reading, Berkshire. The business was started by John Richard Beale. The mail order department was in the basement. Beale employed a child psychologist to ensure that the toys and books were of a positive and educational value to children.

It was successful and within a year, much larger premises in Silver Street, Reading, were obtained.

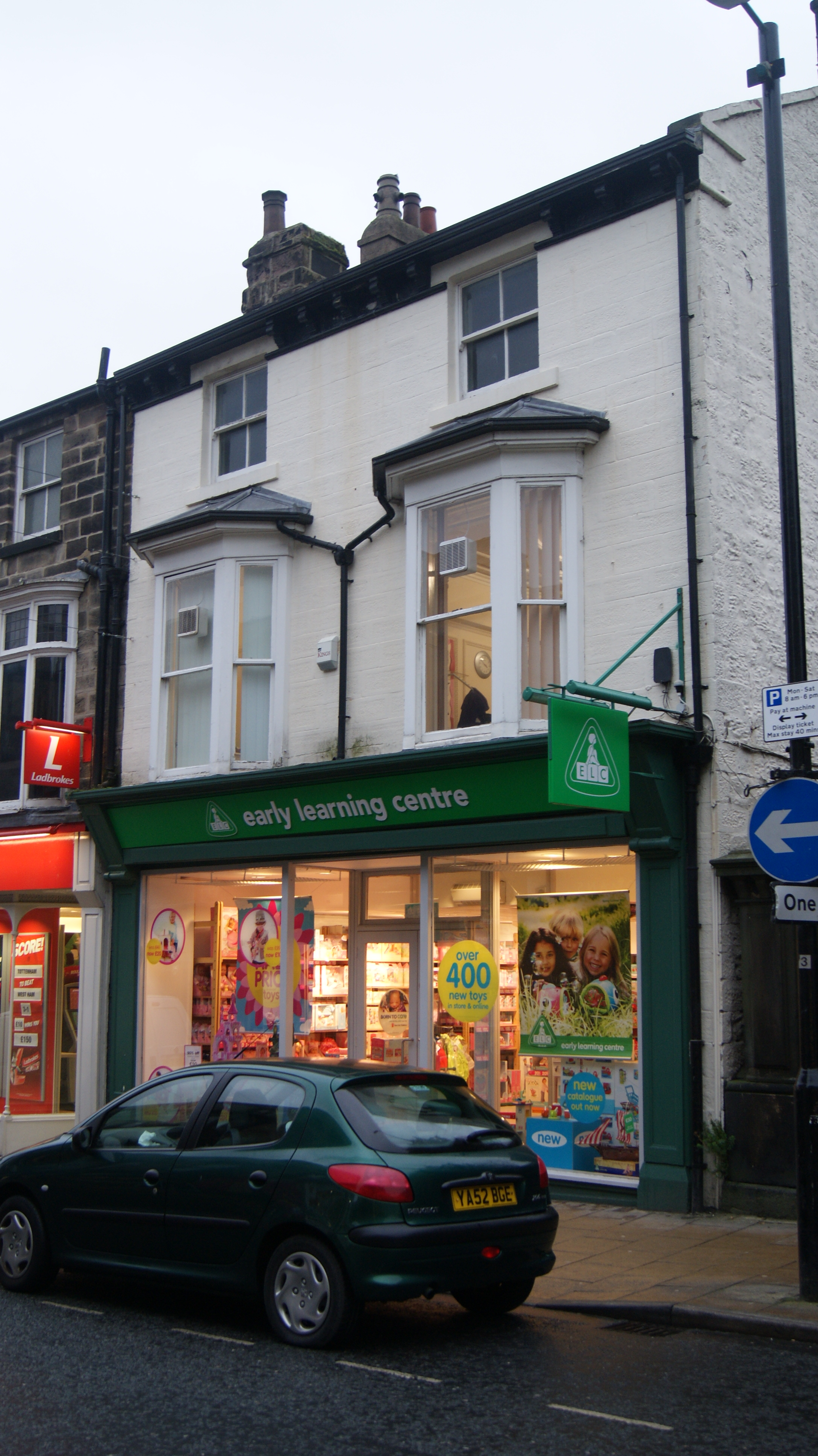
Early Learning Centre in Harrogate, North Yorkshire (2013)

Originally set up as a mail order company in 1974 and based near Swindon, by 1980, it had ten shops, and has since grown to 215 shops in the United Kingdom, and over 80 in 19 other countries including Qatar, the United Arab Emirates, Canada, and Australia. In addition, their toys are available in some stores of Boots and Sainsbury's.

In the 1980s, ELC opened a number of "nursery stores", which sold equipment such as pushchairs and cots. A short-lived chain of four specialist children's bookstores, 'Reading Matters', emerged at the same time, with flagship stores in Exeter and Reading.

Since 2001, the company sells via their website. Over 80% of products sold are own brand, being designed at a research centre in Hong Kong.

=== Takeovers ===
In May 1985, John Menzies rescued ELC. Sales struggled at the end of the 1990s.

After some years, the company's board of directors led by Mike France, bought the company back in October 2001 for £30 million, being backed by 3i, before selling it to Tim Waterstone (who founded Waterstones bookstores) under the name Eagle Retail Investments, for £62 million in April 2004, and he joined it with his Daisy & Tom chain of shops within the "Chelsea Stores Group".

In June 2007, ELC was purchased by Mothercare for £85 million, from Chelsea Stores Holdings. Mothercare continued to expand the high street presence of ELC by opening additional stores; mainly as concessions within over one hundred stores of Mothercare.

On 12 March 2019, it was announced that ELC would be purchased by The Entertainer for £13.5 million, formally through TEAL Group Holdings.
