= Douglasdale, Gauteng =

Douglasdale
- Location within Gauteng Location within South Africa
- Coordinates: 26°2′23″S 27°59′41″E
- Country: South Africa
- Province: Gauteng
- Municipality: City of Johannesburg
- Main Place: Sandton

Area
  - Total: 3.00 km^{2} (1.16 sq mi)

Population (2011)
  - Total: 10,708
  - Density: 3,570/km^{2} (9,240/sq mi)

Racial makeup (2011)
  - Black African: 22.0%
  - Coloured: 2.6%
  - Indian/Asian: 7.8%
  - White: 66.3%
  - Other: 1.2%

First languages (2011)
  - English: 74.2%
  - Afrikaans: 9.6%
  - Zulu: 3.7%
  - Xhosa: 1.9%
  - Other: 10.6%
- Time zone: UTC+2 (SAST)
- Postal code (street): 2191
- PO box: 2165

Douglasdale is a residential suburb in Sandton, Gauteng, South Africa. It is located between the suburbs of Fourways and Bryanston. Often confused as a suburb of the Fourways District. The eight lane N1 freeway (Western Bypass) forms its south eastern boundary. It is in Region C of the City of Johannesburg Metropolitan Municipality.

== History ==
Douglasdale is built upon Douglasdale Farm, a large farm that was started in 1905 by Thomas Douglas and his wife Janet Alexander who both immigrated to South Africa from Scotland in 1890.

They bought the farm on the Klein Jukskei River in Johannesburg and named it the Douglasdale farm. The farmhouse is one of the oldest homes in Sandton and was built in 1905. In 1930 the family started producing milk as a hobby and in 1940 they began to retail their milk producing over 240 bottles of milk a day, by hand. In the 1950s, Douglasdale milk was delivered by horse and cart and later by delivery men on bicycles.

Today the dairy produces 1.5% of the total countries daily milk production.

== Education ==
Douglasdale is home to many different Pre-primary, Primary and secondary schools

Pre-Primary

- Curro Douglasdale
- Douglasdale Nursery School
- Little Earth Kids
- Little Royal Academy
- Bryndale Pre-Primary

Primary

- Bryndale Primary

Secondary

- Fourways High School
- Kings College and Preparatory School

== Security and Safety ==
The Douglasdale SAPS South African Police Service services the majority of the Fourways District and Bryanston, Gauteng area.
