= Ntombi Khumalo =

South African politician

Member of the National Assembly of South Africa
- In office 10 November 2021 – 28 May 2024
- Preceded by: Cameron Mackenzie
- Constituency: Gauteng

Member of the City of Johannesburg Mayoral Committee for Corporate and Shared Services
- In office 28 August 2016 – November 2019
- Preceded by: Mally Mokoena
- Succeeded by: Loyiso Masuku

Personal details
- Born: Ntombi Valencia Khumalo
- Party: Democratic Alliance
- Profession: Politician, lecturer

Ntombi Valencia Khumalo is a South African politician who served as a member of the National Assembly of South Africa from 2021 to 2024. She is a member of the Democratic Alliance (DA).

== Background ==
Khumalo holds a master's degree in somatology. She had worked in the somatology industry for more than a decade. She worked as the head therapist at Matispa from 2007 to 2008, when she resigned to become a lecturer at the University of Johannesburg. Khumalo later obtained a doctorate in health professions education. She has published research papers in peer-reviewed journals and presented local and international conventions as well.

== Political career ==
In 2016, Khumalo was elected as a DA councillor in the City of Johannesburg Metropolitan Municipality. After the election of the DA's Herman Mashaba as mayor, he appointed Khumalo as the Member of the Mayoral Committee (MMC) for Corporate and Shared Services. Khumalo served in the Mayoral Committee until Mashaba resigned as mayor in November 2019 and the DA subsequently lost control of the metro.

On 18 March 2020, Khumalo was appointed as the Shadow Member of the Mayoral Committee (SMMC) for Economic Development by DA Caucus leader, Leah Knott.

== Parliamentary career ==
In 2019, Khumalo stood for election to the South African National Assembly as 63rd on the DA's regional list and 196th on the party's national list. She was not elected to parliament.

Gauteng DA MP Cameron Mackenzie died from COVID-19 complications in July 2021. On 9 September 2021, the DA appointed Khumalo to take up his seat in the National Assembly. She was sworn in as a Member of Parliament on 10 November 2021 by National Assembly Speaker Nosiviwe Mapisa-Nqakula.

Khumalo was not reelected to Parliament at the 2024 elections.
