= Fourways Mall =

Coordinates: 26.0188596°S 28.0042335°E

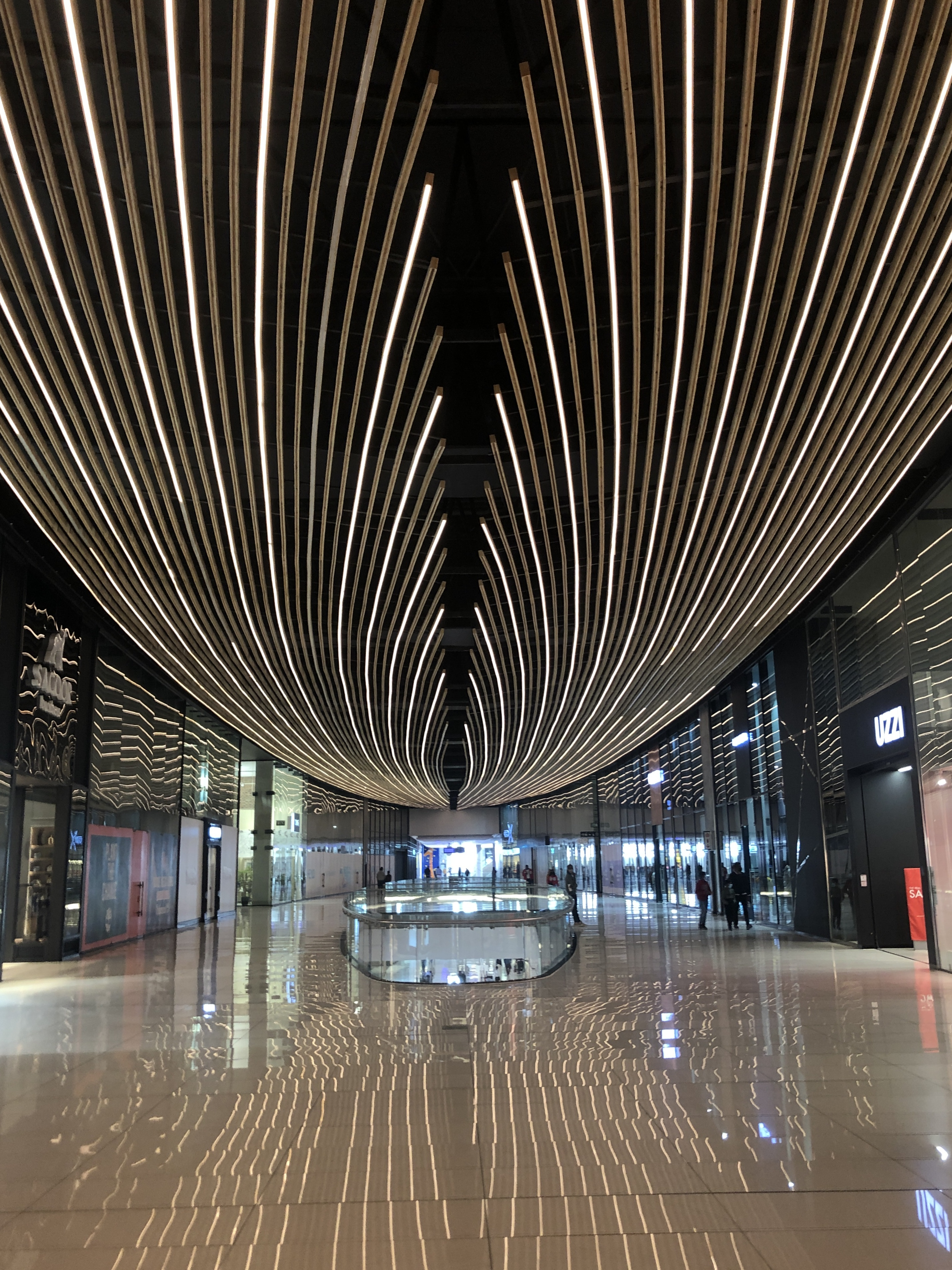
- Inside Fourways Mall
- Location: Fourways, Sandton, South Africa
- Address: 11 Ruby Cl, Witkoppen, Sandton, 2068
- Opened: 1994
- Owner: Accelerate Property Fund
- Num. of stores: 400
- Floor area: 178,000 sqm
- Parking: 8,000+
- Website: https://fourwaysmall.com/

Fourways Mall is a large shopping mall in South Africa located in the Fourways area of Sandton, in suburban Johannesburg. It is the largest shopping mall in South Africa by floorspace, with a total of 178,000 square meters.

Originally constructed in 1994, the mall more than doubled its size and relaunched in 2019.

== Features ==
Fourways Mall comprises over 400 stores, a two-level food court, a massive open-air exhibition arena, an entertainment area (including movie theatres, a sizeable outdoor mini golf course and Bounce), various restaurants, and 8,000 parking bays

The mall's anchor tenants include Pick n Pay, Dis-Chem, Woolworths, Game, and Checkers.

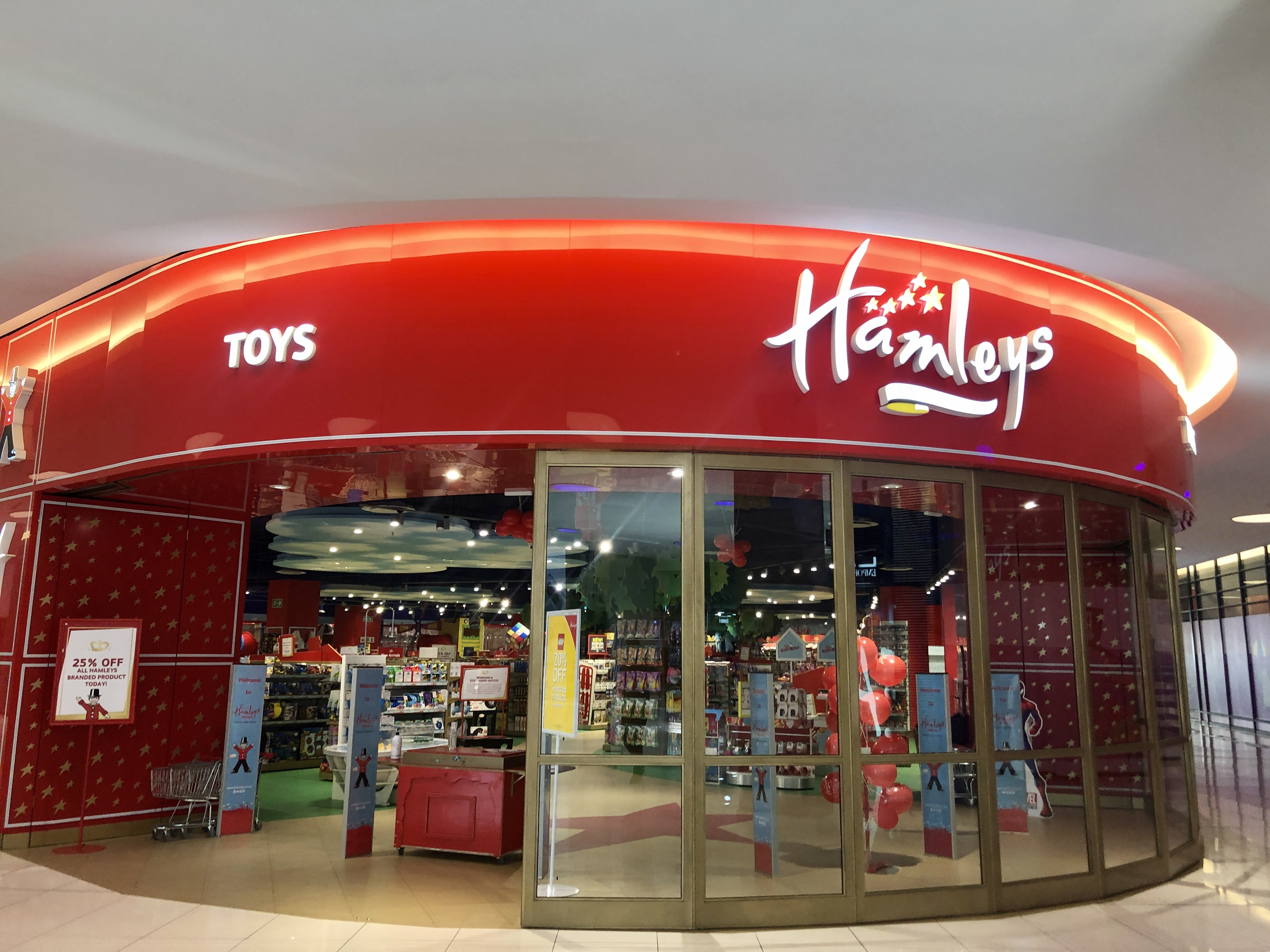
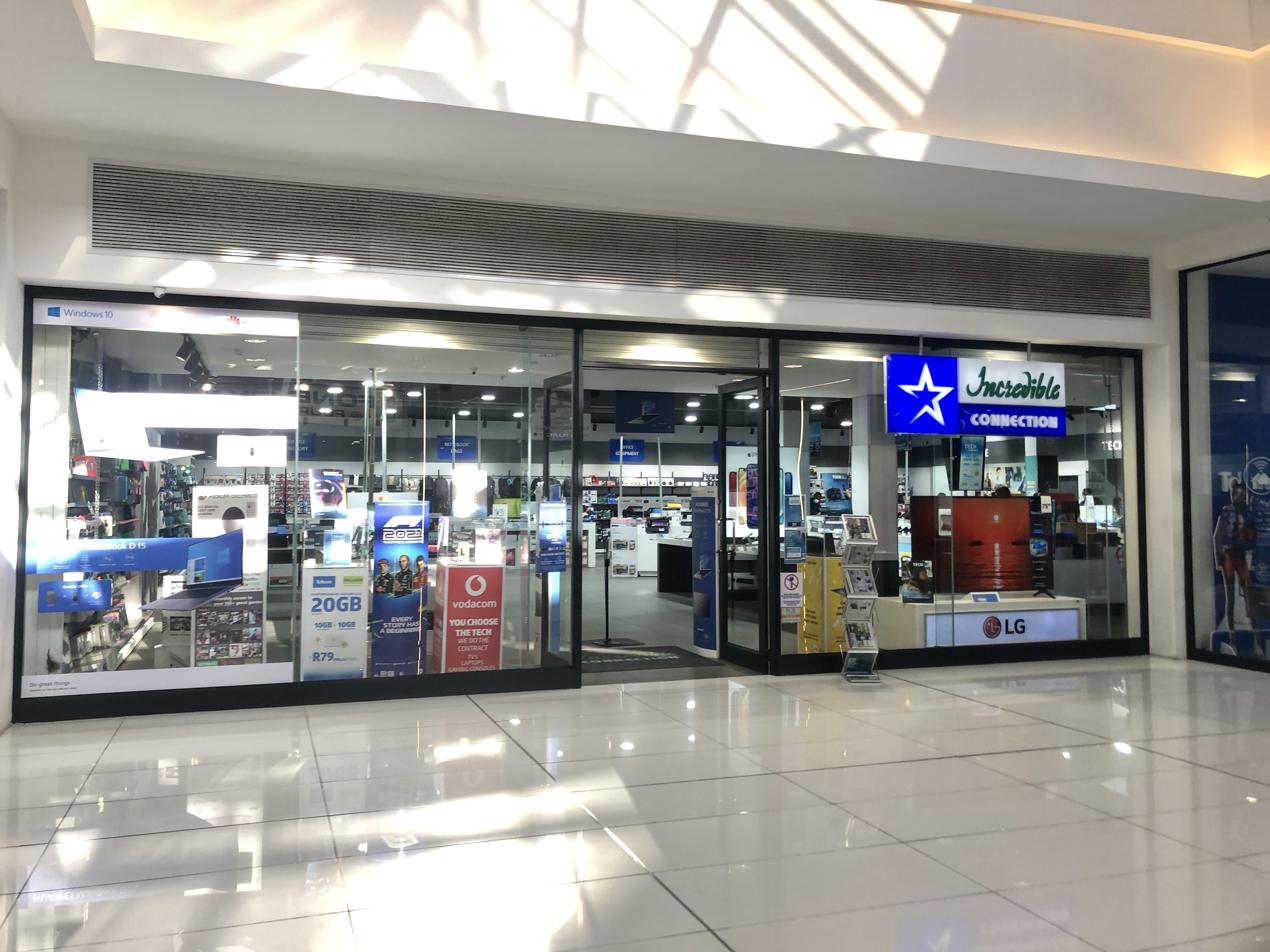
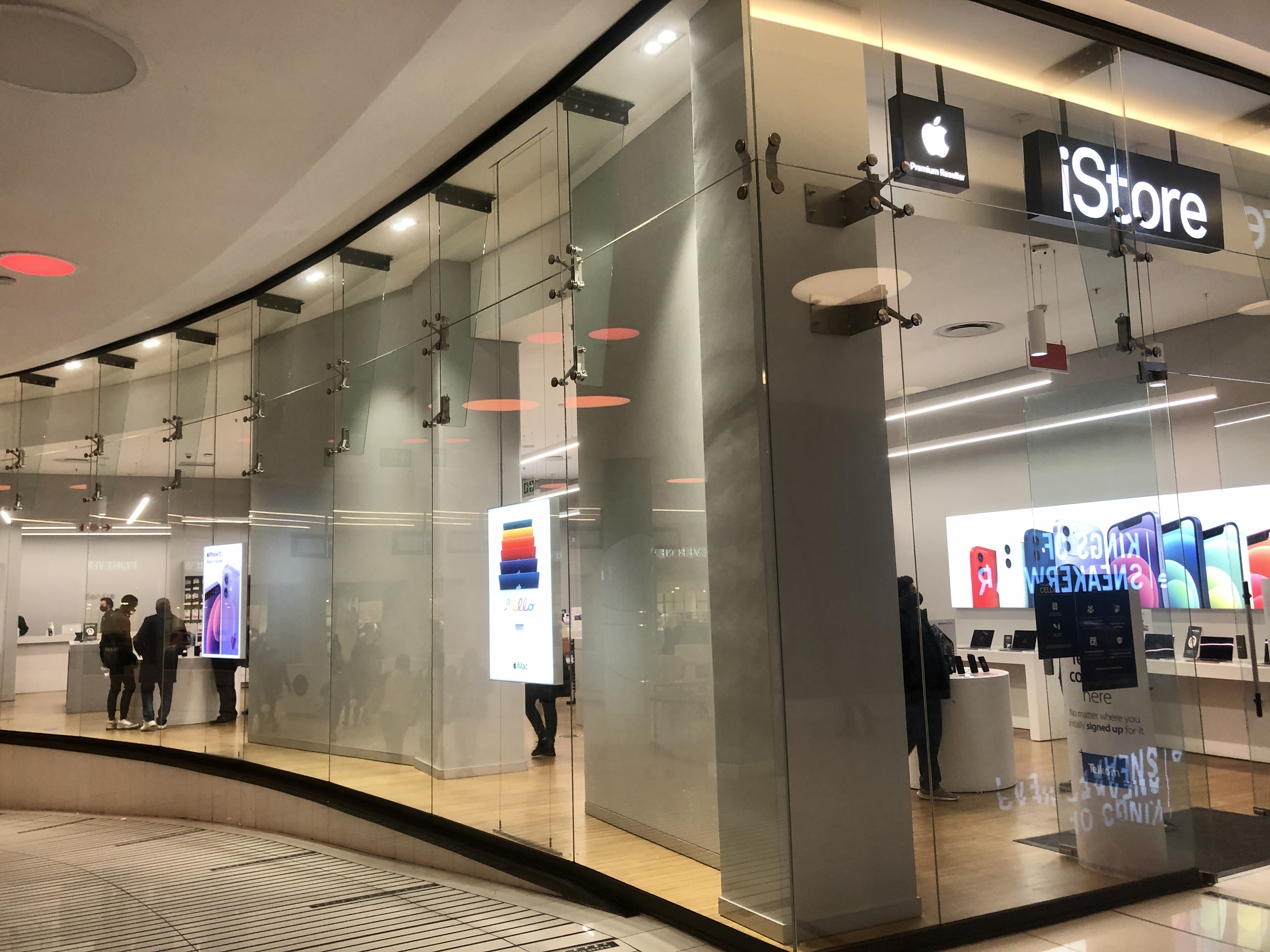
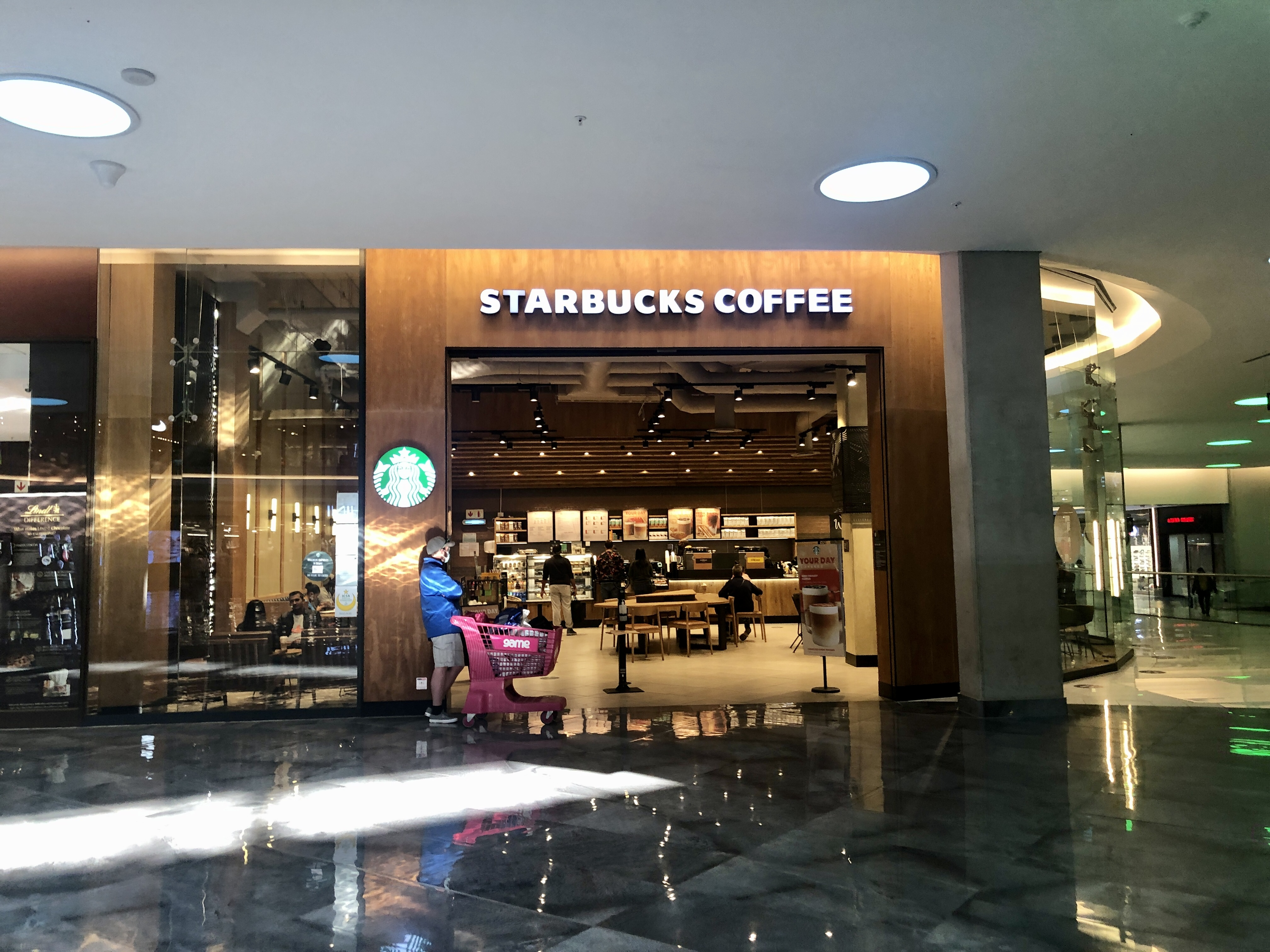

== Events ==
=== Stranger Things Experience ===
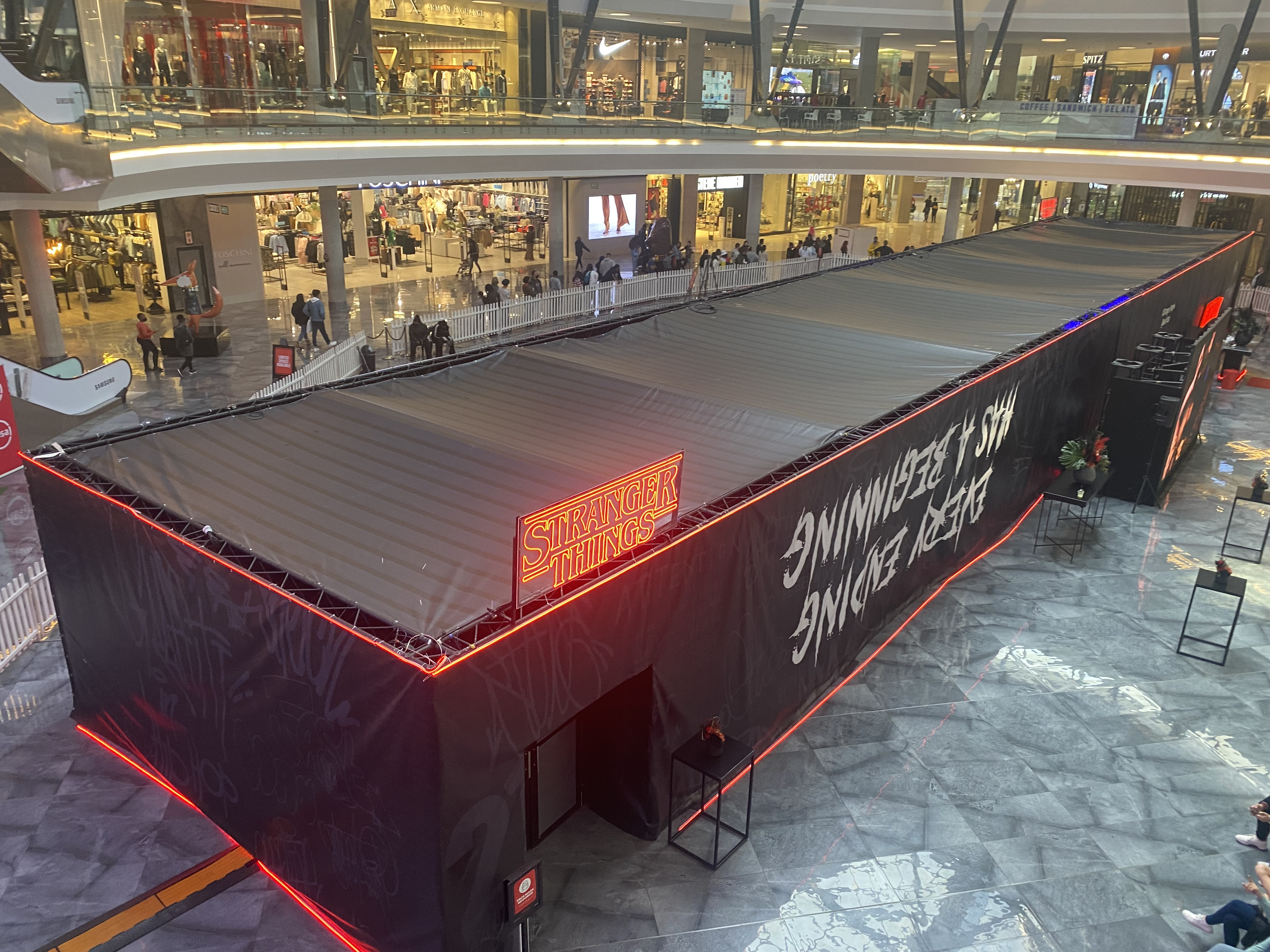
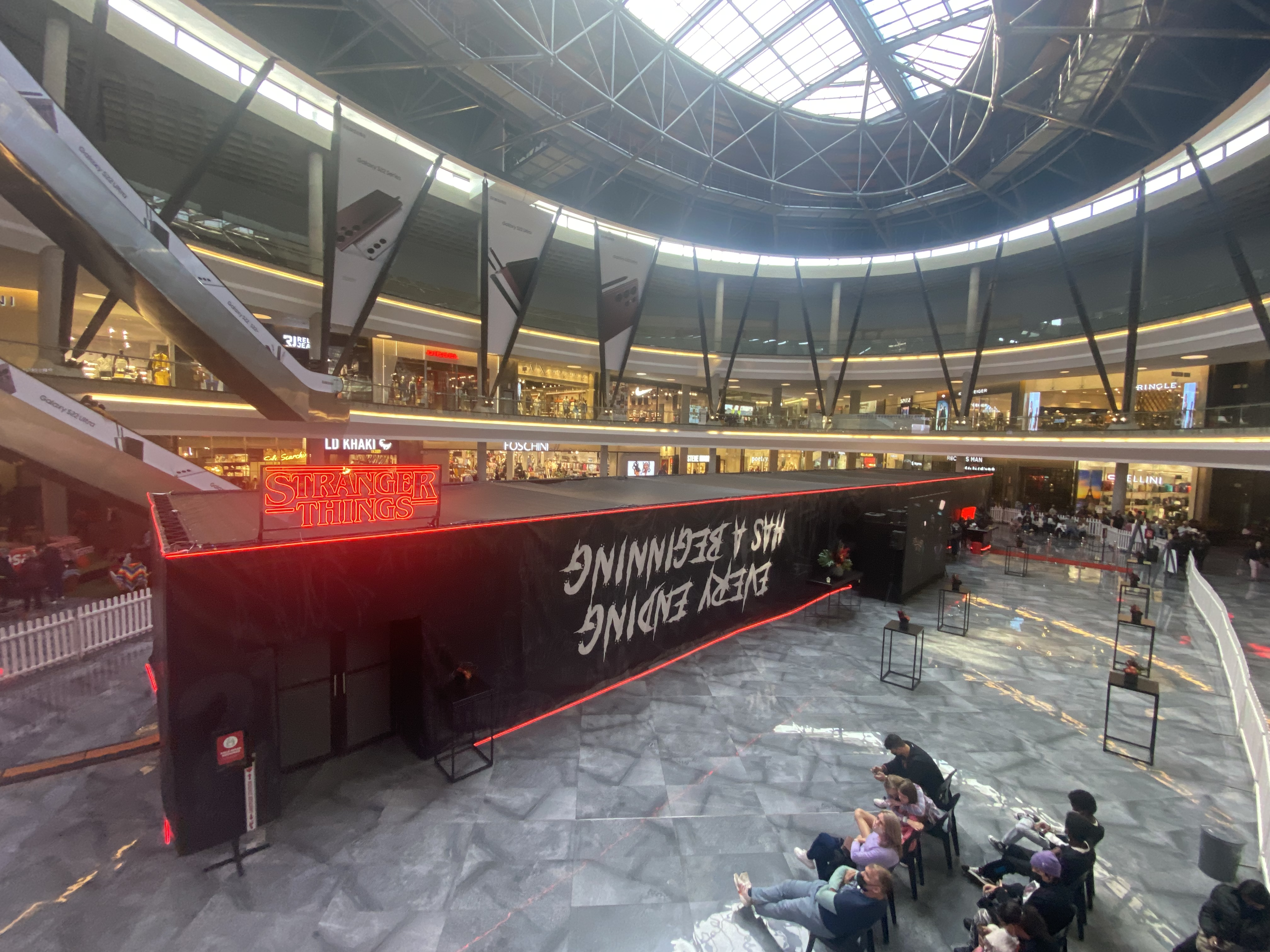
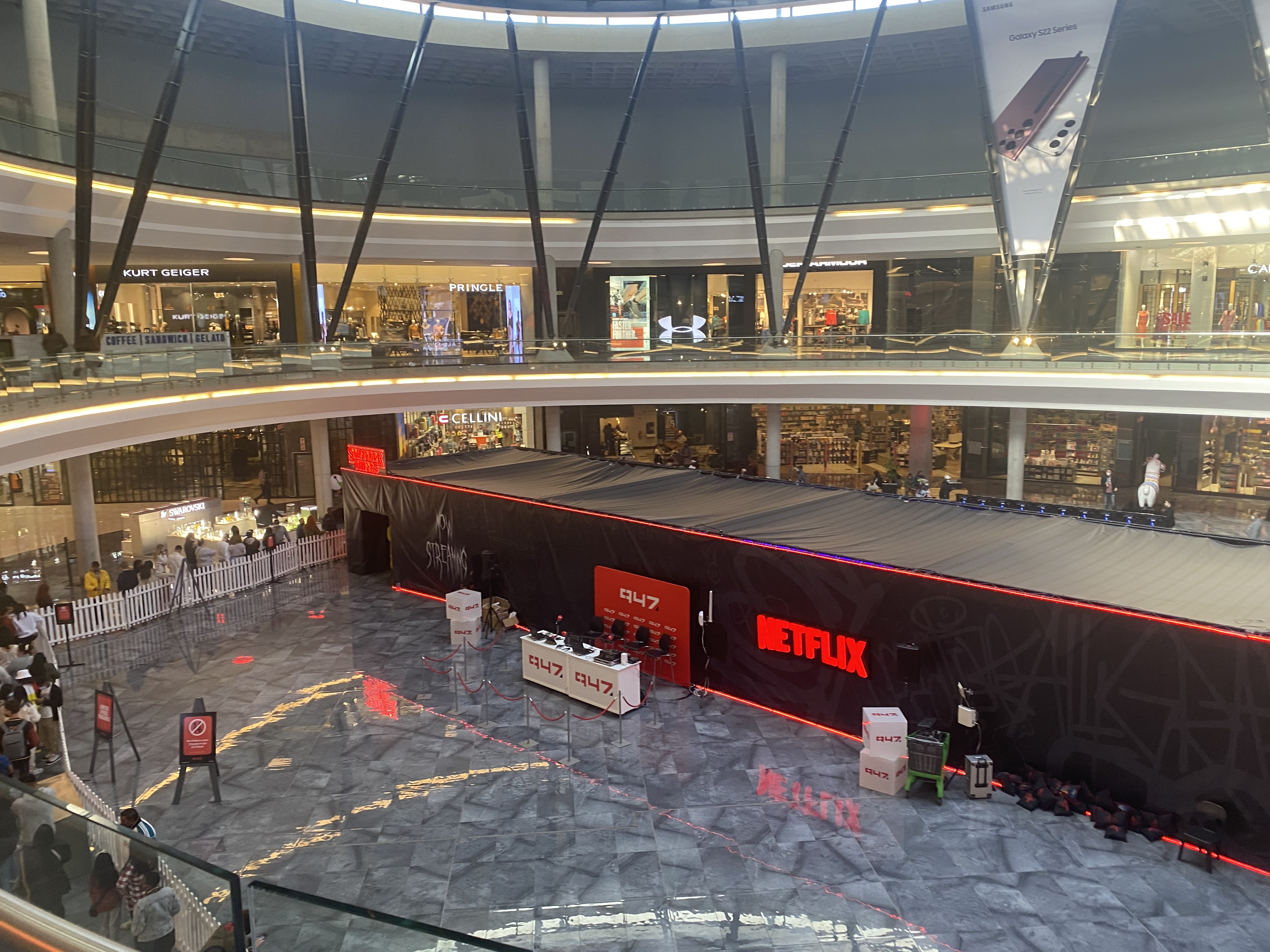

From 16 June 2022 to 19 June 2022, Netflix South Africa partnered with Fourways Mall to operate the Stranger Things Experience. The Experience previously operated at the Canal Walk Mall in Cape Town.
