= The Entertainer (retailer) =

British toy retailer

The Entertainer (Amersham) Limited
- Formerly: Funtech Limited (September–November 1986); Peter James Limited (1986–2001)
- Type: Limited company
- Industry: Retail
- Founded: 1981; 45 years ago
- Founder: Catherine and Gary Grant
- Headquarters: Amersham, England
- Number of locations: 160 (Aug 2025)
- Area served: United Kingdom; Isle of Man; Jersey; United Arab Emirates; Pakistan; Azerbaijan; Ireland (in Tesco); Indonesia; Singapore; Malaysia
- Key people: Andrew Murphy (chief executive)
- Brands: Gamleys (defunct); ToyZone (defunct)
- Owner: Employee owned (EOT)
- Number of employees: 1,900 (Aug 2025)
- Parent: TEAL Group Holdings
- Subsidiaries: Addo; Early Learning Centre
- Website: thetoyshop.com

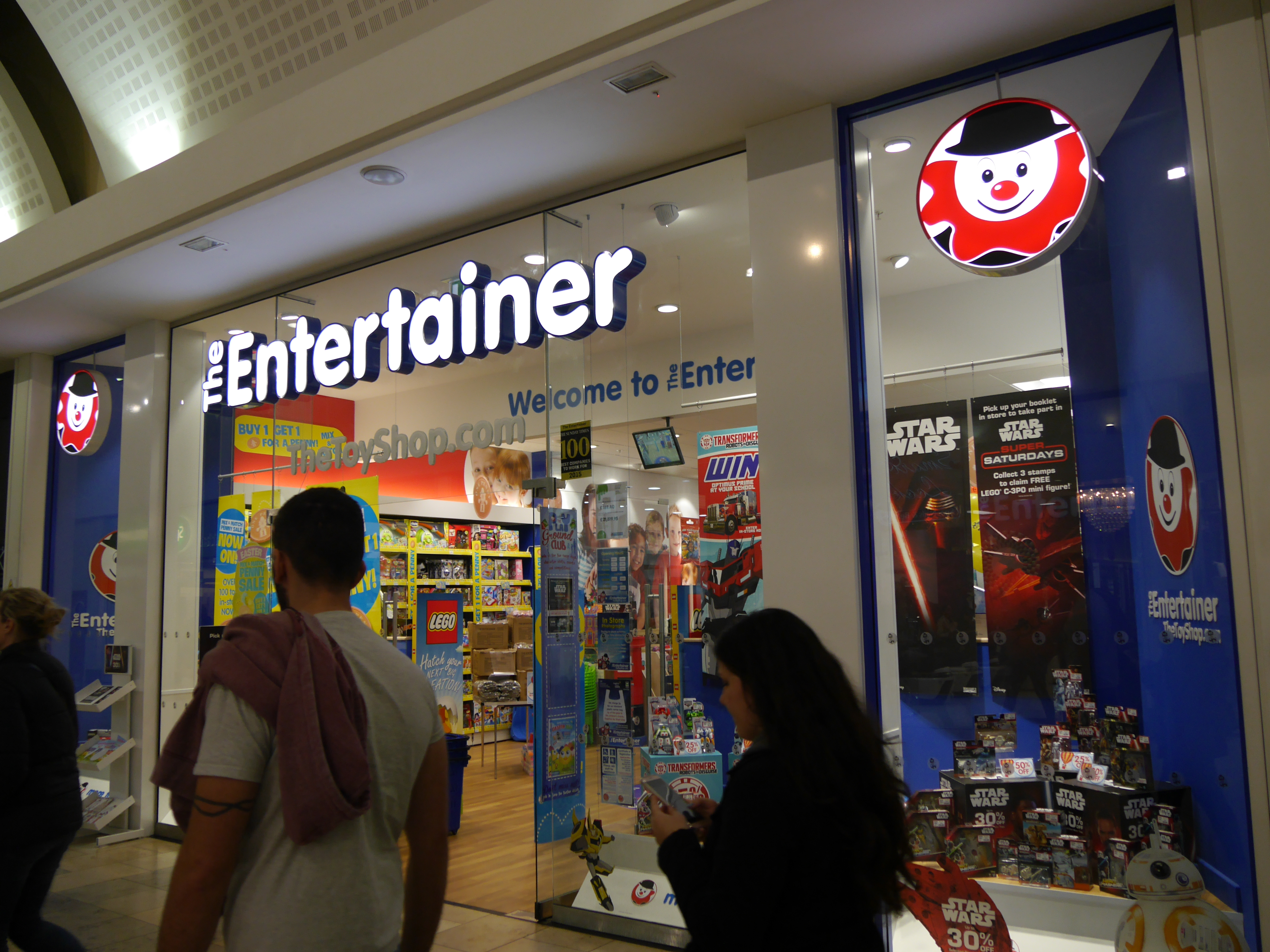
The Entertainer, Southside Wandsworth, London

The Entertainer (Amersham) Limited is an international toy retailer founded based in Amersham, England, the town of its first location.

The biggest independent toy retailer in the UK, with 160 stores across the United Kingdom, Jersey, the Isle of Man. It also operates over 1,000 concessions in the UK and Ireland through partnerships with retailers Tesco, Matalan, and Moonpig, whilst also providing home delivery services via Deliveroo.

With an international presence too, as of July 2026, the retailer has 22 store locations worldwide.

The retailer has had an online business since 1999, called TheToyShop.com.

In 2025, The Entertainer became the UK’s second largest employee-owned business.

== History ==
In 1981, married couple Catherine and Gary Grant took over The Pram and Toy Bar in Amersham, with Catherine coming up with 'The Entertainer' as its new trading name.

In 1985, they purchased their second shop, in Beaconsfield. In April 1991, ten years after the acquisition of the toy shop in Amersham, the chain opened its third shop in Slough. The company then underwent massive expansion and, by 2001, the chain had opened its 25th shop, in the Victoria Centre in Nottingham. By November 2008, the chain had 50 stores.

Strategic planning to take The Entertainer international began in 2012, and, in February 2013, The Entertainer extended to Pakistan and Dubai through franchise agreements.

In March 2014, the retailer opened its 100th store, in Aylesbury.

In May 2014, locations opened at Dalma Mall and Deerfields Mall, in Abu Dhabi. In November 2014, a store in Azerbaijan opened in partnership with The Zeta Group.

In 2016, the organisation signed a franchise agreement with the Ermes Group to open concessions in Debenhams stores in Cyprus.

In 2017, a deal was signed with Axiom Group to bring The Entertainer to Kosovo, with the first stores in the country opening in 2017-18. In the same year, the retailer also entered a joint venture with JGC in Malta.

In September 2018, a partnership began with Matalan, opening 59 in-store concessions under the name 'Totally Toys'.

In December 2018, The Entertainer announced it had rescued Poly Toys in Spain from administration, with 57 stores and 350 jobs saved.

In February 2019, The Entertainer purchased Early Learning Centre from Mothercare, which included 520 international franchise outlets. By the end of the year, 26 international partners had been onboarded and over 500 new stores added to the international estate through the Early Learning Centre acquisition.

In March 2020, the retailer closed all 172 of its stores temporarily, due to the COVID-19 pandemic.

In May 2021, The Entertainer converted one of its Poly Toys stores in Spain to The Entertainer fascia.

In October 2020, The Entertainer started a trial programme with Asda, replacing the supermarket's existing toy aisles with branded concessions in some stores. The programme ended in February 2022.

In September 2022, The Entertainer signed a new trial agreement with Tesco, placing in-store concessions in 35 supermarkets. In January 2024, Tesco announced they would extend this agreement to 850 stores throughout the UK and Ireland.

In September 2023, the company appointed Andrew Murphy as its new group chief executive, who joined the following month from John Lewis Partnership.

In March 2024, it was announced that Poly Toys in Spain would begin liquidation procedure.

In April 2025, it was announced the Tesco concession partnership would expand to include over 2,000 Tesco Express stores.

In August 2025, GCC franchise partner change - ALGT (A Liusie General Trading) acquired the Early Learning Centre Middle East franchise operations from Kamal Osman Jamjoom Group (KOJ) — 28 retail locations across the GCC. ALGT enters a strategic partnership with The Entertainer, taking over from KOJ as our GCC operating partner.

Later that month, the founders announced that they were transferring their entire ownership of the company to an employee ownership trust, which would become effective from September 2025. Announcing the deal, Gary Grant said: "This is good for the business and it’s really good for our staff. Finishing well and leaving a business that has over many decades tried to be a force for good is really important to us.". As part of the deal, the founders will get a return from future profits.

The handover was completed on September 26th 2025.

In UAE the first Carrefour concession opened becoming the first international deployment of The Entertainer's Toy-Box Retail Solution, the B2B2C model announced by Group CEO Andrew Murphy OBE, applied to a major regional grocery partner.

== Religious views ==
Catherine and Gary are both devout Christians, and consequently some business decisions may have been influenced by this under their stewardship. The retailer did not open on Sundays, which is considered the Lord's Day in Christianity, to give employees the chance to spend time with friends and family.

After the official handover, the company announced they would be trialling Sunday openings for a 6-month period as a “natural development for any business to maximise its growth potential and provide further benefit to all stakeholders.” They also expanded their product ranges to “fully capitalise on the opportunities available to grow the business for the benefit of our staff and make it more convenient for our customers.”

Despite these changes, the company strives to maintain as much of the Grant family’s ethos, “maintaining the same guiding values of care, integrity, and maintaining a welcoming, family-friendly environment in our shops and throughout our business.”
