= Lonehill =

The Lonehill Koppie is a hill located in the suburb named after it, Lone Hill, which is located in Gauteng, South Africa. It is notable for the legends that surround the large boulder that sits atop the hill, precariously balanced on several other boulders.

== Legend ==
The first legend is that if the top boulder of the Lonehill Koppie were dislodged, all the whites in the country would leave. It's a latter-day version of an Anglo Boer War tale: that if the Boers dislodged the rock, the British would lose the war and leave South Africa.

A more recent legend is on how the Lonehill Nature Reserve was proclaimed a reserve. The motivation was centered around a rumour that a foreign individual was in the process of buying the area around the koppie, with the intent to remove the topmost rock. Local residents banded together and established the area as a nature reserve to prevent anyone from disturbing the well-known landmark.

== Description ==
The Lonehill Koppie stands out as a lone koppie on the northern border of the city's suburbs, 28 km north of the city centre, and is a reminder of what Johannesburg looked like before it was settled. It is a rocky veld with small streams trickling, dotted with shrubs, small trees and knee-high grasses. Guinea fowl and porcupines used to roam the area, and it is now populated with hundreds of dassies. There's a small dam, called Lonehill Loch, around 200 metres to its north, which is a popular walking spot for local residents.

The Koppie is largely made up of large, very old boulders, called tor rocks, with trees and indigenous shrubs now almost obscuring the rocks except for the topmost boulders.

These days it is surrounded by clusters of homes and developments in what is now the suburb of Lone Hill. The koppie itself is located on a plot of around 20 acres, surrounded by veld, which is around 80 metres high known as Lonehill Loch. It is unlocked only on weekends, allowing hikers and picnickers to climb to the top, or just lay out a picnic blanket in its surrounding grassy area.

The veld contains three Stone Age furnaces. These were excavated in the 1960s by Professor Revil Mason, formerly head of archaeology at Wits University. The furnaces were hidden by Mason, to protect them, because they would need a protective structure built around them and there was no funding to develop the site.

Mason estimated that the furnaces date to around 1600, the same period as the Melville Koppies furnace. Bits of slag were found near the furnaces, on large flat rocks with indentations in them that were used for grinding.

Near the furnace site is another area where pottery was manufactured, fenced like the furnace area. Half-way up the Koppie there are remnants of stone walls that would have been a kraal and living areas.
