= Lone Hill =

- Location within Gauteng Location within South Africa
- Coordinates: 26.012°S 28.027°E
- Country: South Africa
- Province: Gauteng
- Municipality: City of Johannesburg
- Main Place: Sandton

Area
  - Total: 5.09 km^{2} (1.97 sq mi)

Population (2011)
  - Total: 11,145
  - Density: 2,190/km^{2} (5,670/sq mi)

Racial makeup (2011)
  - Black African: 22.0%
  - Coloured: 2.0%
  - Indian/Asian: 5.6%
  - White: 68.3%
  - Other: 2.1%

First languages (2011)
  - English: 72.6%
  - Afrikaans: 11.1%
  - Zulu: 3.3%
  - Tswana: 1.9%
  - Other: 11.1%
- Time zone: UTC+2 (SAST)
- Postal code (street): 2191
- PO box: 2062
- Area code: 011

Lone Hill is a suburb north of Johannesburg, South Africa. It is located in Region E. Lone Hill is in the Gauteng province and is a suburb in Sandton.

Lone Hill is an upmarket area mostly composed of residential properties.

It is named after Lonehill. Councilor is Vino Reddy from the Democratic Alliance.

== Amenities ==
- Lonehill Shopping Center
- Leaping Frog Shopping Center
- Lone Hill Fire Department
- Lone Hill Park
- Lone Hill Municipal Nature Reserve (with views over the suburb)
- Lonehill Academy
