= Amor Vittone =

South African singer (born 1972)

- Born: Amor Ines Vittone; 16 March 1972 (age 54); Johannesburg
- Origin: South Africa
- Genres: Afrikaans / English / pop
- Years active: 1998–present
- Website: www.amor.co.za

Amor Vittone (born 16 March 1972 as Amor Ines Vittone) is a South African singer.

== Biography ==
Amor Vittone was born March 16, 1972, in Johannesburg, Gauteng Province, South Africa. She was head girl at her high school, where she excelled both in sport and academically. She completed her Honours degree in communication (cum laude) at the Rand Afrikaans University and is a former Miss Johannesburg.

Vittone won the South African Modern and Tap Dance championships for seven consecutive years. She has been in productions of West Side Story at the State Theatre in Pretoria, as well as Richard Loring's production of Girl Talk. In addition, she has presented or hosted the following programmes on national television:

- "Legkaart Bonanza"
- "Junior Topsport"
- M-Net's "Spot-on"
- "Mainly for Men" on e.tv
- "Road to Riches" and the National Lottery draw on SABC2
- "Top Billing"
- "In die kryt met Joost en Amor" on KykNET and M-Net
- "ABSA Game Show" on SABC 3
- "Verimark Quiz Show" on M-Net

Vittone is at present a choreographer, MC, motivational speaker and singer. She has featured on numerous South African magazines’ front pages. These include "Fair Lady." "Keur." "Huisgenoot," "You," "Sarie," "Finesse," "FHM," "Insig," "Vroue Keur," "De Kat," "Tydskrif Rapport," "Sunday Times Magazine," "Personality," "Directions," "Longevity," "Rooi Rose," "Die Lig," "Baba en Kleuter," and "Marie Claire."

== Music ==
Vittone's debut album, Wild Cherry Kisses, was released in 1998 through EMI. It was followed up with Dance in Colours and Young Forever. In February 2005 her fourth album, Amor, was released by Gallo Music Record Company. Her first Afrikaans album, Voluit was released in September 2006 by Select Music.

Voluit reached gold status within six months (more than 20,000 units sold) and Vittone was nominated for a South African Music Association award in the category Beste Afrikaanse Popalbum. She was the only female artist to be nominated in this category. The video of "Voluit Lewe" also received an accolade for the best Afrikaans DVD in May 2007 during the Afrikaans music awards ceremony in South Africa. Vittone was also nominated for a "Crystal" award in the category "Hottest S.A. Artist" during June 2007.

At the "Huisgenoot Tempo-toekennings", Vittone was nominated in the category favourite female artist and "Voluit Lewe" was nominated as favourite song of the year. At the Vonk Afrikaans music awards, she was nominated as best female artist of 2007.

"Glo altyd aan more" was released in September 2009.

Amor will be releasing her new single on 7 November 2025 titled "My lig skyn helder"under the IBE music Label.

== Personal life ==
Vittone married former Springbok rugby captain Joost van der Westhuizen on 20 October 2002. They had a son and a daughter together, and were voted South Africa's most popular couple at the Starin-U Kids Awards in 2004. Vittone and van der Westhuizen were described as "South Africa's own Posh and Becks", but separated in 2008.

== Discography ==
- Die Tyd is nou (2015)
- Grootste Treffers (2011)
- Glo Altyd aan Môre (2009)
- This Was Then : Amor Greatest Hits (2009, EMI)
- Voluit (2006, SELECT)
- Surrender (2005)
- Amor (2004, RPM)
- Young Forever (2002, EMI)
- Dance in Colours (2000)
- Wild Cherry Kisses (1999, EMI)
