= Harold Le Roith =

South African architect (1905–1995)

- Born: 24 March 1905; Grahamstown, South Africa
- Died: 4 July 1995 (aged 90)
- Education: Rhodes University; University of the Witwatersrand
- Spouse: Lilian Greenfield (1939-1995)
- Parent(s): Samuel Radomsky and Rachel Le Roith

Harold "Harry" Hirsch Le Roith (24 March 1905 – 4 July 1995) was a South African architect. He was a key figure in modern architecture in South Africa in the twentieth century. He is mostly known for designing residential buildings and synagogues in Johannesburg. His notable designs include Radoma Court and Temple Emanuel.

== Early life ==
Tomkin was born in Grahamstown in the Eastern Cape in 1905 to Jewish immigrant parents from the Russian Empire (present day Ukraine). He attended Victoria High School (later known as Graeme College). He then enrolled in a 1-year art and architecture course at Rhodes University between 1928 and 1929. He went on to study architecture at the University of the Witwatersrand in Johannesburg, where he graduated in 1935 with a Bachelor Bachelor of Architecture. His thesis focus was "Design and development of a theatre". He was influenced by Rex Distin Martienssen and this ultimately led to his interest in Le Corbusier.

== Career ==
Le Roith set up an architectural practice in 1935 in Johannesburg. He initially designed factories and commercial buildings such as Steel & Barnett's furniture factory in Johannesburg (1935).

In 1937 he designed his first apartment block, Radoma Court in Bellevue, an inner-city neighbourhood of Johannesburg, with design assistance from an architectural student, Kurt Jonas. The building's design was regarded as "highly avant-garde". In the same year he designed the San Remo apartment building in Yeoville, it was distinct for its curved staircase and porthole windows. In 1939 he designed the luxury apartment building, Dunkeld Mansions in Illovo.

His synagogue architecture was also notable. In the 1940s he designed Temple Emeth (later Temple Emet), a Reform synagogue in Springs. He designed two more Reform synagogues in Johannesburg, with Temple Shalom (1950) on Louis Botha Avenue in Highlands North and Temple Emanuel in Parktown in 1954. In 1966 he designed a Jewish wall of remembrance at Westpark Cemetery.

In 1953, two of his buildings were featured in the influential British magazine, The Architectural Review. The magazine featured photographs of Marlene Mansions in Berea and Cranbrook Hotel, a seven-storey residential hotel in Hillbrow.

In 1964, he purchased one hundred acres in what became Benmore Gardens, an area of Sandton. He was to work with the architect Richard Neutra on realising a project to build a self-contained village centre with apartments, shops and offices. The project was inspired by Le Roith's visit to Tapiola, a newly constructed town in Finland. Le Roith pulled out of the project after the completion of two apartment blocks.

He sought to "green" the inner-city neighbourhood of Hillbrow by introducing pavement gardens and planting to Golden Oaks, an apartment building he designed in 1976.

== Personal life ==
In 1939 he married Lilian Greenfield. He was very involved in Reform Judaism in Johannesburg and took on leadership positions.

He died at the age of 90 on 4 July 1995.
