= Kurt Jonas =

South African architect (1914–1942)

- Born: 1914; Johannesburg, Union of South Africa
- Died: 1942 (aged 27–28); Jerusalem, Mandatory Palestine
- Citizenship: South Africa; Germany
- Education: Royal Friedrich Wilhelm University of Berlin; University of the Witwatersrand; Hebrew University of Jerusalem
- Employer: Harold Le Roith

Kurt Jonas (1914–1942) was a German-South African architect. As a disciple of Modernist architecture, he was part of what Le Corbusier termed Le Groupe Transvaal, together with Harold Le Roith, Rex Distin Martienssen, John Fassler, Bernard Cooke, Duncan Howie, Monte Bryer and Roy Kantorowich. According to the architect and architectural historian, Clive Chipkin, Jonas was "aware of the need that the new architecture and fundamental social change in South Africa should be complimentary."

== Early life ==
Jonas was born in Johannesburg in the Union of South Africa in 1914 to a German Jewish migrant parents. The family returned to Germany in 1918 and Jonas studied at the Lessing-Gymnasium in Frankfurt. He studied classics and later economics and law at the Royal Friedrich Wilhelm University of Berlin in Berlin. He returned with his family to South Africa in 1934 in the wake of Adolf Hitler's rise to power in Germany. In the same year he enrolled to study a Bachelor of Architecture at the University of the Witwatersrand in Johannesburg. Jonas later told Rusty Bernstein and Jock Isacowitz that he had been subject to antisemitism in Germany.

== Career ==
As a fourth year student in the architecture school, he began to work for the architectural practice of Harold Le Roith. Their notable collaboration was the Modernist apartment building Radoma Court in Bellevue, an inner-city neighbourhood of Johannesburg. Jonas contributed design drawings to the project.

He was also chairman of the University of the Witwatersrand's Architectural Society. In 1937 he led the society's Congress and Exhibition of Abstract Art, which sought to "establish unity among all the arts, including architecture, in terms of an abstract aesthetic." In 1938 he organised the Town Planning Congress, with students creating designs for a model black township of 20, 000 residents. As part of the congress, Jonas and his student counterparts in Le Groupe Transvaal presented designs for a new business centre in Cape Town. On the back of the model township exhibition, he collaborated on a thesis with Roy Kantorowich, Paul Harold Connell, Charles Irvine-Smith and Frans J. Wepener for a "high-rise" black township set in parklands.

In addition he lectured at the university, providing extramural lectures on Marxism and public culture. He acted as a political mentor to his other students and was able to share his knowledge of housing rights, which he had studied in Berlin. Rusty Bernstein, an architecture student and later anti-apartheid activist, first learned through Jonas of "the invisible world of black workers and trade unions which existed on my own doorstep." Jonas had also belonged to the Zionist Socialist Party in South Africa, previously known as Tzeirei Zion.

In 1941 he moved to Jerusalem in Mandatory Palestine to study at the Hebrew University of Jerusalem. In August 1941, the Zionist Socialist Party held a reception in his honour, before his departure.

In 1942 he was awarded a South African government postgraduate research scholarship. He also published scholarly articles for the South African Architectural Record. An article for the record was quoted by Ayn Rand in her journal entry written on 7 December 1937.

== Death ==
Jonas died at the age of 27 from a long illness in Jerusalem, Mandatory Palestine (present-day Israel) in 1942.
