= Temple Shalom =

Temple Shalom may refer to:

- Temple Shalom (Johannesburg)
- Temple Shalom of Northwest Arkansas
- Temple Shalom (Wheeling, West Virginia)

== See also ==
- Temple Sholom, Chicago
- Peninsula Temple Sholom
