= Torch Commando =

South African anti-apartheid World War II veterans organisation

- Formation: 1951
- Origins: Springbok Legion
- President: Sailor Malan

The Torch Commando was a South African anti-apartheid organisation, born out of the work of the Springbok Legion, a South African organisation of World War II veterans, founded in 1941 during the Second World War, and the War Veterans Action Committee established with the involvement of Springbok Legionnaires to appeal to a broader base of ex-servicemen.

It was underwritten by Harry Oppenheimer, through an opaque trust fund.

The Springbok Legion was initially formed by members of the 9th Recce Battalion of the South African Tank Corps, the Soldiers Interests Committee formed by members of the First South African Brigade in Addis Ababa, and the Union of Soldiers formed by the same brigade in Egypt.

The aims and objectives of the Springbok Legion were enunciated in its 'Soldiers Manifesto'. The Springbok Legion was open to all service personnel regardless of race or gender and was avowedly anti-fascist and anti-racist. Amongst its leading members were servicemen such as Joe Slovo, Lionel Bernstein, Wolfie Kodesh, Jack Hodgson and Fred Carneson who all later joined the African National Congress and its military wing Umkhonto we Sizwe under the command of Nelson Mandela. Others such as Harry Schwarz, a later well-known anti-apartheid political leader, lawyer and ambassador to the United States during the first government of national unity was one of the organisation's founders. Another member was General Kenneth van der Spuy, one of the founding members of the South African Air Force who fought in both World War I and World War II and was captured and imprisoned in the Kremlin by the Russians after fighting alongside the White Russian forces against the communists and held until 1920.

The Torch Commando was founded in 1951 during the Coloured vote constitutional crisis, in protest against the South African government's plan to remove Coloureds from the voters roll in the Cape Province. At a time when the Springbok Legion's numbers were diminishing, the Torch Commando strategy gave a new lease of life to the aims and objectives of the Springbok Legion, perceived as being too left wing by some, and gave a home to whites in other liberal formations including liberals in the United Party, who identified with black grievances.

The wartime RAF fighter ace Group Captain Adolph Sailor Malan became the president of the 'Torch Commando'. The commando's main activities were torchlight marches, from which they took their name. The largest march attracted 75,000 protesters.

The Torch Commando existed for more than five years, and at its height claimed to have had 250,000 members. The government was alarmed by the number of judges, public servants and military officers joining the organisation, and a new law was passed to ban anyone in public service or the military from joining. Subsequently the National Party did everything to purge the memory of the Springbok Legion, Torch Commando and men such as 'Sailor' Malan, who had appeal with white Afrikaner youth.
