= Military history of South Africa during World War I =

South Africa's participation in the First World War occurred automatically when the British Government declared war on Germany in August 1914. Due to her status as a Dominion within the British Empire, South Africa, whilst having significant levels of self-autonomy, did not have the legal power to exercise an independent foreign policy and was tied to the British declaration.

Union between the British colonies and former Boer republics in Southern Africa had occurred just four years earlier, and South Africa did yet not possess a singular national identity nor united population. The years of peace following the Second Boer War (1899-1902) had not healed the deep and traumatic ethnic divisions between English-speakers and Afrikaners, whilst non-white racial groups increasingly found legalised discrimination being used against them for the benefit of whites.

The declaration of war was met with a wide variety of public opinion. Predominantly, English-speaking whites of typically of British descent were largely enthusiastic and strongly backed the mother country, volunteering in their tens of thousands. A minority of pro-republican Afrikaners, outraged by British influence over South Africa affairs, staged an armed rebellion against the Government in an attempt to establish an independent South Africa outside of the British Empire. Black South Africans were largely apathetic to the declaration of war. Although barred by racial legislation from being allowed to carry weapons, many still joined the National Labour Service, with thousands being deployed to France as non-combatants. Whilst some saw it as a purely 'white man's war', others were convinced that loyalty to the British Crown would be rewarded, and that political and economic freedoms would be granted once the war had been won by a grateful government. The South African Native National Congress, the forerunner of the African National Congress, publicly announced the cessation of law action against the government, pledging complete national support for the war effort.

Between 1914 and 1918, over 250,000 South Africans of all races, from a population of 6 million, volunteered to serve the Allied cause. Thousands more enlisted in the British Army directly, with over 3,000 joining the British Royal Flying Corps. More than 146,000 Whites, 83,000 Blacks, and 2,500 Coloureds and Indians fought in either German South West Africa, East Africa, the Middle East, or in Europe on the Western Front. Over 7,000 South Africans were killed, and 12,000 wounded, with eight South Africans being awarded the Victoria Cross. Two events have since become part of the nation's consciousness, and are still commemorated today - the Battle of Delville Wood and the sinking of the troopship SS Mendi.

== Outbreak of war ==
Following the British declaration of war against Germany on 4 August 1914, South Africa consequently was part of the conflict due to her status as a dominion within the British Empire. Although with significant levels of self-government, South Africa, along with other dominions such as Australia, New Zealand, and Canada, did not have the legal right to exercise an autonomous foreign policy separate to that of the United Kingdom.

It was seen by South African Prime Minister Louis Botha that the war offered an opportunity for territorial expansion, and that South Africa could possibly incorporate the small neighbouring colonies of Basutoland (Lesotho), Bechuanaland (Botswana) and Swaziland into the Union. German South-West Africa similarly proved a tempting aspiration. Defence Minister General Jan Smuts even mooted plans that should German East Africa be occupied, the territory could be used in negotiations with the Portuguese in exchange for the southern half of Mozambique. Such an agreement would allow the industrial region of the Transvaal to utilise the more immediate and adjacent ports of Beira and Lourenco Marques (Maputo) rather than Durban.

Although Britain refused to cede colonies to South Africa, and was equally reluctant to discuss any post-war territorial claims, Prime Minister Botha and General Smuts quickly became trusted and energetic members of the British Imperial War Cabinet. It was soon agreed with London that South Africa was able to adequately defend herself, and that British garrison forces could be withdrawn to fight in Europe. Further discussions acknowledged that South Africa would be well placed to mount an invasion of German South-West Africa, particularly to seize key naval installations and wireless communication centres.

== South African politics and African nationalism ==
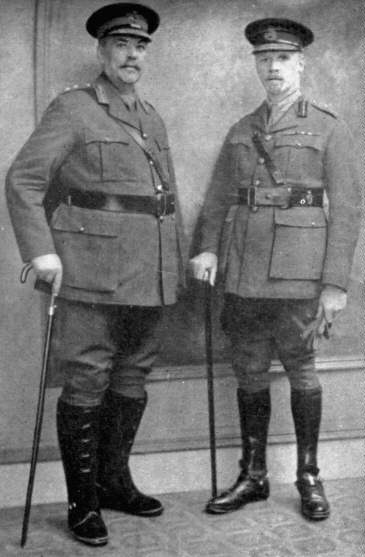
Prime Minister Louis Botha and Jan Smuts in British Uniform, 1917

After the establishment of the Union, the first South African government was formed by the South African Party (SAP) which won 67 of the 121 parliamentary seats available in the 1910 election. Led by the former Boer veteran Louis Botha, the SAP pursued a reconciliatory relationship with Britain, was favourable to South Africa being a self-governing Dominion within the Empire, and was generally supported by moderates from both ethnicities (Afrikaner and English speakers). In the immediate years before the First World War, South Africa routinely used force to suppress both black and white labour unrest, particularly in the economically vital mining industry. As Minister of Mines, Jan Smuts in July 1913 deployed troops to quell a strike of over 18,000 white workers. After requesting Police, Mounted Riflemen, and even British garrison forces, the strike escalated into a wider industrial riot and then a quasi-uprising against the Government. With increased violence and deaths being reported in Johannesburg, martial law was declared after public property was destroyed and troops responded with live fire. More than 20 people were killed and fears were so great that it was thought that Johannesburg, and critical mining infrastructure, would be completely destroyed. Botha and Smuts hurried from Pretoria to negotiate with the strikers directly, and although Smuts despised the agreement that stated workers grievances would be investigated and those dismissed would be reinstated, he eventually signed after being informed that government troops were beginning to lose control. Later in 1913, the South African Mounted Rifles were again deployed to persuade Mahatma Gandhi into calling off an Indian led strike in Natal. When another general strike occurred the following year in January 1914, Smuts, who was determined not to concede again, crushed the walkout with over 10,000 troops, with the use machine guns and artillery.

By the end of 1914, disillusioned Afrikaners increasingly resented the support that South Africa gave the British Empire during the First World War, as well the perception that Afrikaner culture was being neglected and should develop separately from English-speakers. They were influenced by recent memories of the Second Boer War, in which the Boer Republics fought against Britain to retain their independence. J.B.M. Hertzog, another Boer veteran and former Minister of Justice under Botha, formed the National Party (NP) which gained 20 seats in the 1915 October election, forcing the SAP to become a minority government for the rest of the war, relying on parliamentary support from the pro-British Natal based Unionist Party.

In 1912, the South African Native National Congress, later renamed the African National Congress, was founded in Bloemfontein as an organisation that could defend and advance black rights and freedoms on a national scale. As the first western-styled African political organisation, the founding members, who themselves were members of the elite and saw themselves as gentlemen, almost exclusively undertook legal campaigns against racial discrimination. In August 1914, the SANNC temporarily suspended its campaign against the Natives Land Act (which banned Africans from purchasing land outside the reserves) and declared nationwide support for the war effort.

A SANNC delegation that was already in London, as well as sympathetic newspapers, proposed that black Africans could volunteer to fight for South Africa in exchange for an improvement in civil rights. Denied permission to carry weapons, the SANNC supported the creation of the unarmed South African Native Labour Corps as a way to participate in the war and serve South Africa. Similarly, the African Political Organisation (APO), which was also founded in 1912 to promote Coloured people, had organised over 10,000 potential volunteers as early as December 1914. In 1918 the SANNC sent a petition to King George V highlighting black contributions to the war effort and requesting equality. Although the Coloured, Indian, and black establishment had hoped that enthusiastic and genuine support for the war would be an opportunity to gain equal status, they were to be left bitterly disappointed as they went unrewarded and civil rights continued to be denied after the Treaty of Versailles.

== Union Defence Force ==
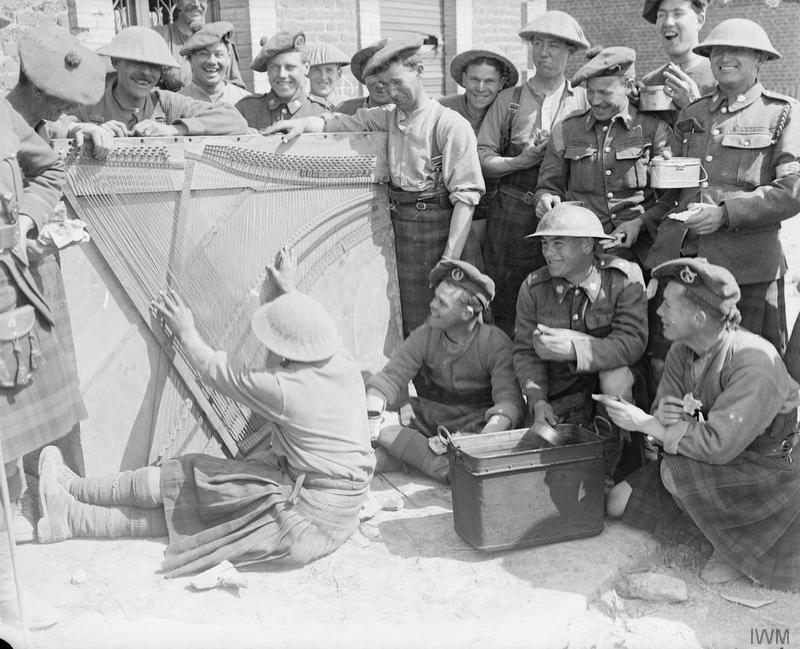
Troops of the 4th South African Regiment (South African Scottish) during a rest period at Blangy, France. 3 May 1917

After the formation of the Union of South Africa, in 1910, Jan Smuts placed a high priority on establishing a unified military force that would be responsible for national defence. The Defence Act (No. 13) of 1912 saw the creation of the Union Defence Force (UDF), which was made up of a Permanent Force of career soldiers, an Active Citizen Force of conscripts and volunteers, as well as a Cadet force. It was not considered financially or practically realistic at this time for South Africa to undertake naval responsibility as well, and continued to rely on the Royal Navy for protection. Although the UDF had been intended to blend British and Boer military traditions together, the reality saw the organisation draw heavily on British tradition and alienated Afrikaners by favouring the English language and culture.

Due to South Africa's attitudes towards racial segregation at the time, only White South Africans were allowed to be armed and serve in combat roles due to fears that a multi-racial army would undermine racial separation in wider South African society at home. In peacetime all white males aged between 17 and 25 were eligible for compulsory military service, although only around half were chosen for call up by the use of a lottery system. Compulsory cadet training was organised for white males between the ages of 13 and 17, and a General Reserve of local rifle associations and former Boer commandos was also developed.

At the outbreak of the First World War, the Union Defence Force of South Africa consisted of the small, but professional, Permanent Force of 2,500 South African Mounted Riflemen in five regiments with artillery sections, alongside an Active Citizen Force of nearly 23,000 conscripts and volunteers. Due to the perceived political sensitivity within South Africa regarding Afrikaner loyalty to the Empire, enforced conscription would never be enacted during the war.

As the war progressed and casualties mounted, in September 1915 the Government changed slightly from its strict racial principals and decided to raise infantry battalions for Cape Coloured men wishing to serve. Open from 25 October 1915, the first recruitment station at City Hall in Cape Town was so overwhelmed with applicants that it later required police assistance to control the crowd. Recruiting stations were later opened in Stellenbosch, Worcester, Port Elizabeth, Kimberley to name a few, all with similar levels of high interest by the Coloured population. The Cape Corps was generally expected to undertake non-combatant roles such as transport, pioneers, and guard details.

In 1916, the Government responded to British requests for manual workers to help operate French infrastructure due to a severe labour shortage by establishing the South African Native Labour Corps (SANLC). Open to black South Africans, there was large scale opposition from many sections of South African society, including black opposition itself. Although paid around 10% more a month than average labourers, sections of the black population feared that the man's absence might make it easier for his family to be evicted at home. Meanwhile, white society feared the loss of cheap labour and the effect that exposure to Europe and liberal ideas politics would have on the attitudes of the black population once they to South Africa returned. Nevertheless, the SANLC went on to recruit 25,000 men, with 21,000 being transported for duties in France.

== Maritz Rebellion ==
As the South African War had ended just twelve years previously in 1902, and with the memories of the suffering experienced by some Afrikaners in British concentration camps still fresh, there was a significant level of opposition against the declaration of war in support of Britain. Known as the Martiz Rebellion, or the Boer Revolt, around 12,000 Afrikaners undertook an armed insurrection against the South African Government in October 1914 after refusing to invade German South-West Africa.

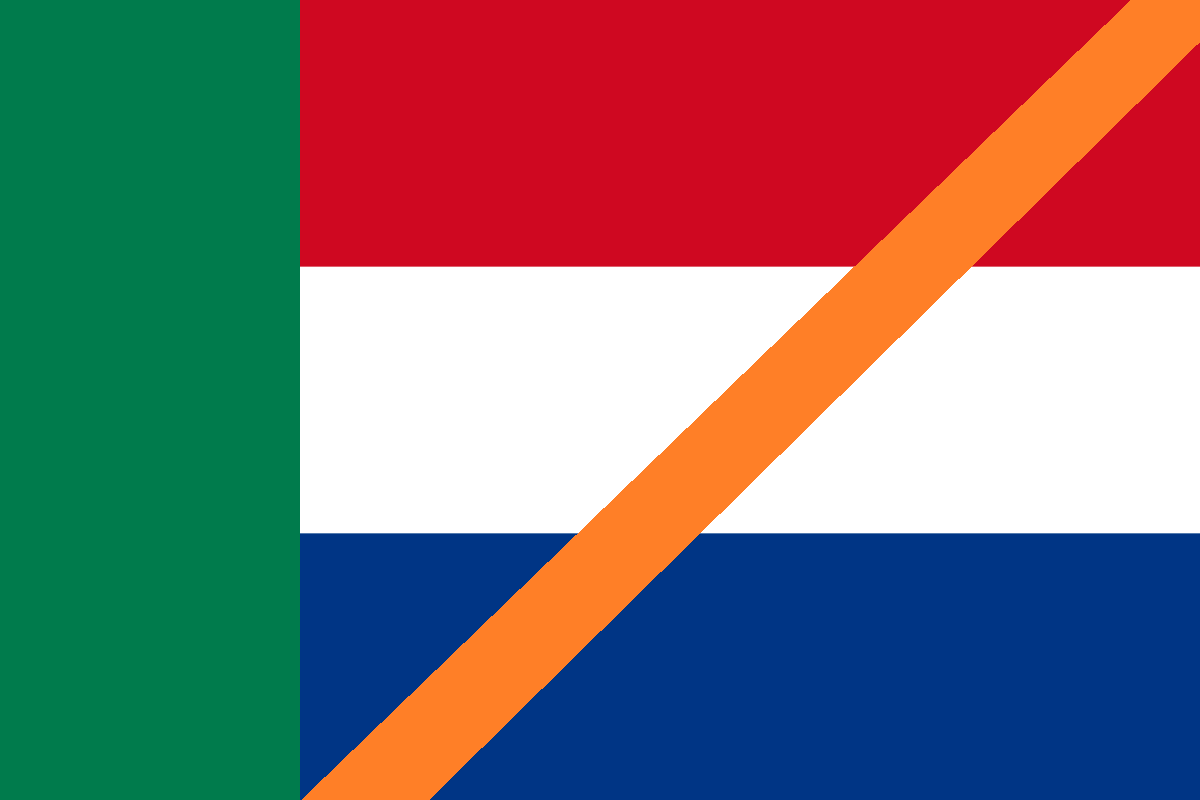
Flag of the Maritz Rebellion, 1914

Nationalist republicans such as C.F. Beyers, Christiaan de Wet, Jan Kemp, and Manie Maritz, including many other senior military officers had resigned their commissions and gathered around the 'Boer prophet' Nicolaas van Rensburg. During an attempted military coup on 15 September 1914, Koos de la Rey, a famous Boer military commander, was shot and killed after his car failed to stop at a police checkpoint. A further military coup took place a month later after a military force, led by Manie Maritz, refused to advance his column into German South-West Africa, leaving the second column dangerously exposed. After disarming loyalist soldiers, Maritz declared South Africa to be independent and opened communications the Germans.

By late October, over 12,000 armed Boer rebels had been recruited and had gone on to occupy local towns, launching uncoordinated attacks on trains. Rejecting outside British or Imperial assistance, Botha decided to confront the rebellion with his own force of 32,000 loyalists, who were mostly Afrikaners themselves. In the Orange Free State at Winburg, 5,000 rebels under de Wet were encircled and later surrendered on 12 November. Shortly after, loyalist forces routed Beyers at Bultfontein where he himself drowned after trying to escape over the Vaal River. By December 1914, the rebellion had been effectively crushed within South Africa. Kemp and several hundred rebels had fled across the Kalahari Desert, riding over 800 miles, into German territory where they were warmly welcomed and joined with Maritz.

Over 1,000 people were killed or wounded during the rebellion, however, Prime Minister Botha encouraged national reconciliation and often showed mercy. Of the 239 rebels that faced trial, only around 50 remained in prison by the end of 1915. Van Rensburg received an 18-month sentence, Kemp served a year and nine months out of seven years, and de Wet served six months of his six-year sentence. Maritz had initially fled to Angola before returning to South Africa to serve three years. Only Jopie Fourie, a rebel who had not resigned his military commission, was executed for treason. English-speaking whites considered the sentences scandalous and far too lenient. Black leaders of emerging political organisations noticed the double standard in comparison to the harsh justice handed to the rebels of the Zulu Rebellion in 1906. Afrikaner nationalists continued to celebrate the rebels well into the 20th Century, and in August 1915, 7,000 Afrikaner women marched in Pretoria to demand total amnesty.

== German South-West Africa Campaign (1914 - 1915) ==
On 7 August 1914, three days after the declaration of war, Britain requested that South African troops capture the three German wireless communication stations at Windhoek, Swakopmund and Luderitzbucht in German South-West Africa so as to isolate Germany further. With the South African-German border being mostly open desert and absent of water, this difficult terrain allowed the German colonial forces, numbering around 3,000 regular Schutztruppe and 7,000 militia to deploy defensively along probable lines of attack. The first invasion attempt of the colony failed at the Battle of Sandfontein on 26 September 1914, with German troops inflicting heavy casualties on the advancing South Africans, however, later allowing survivors to escape without harm.

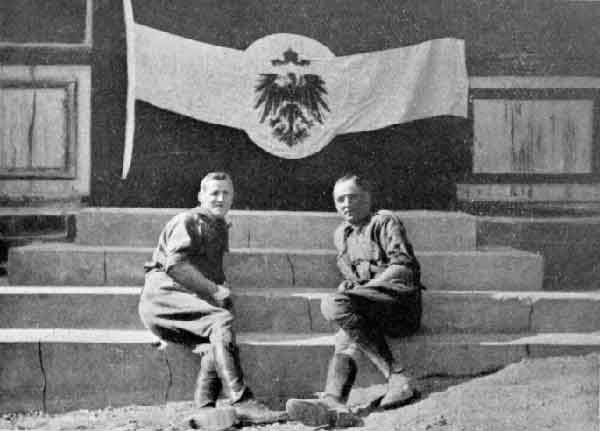
South African military officers pose with German flag at governor's residence, Windhoek - 1915

As a consequence of the Maritz Rebellion which caused a serious disruption within South Africa, German forces undertook a pre-emptive invasion alongside Boer rebels. In December 1914 a German offensive crossed the Orange River and threatened the South African town of Upington. After numerous disagreements between German and Boer commanders, a badly coordinated attack at Upington in January 1915 was repulsed by South African forces under Jacob van Deventer. A supporting German offensive was later halted and pushed back on 4 February 1915 at the Battle of Kakamas, a skirmish for control of two crossings over the Orange River.

As the home front became more secure, South African forces began to occupy German South-West Africa from March 1915. Prime Minister Botha personally took command of the northern invasion force that had landed at the coastal town of Swakopmund on 11 February. Advancing along the Swakop valley railway line, the northern force captured Otjimbinge, Karibib, Friedrichsfelde, Wilhelmsthal and Okahandja. On 5 May 1915 Botha occupied the colonial capital of Windhoek.

Despite German Colonial Forces offering terms of surrender after Windhoek fell, Botha rejected these calls and continued the offensive after dividing his force into four sections under Brits, Lukin, Manie Botha, and Myburgh. Brits marched north to the Etosha Pan which cut German interior forces from access to coastal regions, while the other three sections marched northeast roughly following the Swakopmund to Tsumeb railway line. Led by former Boer Commandos, the sections moved extremely swiftly despite the harsh landscape conditions. German forces had made a stand at the Battle of Otavi on 1 July, however, later surrendered at Khorab on 9 July 1915.

During these actions, General Smuts had landed with another South African force at the coastal town of Lüderitz and advanced inland. After capturing Keetmanshoop on 20 May, Smuts was met by two other South African columns that had pushed up from Port Nolloth and Kimberley. After marching along the railway line towards Beseba, Smuts captured the village of Gibeon on 26 May after two days fighting. German forces retreated north seeking support from Windhoek, unknown the settlement had fallen. When meeting General Botha after their arrival instead, they duly surrendered.

South Africa committed over 70,000 men to the campaign - 45,000 Whites and 33,000 African, Coloured, and Indian, armed volunteers that worked as general labour, drivers, and railway workers. Despite South African racial regulation, a Coloured armed scout detachment was formed by those familiar with the terrain. During the course of the campaign, South Africa lost 113 men with 263 wounded. Another 153 died of disease or accidents.

German Colonial Forces, although believed by Botha to be much larger than officially claimed, had a mixture of 3,000 mounted European infantry, and a reserve of over 3,000 volunteers supported by artillery, machine guns and three aircraft. Germany suffered over 1,000 casualties, with 103 killed. Around 4,000 soldiers surrendered, along with 37 field and 22 machine guns.

Although South Africa had desired to incorporate the territory into the Union officially, in 1919 the League of Nations granted only a Class C mandate to administer the colony until ready for self-government. Despite this, South-West Africa became a de facto 'fifth province', as well as having representation in the South African Parliament, until Namibian independence in 1990.

== South African Overseas Expeditionary Force ==
=== Organisation ===
The Union Defence Act of 1914 forbade the deployment of the UDF outside of South Africa and its immediate surrounding territories. In order to support the war effort on a wider scale, the separate South African Overseas Expeditionary Force (SAOEF) was established in July 1915. Formed with volunteers from the UDF, the SAOEF instead had the status of Imperial troops under British command, rather than as independent South African units. As there was no formal link between the UDF and the SAOEF, South African forces deployed overseas were not entitled to retain regimental colours awarded to them after battle.

=== German East Africa Campaign (1916-1918) ===
The East African Campaign was a series of battles and guerrilla actions which occurred in German East Africa, before spreading to areas within Portuguese Mozambique, Northern Rhodesia, British East Africa, the Uganda Protectorate and the Belgian Congo. Britain was keen to deny the merchant raiders of the Imperial German Navy facilities on the Indian Ocean coast, as well as denying a base where German land forces could conduct cross border raids into neighbouring British or Allied colonies. After a disastrous British Indian Army amphibious landing in November 1914 at Tanga, South Africa was requested by Britain to lead the campaign, defeat General Paul von Lettow-Vorbeck, and occupy German East Africa.

The 1st and 2nd SA Mounted Brigades, the 2nd and 3rd SA Infantry Brigades, SA Field Artillery, and the Cape Corps fought in Imperial operations against German forces in German East Africa (now Tanzania) from January 1916 until the war in Africa ended on 25 November 1918. Two South African generals, Lt. Gen. Jan Smuts and Lt. Gen. Sir Jacob van Deventer, commanded the operations. Their major battles were: Salaita Hill, Kilimanjaro, and Kondoa-Irangi in 1916; and Behobeho, Narungombe, and Nyangao in 1917. Captain William Anderson Bloomfield won the Victoria Cross for gallantry.

=== Egypt Campaign (1916) ===
In the summer of 1915, the Ottoman Empire persuaded the Grand Senussi Ahmed Sharif, who held lands in formerly Ottoman Libya, to invade British-occupied Egypt from the west and encourage mass insurrection in support of the Ottoman offensive against the Suez Canal in the east.

The 1st SA Infantry Brigade was deployed in British operations against the Sanusi in Egypt from January to March 1916. It fought in the action of Halazin and the action of Agagiya.

=== Western Front Campaign (1916–1918) ===
From April 1916 until the war in Europe ended on 11 November 1918, South Africa fought alongside other Imperial and Allied nations at battles of the Somme in 1916; Arras, Ypres, and Menin in 1917; and Passchendaele, Messines, Mont Kemmel, and Cambrai in 1918. Two events of the campaign are still commemorated today and are a symbol of remembrance - the Battle of Delville Wood, and the sinking of the troopship SS Mendi. Two South Africans, Private William Frederick Faulds and Lance Corporal William Henry Hewitt, would also go on to win the Victoria Cross - the Empire's highest medal for gallantry.

Attached to the British 9th (Scottish) Division, the South African 1st Infantry Brigade was deployed to France in mid-April 1916 in anticipation of the upcoming Somme Offensive. Occupying front-line trenches throughout May, and then later in reserve, the Brigade reportedly gained a reputation for imitating Zulu war songs and dances when at the front.

=== Palestine Campaign (1918) ===
The SA Field Artillery and the Cape Corps fought in British operations against Turkish forces in Palestine from August 1917 until the end of the war in November 1918. They fought in the battles of Gaza, El Mughar, and Nebi Samwil in 1917; and Tel Asur, Battle of Megiddo 1918, Sharon, and Nablus in 1918.

=== Disbandment ===
The SAOEF units and formations were disbanded in 1919. As there were no formal links between SAOEF units and the Union Defence Forces units which had provided their initial manpower, the SAOEF's war record, including its many honours, was not perpetuated by the UDF (except for the Cape Corps battle honours, which were allowed to the SA Cape Corps Service Battalion formed in 1973).

A Demobilisation Board and over 50 'Returned Soldiers Committees' were established to help reintegrate white servicemen back into civilian life. Many returned to jobs that had been reserved by their employers, whilst others joined the Allied Expeditionary Force in Russia that was fighting the Bolsheviks, and some became part of the radical mineworkers' movement that led the Rand Rebellion in 1922. Due to South African racial policies, employment support and official gratitude was never given to the Coloured, Black and Indian racial groups that had served.

== South African Aviation Corps (SAAC) ==
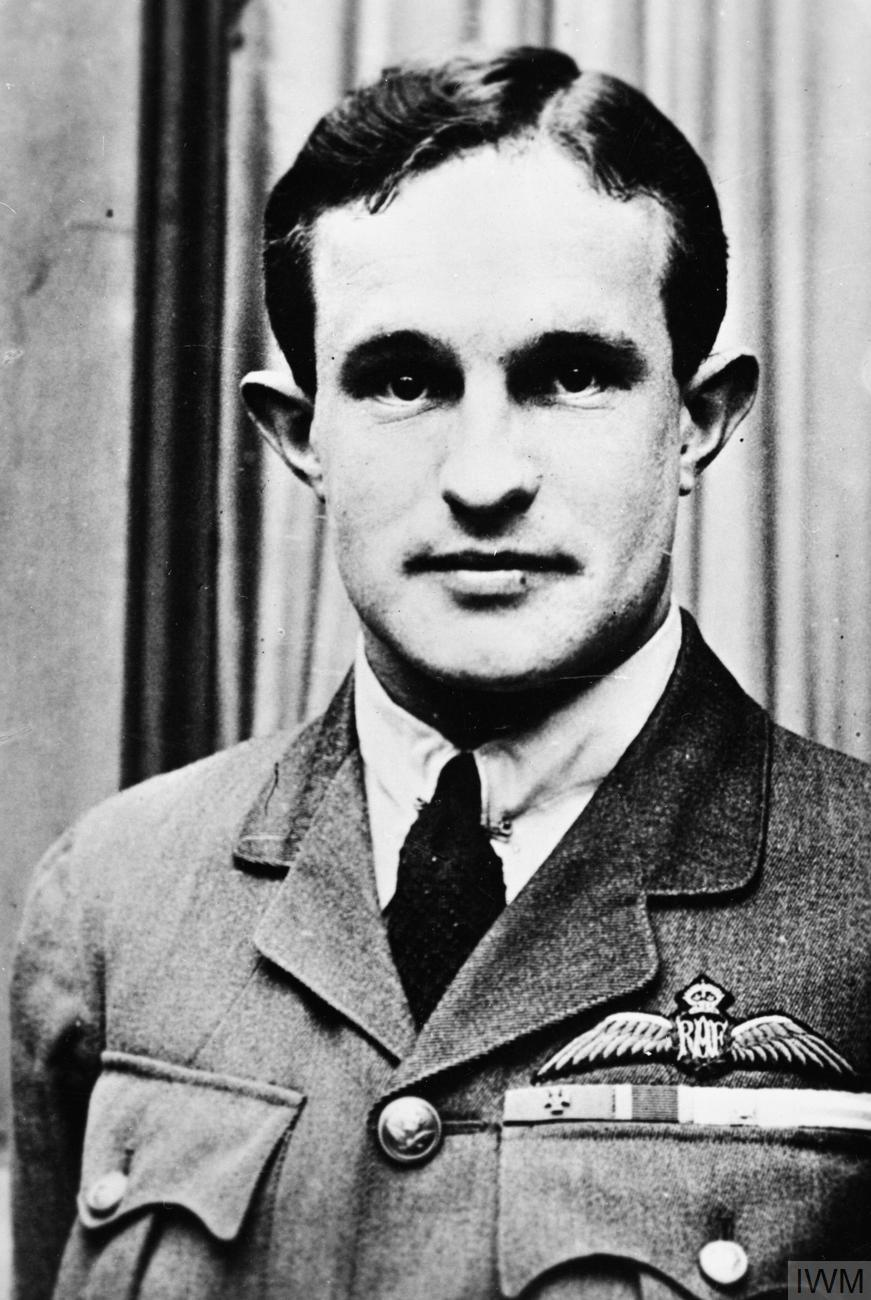
Andrew Beauchamp-Proctor VC, South Africa's highest-scoring fighter ace during the First World War

As early as 1912, the Union Defence Force established a flying school at Alexandersfontein, near Kimberley, to train pilots for the proposed South African Aviation Corps (SAAC). South Africa's first military pilot was Kenneth van der Spuy who qualified on 2 June 1914, with four others following him days later.

Soon after the outbreak of war, the need for airpower in Southern Africa became acute after German reconnaissance aircraft were routinely spotted, and advancing South African columns in German South-West Africa attacked by hostile aircraft. On 29 January 1915, the South African Aviation Corp at long last became operational and was initially equipped with twelve steel-framed French Henri Farman F-27 aircraft. Issues over the use of wooden aircraft from Britain and the USA had dictated the need to buy French due to the concerns of wooden planes in the hot dry climate of Southern Africa.

Airfield construction was soon undertaken at Walvis Bay (then a South African enclave in German South-West Africa), and recruitment expanded to 75 prospective pilots. By the end of June the SAAC possessed six Henri Farman's and two British B.E.2c's along with three extra Royal Flying Corps pilots. From their first operational airfield at Karabib in South West Africa, the SAAC flew reconnaissance, leaflet dropping and improvised bombing missions against German forces.

Soon after the South West African campaign had ended, an independent squadron of mixed British and South African pilots was stood up and deployed to support operations in East Africa. No. 26 Squadron (also known as 'The South African Squadron"), had eight aircraft of an F-27 and B.E2c combination transported and later flown to a forward airfield inside German East Africa at Mbuyuni. The independent squadron flew close reconnaissance and observer missions throughout the campaign until February 1918 when it was withdrawn to Cape Town and later disbanded on 8 July 1918.

Although the SAAC and the No. 26 Squadron was engaged in German South West Africa and East Africa, thousands of South Africans travelled to Britain and volunteered for service with the Royal Flying Corps directly. Over 3,000 men flew with the RFC in Europe, suffering 260 active-duty fatalities. Forty-six pilots became fighter aces, with Andrew Beauchamp-Proctor being the British Empire's fourth most successful ace with 54 confirmed victories.

Between 1918 and 1920, South African pilots took part in the Russian Civil War in Eastern Europe. In June 1918 the North Russian Expeditionary Force, which had a Royal Air Force detachment (previously the Royal Flying Corps and Royal Naval Air Service), disembarked at Murmansk. No. 47 Squadron RAF was commanded by South African Samuel Kinkead, and had a number of other South African pilots such as Kenneth van der Spuy and Pierre van Ryneveld.

== South African Navy ==
During the First World War, South Africa could offer a limited, but strategically important, naval contribution despite not operating any vessels of its own.

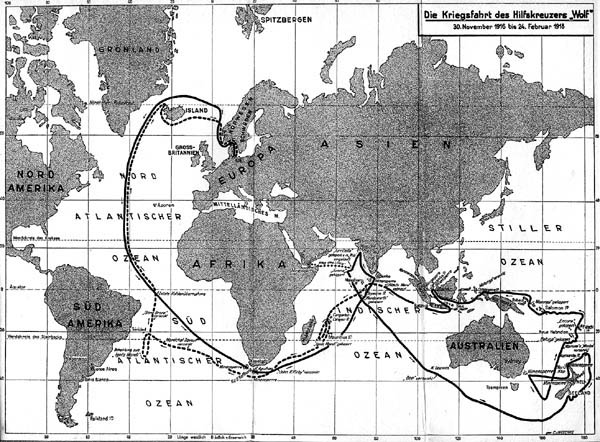
Map showing the course of SMS Wolf, a German armed merchant raider that took the war to the South African coast.

Under Royal Navy jurisdiction, the RNVR (SA) manned a small number of converted whalers and trawlers that patrolled the South African coast: defending port approaches, deterring German surface raiders, and engaging in local mine clearance - particularly in response to the operations of the highly successful raider SMS Wolf in 1917. The heaviest loss of life caused by Wolf was the sinking of the Spanish mail steamer SS Carlos de Eizaguirre which struck a mine off Cape Town on 26 May 1917, with 134 passengers and crew killed and 25 survivors.

A total of 412 South Africans served in the RNVR (SA) during the war, with 164 members volunteering for the Royal Navy directly. Many would see service in British and Mediterranean waters, whilst others participated in the support of the land campaigns of South West Africa and East Africa against German forces.

In conjunction with limited manpower contributions, South Africa offered to the Allies the crucial strategic position of controlling the Cape Sea Route - a key chokepoint in maritime trade and sea control.

Simon's Town Naval Base in the Cape was the principal operating base for the "Cape of Good Hope Station and West Africa Station" from where German trade could be intercepted and commerce raiders attacked. Similarly, Cape Town and Durban were equally important to the war effort. As rest stops, refuelling stations, and offering repair facilities, the Imperial sea lanes to the Middle East, the British Raj, and Australasia were kept open.

With the conclusion of hostilities in 1918, members of the RNVR(SA) were demobilised and all Admiralty requisitioned South African ships were promptly returned to their civilian owners.

== South African contributions and casualties ==
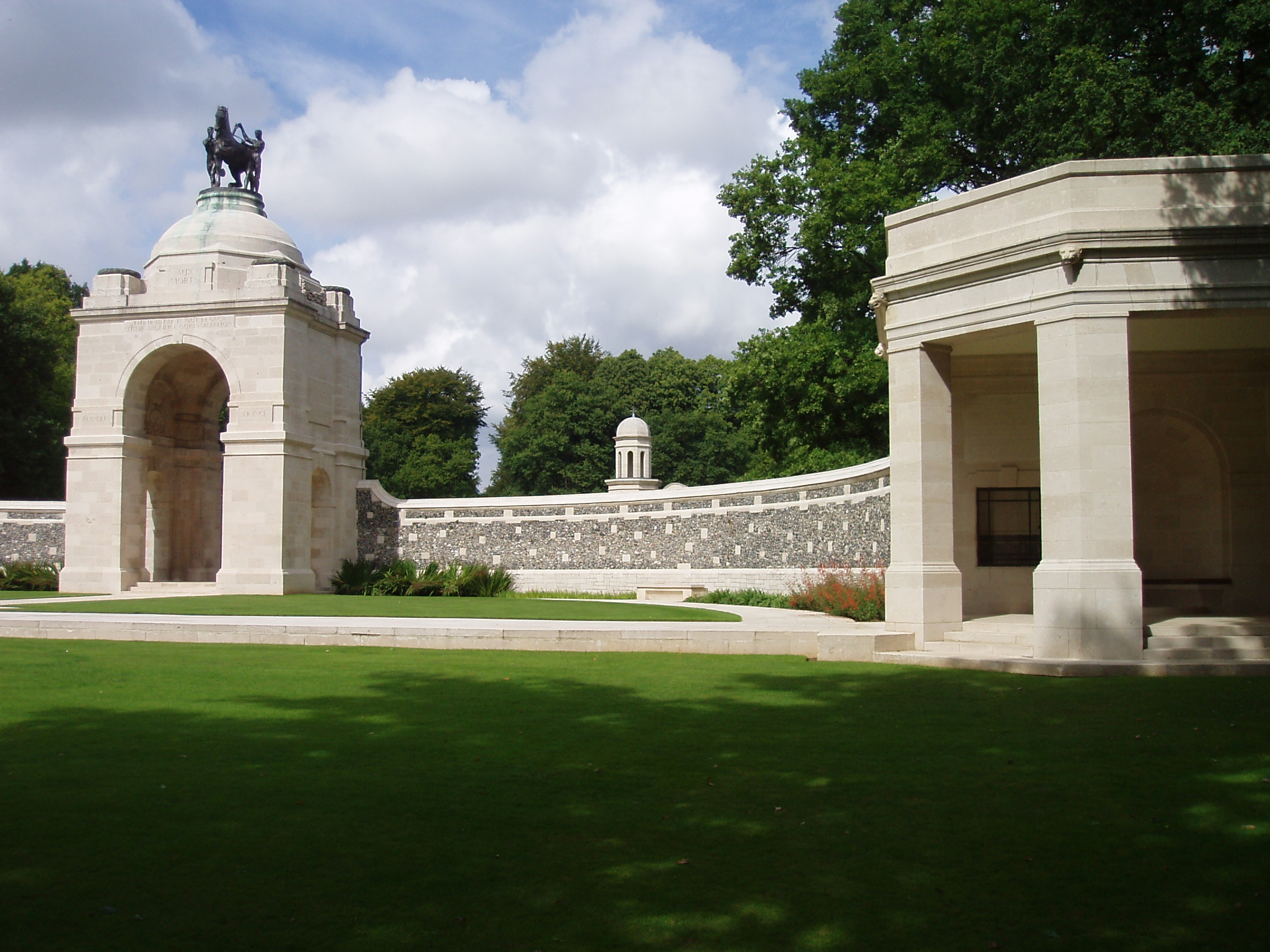
Delville Wood South African National Memorial, Longueval, France

With a population of roughly 6 million, between 1914 and 1918 over 250,000 South Africans of all races voluntarily served their country. Thousands more served in the British Army directly, with over 3,000 joining the British Royal Flying Corps and over 100 volunteering for the Royal Navy. It is likely that near 50% of white men of military age served during the war. More than 146,000 whites, 83,000 black Africans and 2,500 Coloureds and Asians served in either German South-West Africa, East Africa, the Middle East, or on the Western Front in Europe. Suffering roughly 19,000 casualties, over 7,000 South Africans were killed and nearly 12,000 were wounded during the course of the war. Eight South Africans won the Victoria Cross for gallantry, the Empire's highest and most prestigious military medal. The Battle of Delville Wood and the sinking of the SS Mendi being the greatest single incidents of loss of life.

The assistance that South Africa gave the British Empire was significant. Two German African colonies were occupied, either by South Africa alone or with significant South African assistance. Manpower, from all races, helped Allied operations not just on the Western Front and Africa, but also in the Middle East against the Ottoman Empire. South Africa's ports and infrastructure on the Home Front were a crucial strategic asset for war on a global scale. Providing important rest and refuelling stations, the Royal Navy could ensure vital sea lane connections to the British Raj and the Empire in the Far East stayed open.

Economically, South Africa supplied two-thirds of gold production in the British Empire, with most of the remainder coming from Australia. At the start of the war, Bank of England officials in London worked with South Africa to block gold shipments to Germany and force mine owners to sell only to the British Treasury, at prices set by the Treasury. This facilitated purchases of munitions and food from the United States and other neutral countries.
