= Radoma Court =

Coordinates: 26.1825°S 28.0655°E

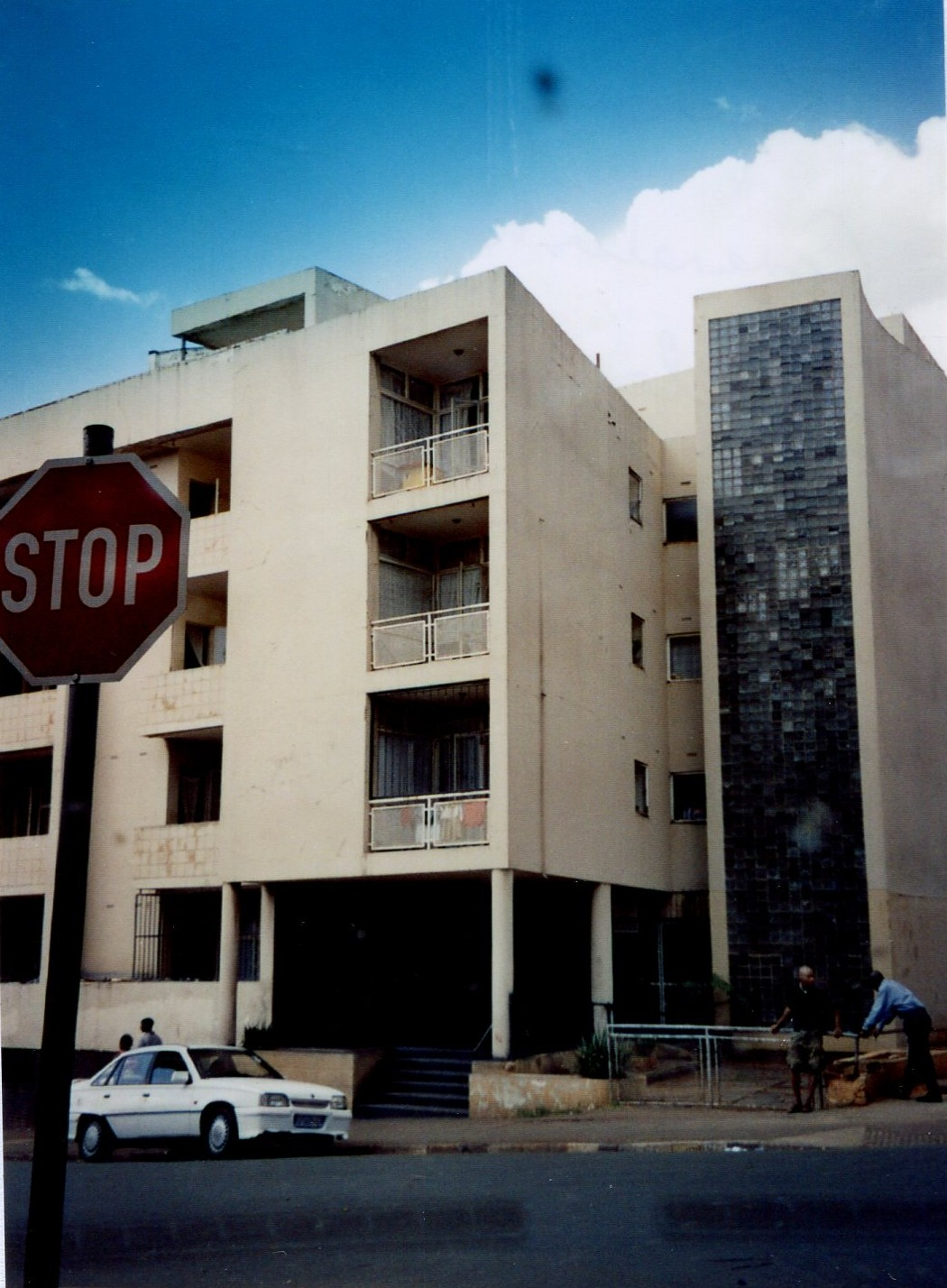
- Radoma Court, on the corner of Cavendish and Yeo Streets

General information
- Status: Completed
- Type: Apartments
- Location: Bellevue, Gauteng, South Africa
- Completed: 1937

Technical details
- Floor count: 4

Design and construction
- Architect(s): Harold Le Roith and Kurt Jonas

Radoma Court is an apartment block in Bellevue, an inner-city neighbourhood of Johannesburg, South Africa. Designed in 1937 by Harold Le Roith and his assistant Kurt Jonas, it is situated prominently on a corner site, at stand 474 where Cavendish and Yeo Streets meet.

At the time of construction, it was considered the most important block of flats in the international style of the modern movement. Clive Chipkin describes Radoma Court as "a stunning building" and it has gained iconic status.

A corner building, Radoma Court has its facade on the south and west boundaries of Cavendish and Yeo streets in Bellevue. It comprises 27 flats, of which 4 have two bedrooms and the rest are bachelor flats, and a basement parking garage. The building has been published both in South Africa and overseas and is regarded by student and architects as iconic.

== Design ==
Radoma Court occupies a corner site with street frontages on the south and west sides. This situation imposed difficult problems in orientation, out of which emerged the articulated plan and hence the lively three-dimensional composition of the building.

The main theme is the contrast between the sun-soaked west facade and the shaded southern elevation. On the south elevation, continuous banded windows are possible, while on the west, the necessity for protection has resulted in a deeply recessed treatment, in which the balcony fronts lie behind the main face of the building, defined by the broad horizontal bands top and bottom, and the connecting vertical piers. These two contrasting elevations are moulded together in the composition by the soaring stair tower with its curved face of sparkling glass brick. Its articulation from the western block gives emphasis to its verticality and its subtle curve ties it to the south wall.

== Construction ==
The four storey building is constructed of reinforced concrete frame with brick walls, which were plastered smooth and painted white to give a sleek, minimalist appearance. The staircase tower has a distinctive full height glass brick window panel and the building has a flat reinforced concrete roof. The windows are steel framed hung on pivots and with casements.

The design utilizes the sloping topography of the site, gaining useful basement space from the decrease in ground level from the entrance corner. The entrance itself is a covered area acting like an extension of the public street and can be approached from either Yeo Street or Cavendish Road. Slender concrete columns sit on the horizontal ground floor slab and support the overhang to the entrance. In the north-east corner of the site there is a garden court with flower beds and pool, and on the roof a solarium and loggia with planting boxes.

Internally, each dwelling had a customized kitchen, bathroom and built in fittings. Space planning created compact living areas that were also spacious due to the use of built in fittings. High quality materials such as oak floor boards were used for the interiors. Social space was generously proportioned and the shared amenities were planned to maintain privacy whilst also encouraging social interaction between residents.

== International Style ==
Erected prior to the First World War, at the time of its construction Radoma Court was considered the most important block of flats in the International Style of the modern movement. When finished in 1937, it was considered a remarkable building and brought South Africa into the mainstream of modern architecture.

The International Style is characterized by asymmetrical composition, an absence of mouldings, large windows in horizontal bands and a predilection for white rendering. The influence of Le Corbusier, the leading French architect at that time, can be seen all over Radoma Court, from the curved stair-tower with glass-brick end wall to the precision of large square inset windows in blank walls.

It marks the highest point in the flat building work of the architect Harold Le Roith, which had a great influence on that medium in Johannesburg. Strong plastic handling of building masses is evidenced, in which the varying functions of the parts of the building are expressed. Originally, colour contrast enhanced this effect:

Deep blue face brick with white recessed horizontal joints forms the wall of the basement garage, which is entered at the northwest corner of the site. There are pale blue balcony recesses, fawn squaring on the parapets, and the wire mesh parapets are white. The south wall is pale blue with white window frames. The entrance porch is in a deep plum colour on a rough textured plaster on which the name of the building in white lettering is fixed. The squared panel is grey, doors are white and the floor black.

These were bold colour choices, emphasizing the depth of the recesses and entrance overhang. White balcony mesh panels would have stood out against the pale blue recesses and the white lettering in the entrance porch would have had even stronger contrast on the plum walls there. On the roof, the solarium walls were painted a more subtle ‘Eau-de-Nil’ colour which appears as different shades of green in varied sunlight conditions.

The original polychromatic appearance of the building was lost in later maintenance cycles, which made extensive use of white paint.

== Recent history ==
In recent years, most buildings around Radoma Court were hijacked or left in a state of neglect due to white flight.

In 2014, the owner needed to repair the roof and decided to build an additional storey at the same time. But they did not obtain consent from the City of Johannesburg or the Provincial Heritage Resource Agency (PHRAG) in Gauteng. Plans were submitted for the alteration but works commenced whilst waiting for approval. Stop notices were issued but these were ignored and works continued. This action by the owner without the necessary permissions from the City of Johannesburg and the PHRAG caused local outcry.
