= Dicta Boelcke =

List of aerial combat maneuvers

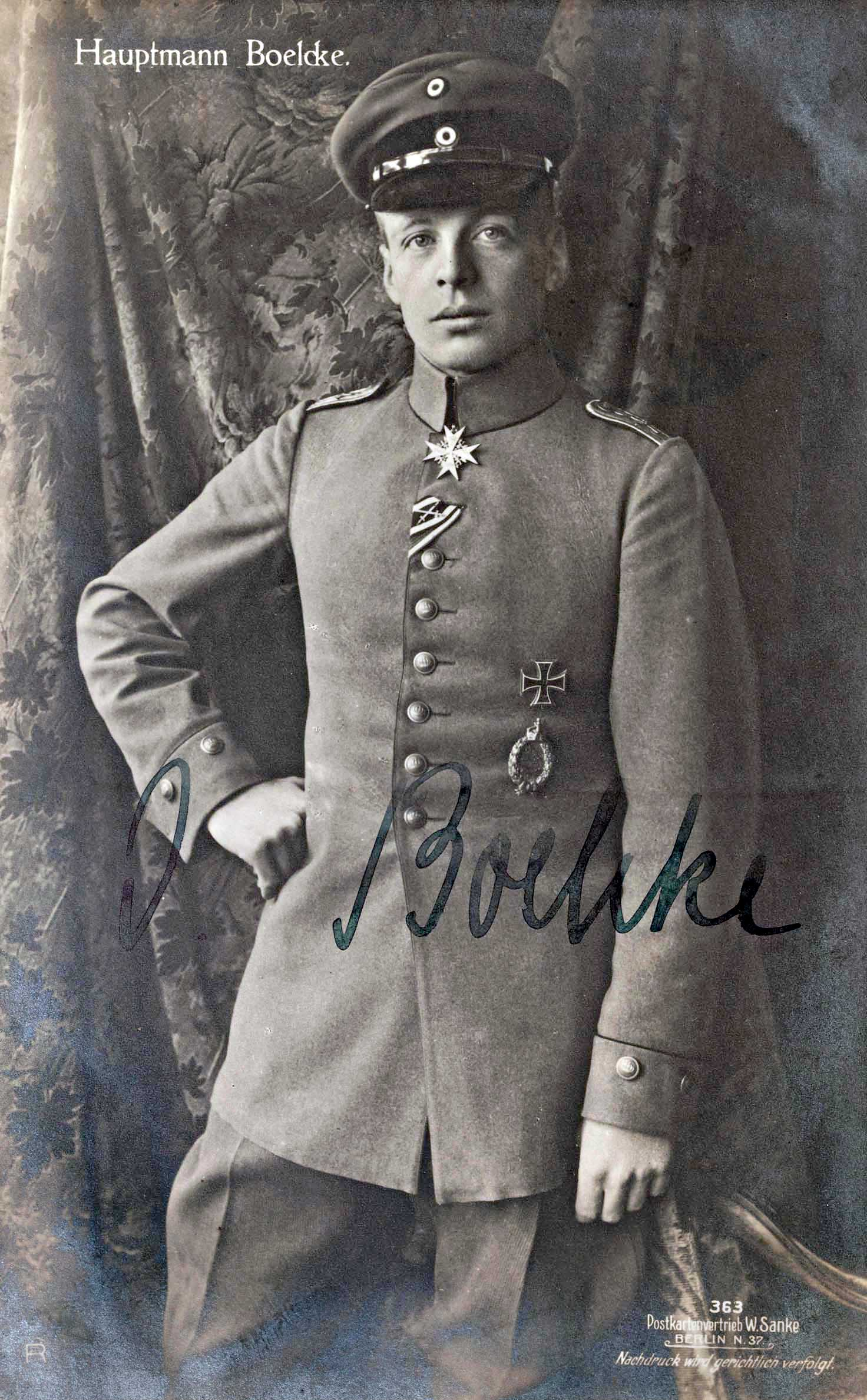
Hauptmann (Captain) Oswald Boelcke, author of the Dicta Boelcke

The Dicta Boelcke is a list of fundamental aerial maneuvers of aerial combat formulated by First World War German flying ace Oswald Boelcke. Equipped with one of the first fighter aircraft, Boelcke became Germany's foremost flying ace during 1915 and 1916. Because of his success in aerial combat and analytic mind, he was tasked by Colonel Hermann von der Lieth-Thomsen with writing a pamphlet on aerial tactics.

Completed in June 1916, it was distributed throughout the German Army's Air Service (Die Fliegertruppen des Deutschen Reiches), some two years before the French and British militaries followed suit with their own tactical guides. Air combat tactical manuals based on the Dicta Boelcke have become more elaborate over time, and have become a mainstay for NATO's air combat training of American, German, Dutch, Norwegian, Turkish, Italian, and Greek fighter pilots.

== The author ==
Oswald Boelcke was one of the first German pilots successful in air-to-air combat. During mid-May 1915, he began to fly one of the original fighter aircraft equipped with a synchronized gun. As he began to shoot down opposing French and British airplanes, he became one of the first German fighter aces. Often flying with Max Immelmann, Boelcke gained experience in the new realm of aerial combat as he discovered the utility of having a wingman, of massing fighter planes for increased fighting power, and of flying loose formations allowing individual pilots tactical independence. Based on his successful combat experiences, he used his training as a professional soldier and his powers as an analytic thinker to design tactics for the use of aircraft in battle.

During this period of pioneering aerial warfare, the British Royal Flying Corps air effort could be summed up by "Attack everything". The French Aeronautique Militaire was concentrating its efforts on building up its bomber force. Boelcke tried to interest Immelmann in devising a tactical doctrine for fighters, to no avail. In mid-1916, Boelcke codified his tactics in the Dicta Boelcke, which was the world's first tactical aerial combat manual for an air force.

During early 1916, Boelcke wrote a brochure entitled "Experiences of Air Fighting", giving tips for attacking any one of three types of opposing aircraft. This was not unique; a few other fliers in the war were sharing such combat tips with one another on a personal level.

After Immelmann's death, Boelcke was withdrawn from combat on 27 June 1916, while he was the war's leading ace, and assigned to Fliegertruppe (Flying Troops) headquarters. His reassignment was in line with the German military doctrine of Auftragstaktik, or order tactics: The belief that the junior officer on the battlefield best knows the tactics needed there. As part of his staff duties revamping the Fliegertruppe into the Luftstreitkräfte (Air Force) in early October 1916, Boelcke wrote the Dicta, which was then distributed throughout the Luftstreitkräfte as the world's first tactical air combat manual. It was two years before the British and French followed suit in 1918. Spurred by the example of the Dicta, many of the world's military air forces eventually developed their own tactical manuals, codified as tactics, techniques, and procedures.

== The Dicta Boelcke ==
According to Boelcke's first biographer, Professor Johannes von Werner, the eight dicta were written for Colonel Hermann von der Lieth-Thomsen.

1. Try to secure advantages before attacking. If possible, keep the sun behind you.
2. Always carry through an attack when you have started it.
3. Fire only at close range, and only when your opponent is properly in your sights.
4. Always keep your eye on your opponent, and never let yourself be deceived by ruses.
5. In any form of attack it is essential to assail your enemy from behind.
6. If your opponent dives on you, do not try to evade his onslaught, but fly to meet it.
7. When over the enemy's lines never forget your own line of retreat.
8. For the Staffel (squadron): Attack on principle in groups of four or six. When the fight breaks up into a series of single combats, take care that several do not go for the same opponent.

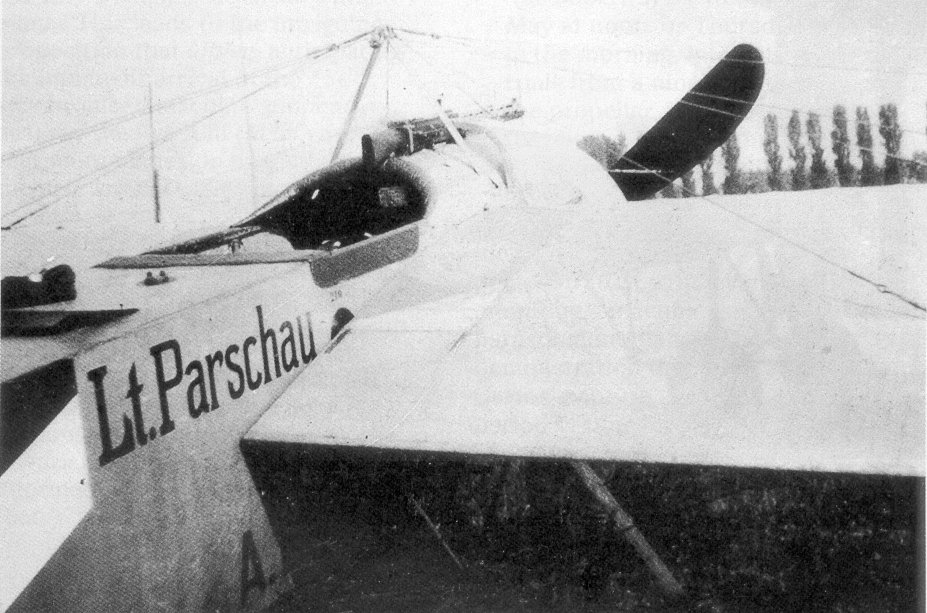
The prototype example of the Fokker Eindecker line of fighters (s/n 216, military s/n A.16/15), the first fighter airplane design with a successfully synchronized machine gun. Boelcke learned his aerial tactics flying one of these aircraft.

There are various versions of the Dicta. (Note: Although the Dicta was originally composed before German fighter squadrons existed, the existing versions of the Dicta refers to squadrons, showing some editing must have occurred.) One version that differs somewhat from the above:

1. Always try to secure an advantageous position before attacking. Climb before and during the approach in order to surprise the enemy from above, and dive on him swiftly from the rear when the moment to attack is at hand.
2. Try to place yourself between the sun and the enemy. This puts the glare of the sun in the enemy's eyes and makes it difficult to see you and impossible for him to shoot with any accuracy.
3. Do not fire the machine guns until the enemy is within range and you have him squarely within your sights.
4. Attack when the enemy least expects it or when he is preoccupied with other duties such as observation, photography, or bombing.
5. Never turn your back and try to run away from an enemy fighter. If you are surprised by an attack on your tail, turn and face the enemy with your guns.
6. Keep your eye on the enemy and do not allow him to deceive you with tricks. If your opponent seems damaged, follow him down until he crashes to be sure he is not faking.
7. Foolish acts of bravery only bring death. The Jasta (squadron) must fight as a unit with close teamwork between all pilots. The signals of its leaders must be obeyed.
8. For the Staffel (squadron): Attack in principle in groups of four or six. When the fight breaks up into a series of single combats, take care that several do not go for one opponent.

Still another version can be found online.

If followed assiduously, the Dicta tactics often led to an unseen approach for a surprise attack. As historical study has shown, thus getting in the first shot in an engagement guarantees a successful attack over 80% of the time.

== Legacy ==
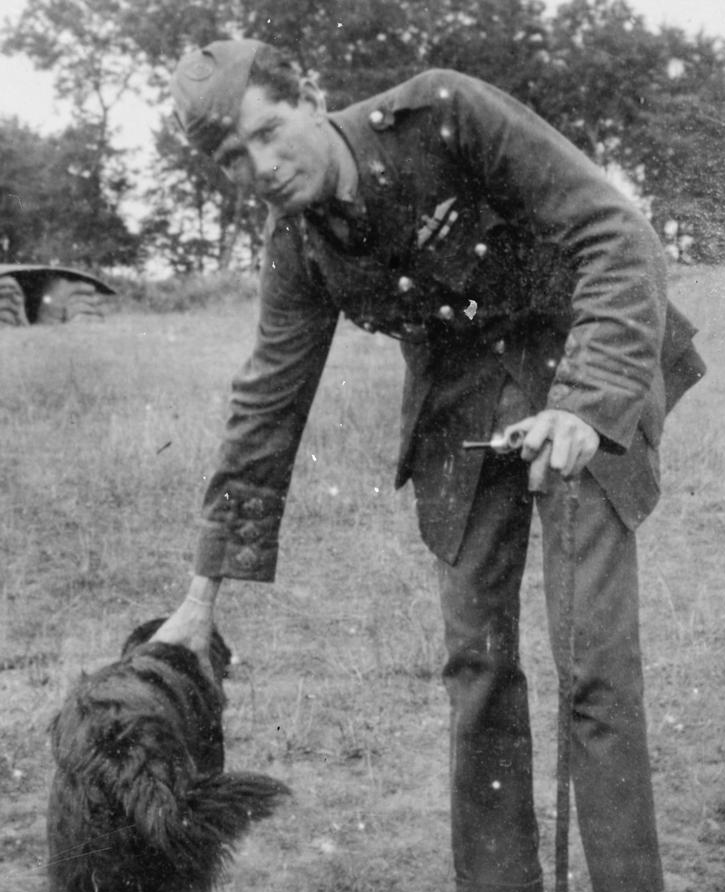
Mick Mannock

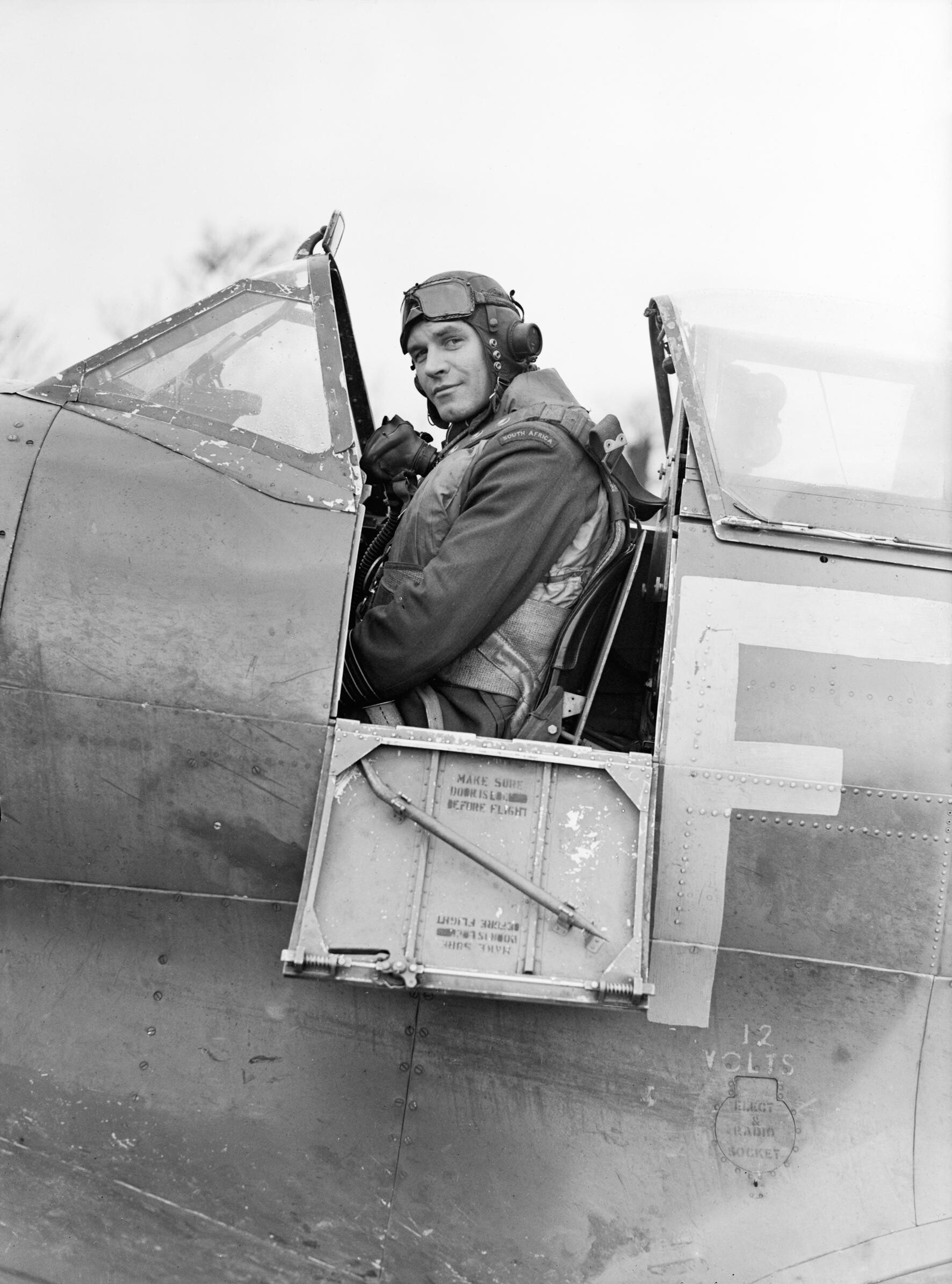
Malan in the cockpit of his Supermarine Spitfire at Biggin Hill, Kent.

After writing the Dicta, Boelcke's tactics were taught in the fighter school he had suggested founding. He suggested that fighter planes be organized into squadrons. He also organized and led one of these original German fighter squadrons, Jagdstaffel 2. By the time he died in action after his 40th victory, he had thoroughly schooled his squadron in his tactics. Jasta 2 went on to be one of the two most successful German fighter squadrons during the remainder of the war, scoring 336 victories, and achieving a victory ratio that ran as high as 12 to one.

Eight of Jasta 2 original members became aces. 25 aces served in Jasta 2, scoring 90% of its victories. Four of its members served as generals during World War II. There was a steady rotation of Jasta 2's aces into commands of other squadrons. The most prominent example of this was Manfred von Richthofen, leading ace of the war and assigned to command the most successful German squadron, Jasta 11. As a result of Boelcke's tactical concepts, the Imperial German Air Service exacted an ever greater toll on Allied aircraft right up until war's end. For instance, Jasta 2 was credited with 46 victories for September 1918.

When the next logical step was taken by the Germans in organizing fighter squadrons into a wing in June 1917, Richthofen was picked to lead it. Before his death on 21 April 1918, he wrote his own Dicta for wing tactics. It referred extensively to Boelcke's Dicta.

Similar to the Dicta Boelcke was Mick Mannock's Rules of Combat:

Mannock's fifteen rules on air combat

1. Pilots must dive to attack with zest, and must hold their fire until they get within one hundred yards of the target
2. Achieve surprise by approaching from the east (German side of the front)
3. Utilize the sun's glare and clouds to achieve surprise
4. Pilots must keep physically fit by exercise and the moderate use of stimulants
5. Pilots must sight their guns and practice as much as possible. Targets are fleeting.
6. Pilots must practice spotting machines in the air and recognizing them at long range, and every aeroplane is to be treated as an enemy until it is certain it is not
7. Pilots must learn where the enemy's blind spots are
8. Scouts must be attacked from above and two-seaters from beneath their tails
9. Pilots must practice quick turns, as this manoeuvre is used more than another in a fight
10. Pilots must practice judging distances in flight as these are very deceptive
11. Decoys must be guarded against—a single enemy is often a decoy—therefore the air above must be searched before attacking
12. If the day is sunny, machines should be turned with as little bank as possible; otherwise the sun glistening on their wings will give away their positions at long range
13. Pilots must keep turning in a dogfight and never fly straight unless firing
14. Pilots must never dive away from an enemy, as he gives an opponent a non-deflection shot—bullets are faster than aeroplanes
15. Pilots must keep an eye on their watches during patrols, on the direction and strength of the wind

During the early days of World War II, South African ace Sailor Malan espoused his Ten Rules for Air Fighting. These rules closely followed the Dicta Boelcke. For instance, Rule 5's "Always turn and face the attack" could have been borrowed from the Dicta. Malan's Rules were distributed throughout the Royal Air Force.

The simple Dicta Boelcke manual has, over time, evolved into widespread use of tactics, techniques, and procedures manuals for air forces worldwide. The United States Joint Chiefs of Staff (JCS), the United States Navy (USN), and the United States Air Force (USAF) each have their own air tactics manuals. Under the auspices of the North Atlantic Treaty Organization (NATO), the USAF trains German, Dutch, Norwegian, Turkish, Italian, and Greek fighter pilots at Sheppard Air Force Base, using air tactics manuals descended from the Dicta Boelcke.

== Bibliography ==
- Franks, Norman; Bailey, Frank W.; Guest, Russell (1993). Above the Lines: The Aces and Fighter Units of the German Air Service, Naval Air Service and Flanders Marine Corps, 1914–1918. London: Grub Street. ISBN 0-948817-73-9.
- Franks, Norman (2001). Sharks Among Minnows. London: Grub Street. ISBN 978-1-902304-92-2.
- Head, R. G. (2016). Oswald Boelcke: Germany's First Fighter Ace and Father of Air Combat. London: Grub Street. ISBN 978-1-910690-23-9.
- Van Wyngarden, Greg (2006). Early German Aces of World War I. Aircraft of the Aces No. 73. Oxford, UK: Osprey. ISBN 978-1-84176-997-4.
- Werner, Johannes (1932). Boelcke der Mensch, der Flieger, der Führer der deutschen Jagdfliegerei [Knight of Germany: Oswald Boelcke, German Ace]. Leipzig, Germany: K.F. Koehler Verlag. Havertown, PA: Casemate (2009), first edition (1985). ISBN 978-1-935149-11-8.
