= Wanderers Stadium =

Sports venue in Johannesburg, South Africa

- The Bullring
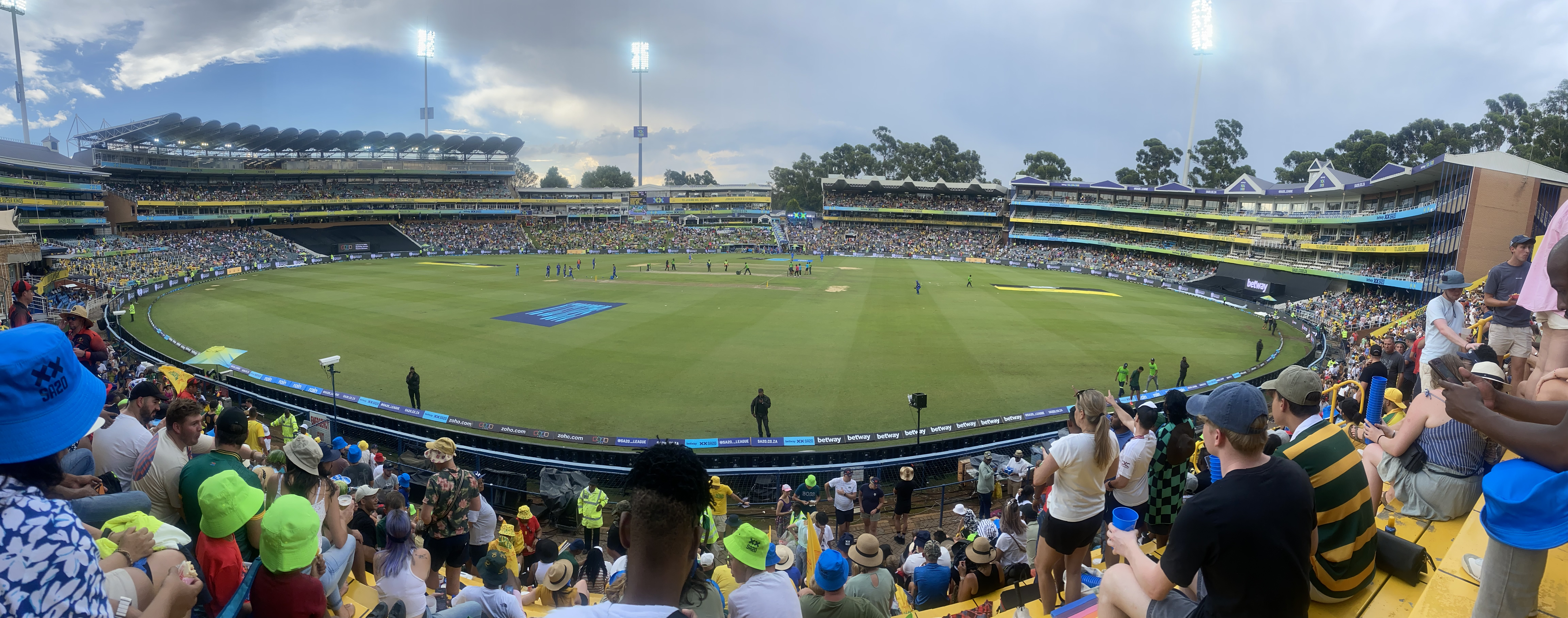
- Wanderers Stadium in 2024
- Interactive map of Wanderers Stadium

Ground information
- Location: Illovo, Sandton, Johannesburg
- Country: South Africa
- Coordinates: 26°7′52″S 28°3′27″E
- Capacity: 34,000
- End names
- Corlett Drive End; Golf Course End

International information
- First men's Test: 24–29 December 1956: South Africa v England
- Last men's Test: 8–11 March 2023: South Africa v West Indies
- First men's ODI: 13 December 1992: South Africa v India
- Last men's ODI: 27 September 2026: South Africa v Australia
- First men's T20I: 21 October 2005: South Africa v New Zealand
- Last men's T20I: 31 January 2026: South Africa v West Indies
- First women's Test: 17–21 December 1960: South Africa v England
- Last women's Test: 24–27 March 1972: South Africa v New Zealand
- First women's ODI: 22 September 2013: South Africa v Bangladesh
- Last women's ODI: 19 December 2025: South Africa v Ireland
- First women's T20I: 21 February 2016: South Africa v England
- Last women's T20I: 25 April 2026: South Africa v India

Team information
Transvaal now known as Highveld Lions	(1956–present)
Jozi Stars	(2018–2019)
Joburg Super Kings	(2023–present)
- As of 11 October 2026; Source: Cricinfo

The Wanderers Stadium, also known as the Bullring, is a cricket stadium situated just south of Sandton in Illovo, Johannesburg in Gauteng, South Africa. Test, One Day and First class cricket matches are played here. It is the home ground for the Imperial Lions and the Joburg Super Kings.

== History ==
The stadium has a seating capacity of 34,000, and was built in 1956 to replace the Old Wanderers Stadium. It was completely overhauled following South Africa's readmission to international cricket in 1991. In 1996, five new 65-metre-high (213 ft) floodlight masts replaced the existing four 30-metre-high (98 ft) masts, enabling day-night limited-overs cricket. It is nicknamed 'The Bullring' due to its design and intimidating atmosphere.

On 1 October 2004, the Wanderers Clubhouse was virtually destroyed by fire.

== Events ==
Wanderers Stadium hosted a rugby union test match in April 1980 between South Africa and the South American Jaguars while Johannesburg's regular venue, Ellis Park Stadium, was being redeveloped.

On 12 March 2006, this stadium hosted the greatest One-day International match ever played between South Africa and Australia, in which a world record score of 434 was chased down by South Africa.

The stadium hosted the 2009 Indian Premier League's second semi-final and the final in which the Deccan Chargers beat the Royal Challengers Bangalore to grab the championship title. It also hosted the final of Champion League Twenty20 in the 2010 and 2012 edition.

The 2003 Cricket World Cup and 2007 T20 World Cup finals were held at the Wanderers Stadium.

On 18 January 2015, the Wanderers stadium saw South Africa's AB de Villiers break the 19-year-old record for the fastest ODI half-century, previously held by Sri Lankan maestro Sanath Jayasuriya, by making 50 off 16 balls against the West Indies. In the same match, he also broke Corey Anderson's fastest ODI century record (held for one year and seven days) by making 100 off 31 deliveries. He finished on 149, caught on the boundary in the final over, scored off 44 balls with a strike rate of 338.63. On 21 February 2016, AB de Villiers scored the fastest 50 (21 balls) for South Africa in a T20I against England.

The 2027 Cricket World Cup final would also be held in this stadium.

== Trivia ==
In July 2018, the stadium hosted former US president, Barack Obama at the Nelson Mandela Lecture.

== See also ==
- List of Test cricket grounds

Events and tenants
Preceded by Lord's	Cricket World Cup; Final Venue; 2003	Succeeded by Kensington Oval
