= Ten Rules for Air Fighting =

Aerial combat rules

Adolph Gysbert Malan DSO & Bar DFC (24 March 1910 – 17 September 1963), better known as Sailor Malan, was a South African World War II fighter pilot, who led No. 74 Squadron RAF during the height of the Battle of Britain. Malan developed a set of simple rules for fighter pilots, which were eventually found throughout RAF Fighter Command:

== Rules ==
"TEN OF MY RULES FOR AIR FIGHTING"

1. Wait until you see the whites of his eyes. Fire short bursts of 1 to 2 seconds and only when your sights are definitely 'ON'.
2. Whilst shooting think of nothing else, brace the whole of the body, have both hands on the stick, concentrate on your ring sight.
3. Always keep a sharp lookout. "Keep your finger out!"
4. Height gives You the initiative.
5. Always turn and face the attack.
6. Make your decisions promptly. It is better to act quickly even though your tactics are not the best.
7. Never fly straight and level for more than 30 seconds in the combat area.
8. When diving to attack always leave a proportion of your formation above to act as top guard.
9. INITIATIVE, AGGRESSION, AIR DISCIPLINE, and TEAM WORK are the words that MEAN something in Air Fighting.
10. Go in quickly – Punch hard – Get out!

== See also ==
- Dicta Boelcke, a First World War dictum on air combat, by German ace Oswald Boelcke
- Mannock's fifteen rules on air combat, World War One
