= Illovo, Gauteng =

Illovo
- Location within Gauteng Location within South Africa
- Coordinates: 26.126°S 28.053°E
- Country: South Africa
- Province: Gauteng
- Municipality: City of Johannesburg
- Main Place: Sandton

Area
  - Total: 2.27 km^{2} (0.88 sq mi)

Population (2011)
  - Total: 4,533
  - Density: 2,000/km^{2} (5,170/sq mi)

Racial makeup (2023)
  - Black African: 30%
  - Coloured: 3%
  - Indian/Asian: 9%
  - White: 56%
  - Other: 2%

First languages (2023)
  - English: 69%
  - Zulu: 7%
  - Afrikaans: 6%
  - Tswana: 2%
  - Other: 8%
- Time zone: UTC+2 (SAST)
- Postal code (street): 2196
- PO box: 4150

Illovo is a suburb of Sandton, South Africa. It borders Hyde Park, Sandhurst, Inanda and Melrose. Illovo is sought after and home to many young professionals and creatives because of its close proximity to Sandton and Johannesburg business centres and apartment blocks. It is located in Region E of the City of Johannesburg Metropolitan Municipality.

The suburb has historically been home to a significant Jewish minority, making up 33.7% of the population in 1971. It remains home to a Chabad congregation.

During the apartheid era, it was classed as a "whites only" area under the terms of the Group Areas Act. Since the repeal of the Act in 1991, the resident-mix has become more cosmopolitan, albeit with white residents remaining the largest population group.

== History ==
Illovo's name is derived from the Illovo River in KwaZulu-Natal, which in turn takes its name from the Mlovo (or Mlovu) trees growing on its banks. In 1939, the notable architect Harold Le Roith built Dunkeld Mansions, a luxury apartment building on Hurlingham Rd.

== Sports ==
Wanderers Stadium is located in Illovo, which is home to the Highveld Lions, Johannesburg's cricket team. Capacity at the Imperial Wanderers Stadium is around 34 000. Construction on the current stadium commenced in 1955 with the first 1st-class match played between Transvaal and Natal on 16, 17 and 19 November 1956.

== Education ==
The University of Pretoria's business school, the Gordon Institute of Business Science (GIBS), is located in Illovo. It has previously been ranked as the best business school in Africa.
