= Springbok Legion =

South African anti-apartheid military veterans' association

The Springbok Legion was a veterans' organisation and anti-apartheid organisation in South Africa.

== History ==
The Springbok Legion was founded in 1941. In 1944, the legion came under the leadership of Jack Hodgson and Jock Isacowitz.

For the 1948 South African general election, the Springbok Legion encouraged coloured South Africans to vote for the United Party and the Labour Party. Springbok Legion considered the National Party's efforts to further disenfranchise coloured South Africans and to rollback South African democracy as being akin to fascism or dictatorship. Additionally, the legion was one of many groups which opposed and resisted the Suppression of Communism Act.

By 1952, the Springbok Legion had 125,000 members. At that years Springbok Legion conference, Cecil Williams was elected as chairman. Williams worked with Bram Fischer to bring together the legion with the Congress of Democrats, but before the organisations could unite, the Springbok Legion's offices were raided by police and Williams was ordered by the Minister of Police to resign from any group of which he was a member.

=== Fighting Talk ===
In January 1942, the Homefront League of the Springbok Legion launched its newspaper Fighting Talk, which was launched in Johannesburg. Fighting Talk was published monthly in both English and Afrikaans.

Fighting Talk was forcibly disbanded by the Apartheid regime in February 1963.

== See also ==
- Apartheid
- Torch Commando
