= Jock Isacowitz =

South African journalist and anti-apartheid activist (1915–1962)

- Born: Joseph Louis Isacowitz; 7 February 1915; Benoni, Transvaal, Union of South Africa
- Died: 30 January 1962 (aged 46); Johannesburg
- Resting place: Westpark Cemetery
- Citizenship: South Africa
- Education: University of the Witwatersrand
- Occupations: Pharmacist, politician
- Spouse: Eileen Lurie
- Children: 3

Joseph "Jock" Louis Isacowitz (7 February 1915 – 18 June 1974) was a South African Liberal Party politician, anti-apartheid activist and co-founder of the Springbok Legion.

== Early life ==
Isacowitz was born in Benoni in the province of Transvaal in 1915 to Jewish parents, Sarah Leah Bear and Israel Isacowitz. His father, Israel died at the age of 34–35 in 1921 when Jock was six-years-old. He attended Benoni High School and later the University of the Witwatersrand, where he graduated with a Bachelor of Pharmacy (Hons). He was of Lithuanian Jewish descent.

At university he befriended Jewish students Rusty Bernstein and Kurt Jonas. He was influenced by Jonas, who introduced him to Marxism. For a time he was a member of the South African Communist Party and identified as an atheist. He resigned from the party in February 1946, writing that its totalitarian character "offended my conscience."

He fought in the Second World War with South African forces in East and North Africa, where he was a sergeant-major and was wounded in action. The horrors of the Holocaust led to his rejection of anti-Zionism and joined a socialist Zionist organisation. He joined the South African Jewish Board of Deputies, serving as a delegate on the national executive and went on missions to visit Holocaust survivors in Displaced persons camps in post–World War II Europe and absorption centres in Israel.

== Political career ==
Prior to the formation of the Liberal Party, he co-led with advocate Jack Unterhalter, one of three separate liberal groups in Johannesburg. Their formation sought to establish relations with the African National Congress and the South African Indian Congress.

He was a founding member of the Liberal Party, attending their inaugural meeting in Cape Town in 1953. He achieved his earlier aim by setting up meetings between the party and the ANC. However, he expressed his frustration: "I was not happy with the attitude of many members of the National Committee towards the ANC... I recognise the difficulties arising from difficult personality differences with the ANC but I am afraid that some of our members can't divide this from a proper appreciation of the historic role of the ANC. I do not feel justified in opening discussions again and carrying them on further, until we have clarified our own basic attitude towards the ANC."

He built up the party's support base in the Transvaal and served in several positions as Transvaal Chairman and National Vice-chairman. He was also a key organised for the party and chaired its conferences.

He was regarded as a threat by the apartheid government and banned from attending all meetings for two years. In the wake of the Sharpeville massacre in 1960, a State of Emergency was declared and he was jailed for 3 months.

== Personal life ==
He married Eileen Lurie and they had three children together. His son, Roy, later made aliyah to Israel, where he became a newspaper journalist.

=== Death ===
He died of Leukemia on 30 January 1962, 18 months after his prison release. He was survived by his wife and children, as well as his mother, Sarah. Sarah died in Netanya in Israel in 1982 and Eileen died in 2010 in Johannesburg.
