= Benmore Gardens =

- Location within Gauteng Location within South Africa
- Coordinates: 26°05′27″S 28°02′47″E
- Country: South Africa
- Province: Gauteng
- Municipality: City of Johannesburg

Area
  - Total: 0.74 km^{2} (0.29 sq mi)

Population (2001)
  - Total: 418
  - Density: 560/km^{2} (1,500/sq mi)
- Time zone: UTC+2 (SAST)
- Postal code (street): 2196
- PO box: 2010

Benmore Gardens is a suburb of Johannesburg in the Sandton area. It is located in Region E of the City of Johannesburg Metropolitan Municipality.

== History ==
In 1964, architect Harold Le Roith purchased one hundred acres in what became Benmore Gardens. He was to work with the architect Richard Neutra on realising a project to build a self-contained village centre with apartments, shops and offices. The project was inspired by Le Roith's visit to Tapiola, a newly constructed town in Finland. Le Roith pulled out of the project after the completion of two apartment blocks.
