= Sailor Malan =

South African WWII flying ace and anti-apartheid activist (1910–1963)

Group Captain Sailor Malan DSO* DFC*
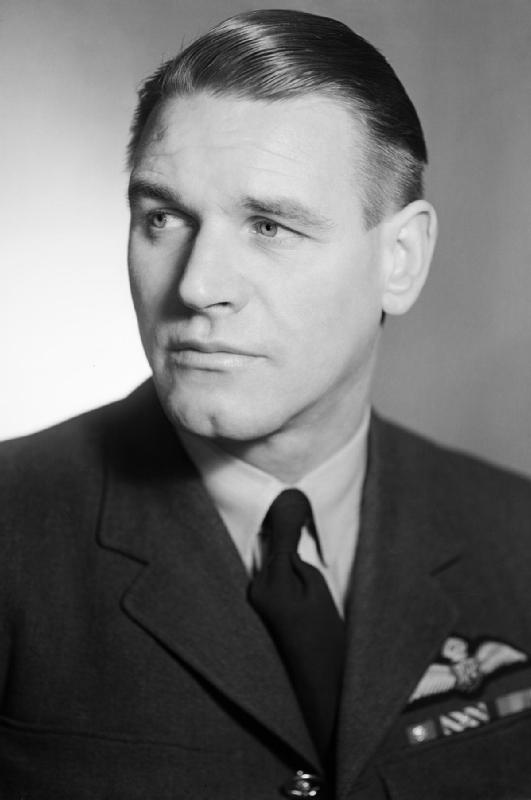
- Group Captain Sailor Malan c. 1945
- Born: 3 October 1910; Wellington, Cape Province, Union of South Africa
- Died: 17 September 1963 (aged 52); Kimberley, Cape Province, South Africa
- Burial place: West End Cemetery, Kimberley
- Military career
- Allegiance: United Kingdom
- Branch: Royal Navy; Royal Air Force
- Service years: 1932–1946
- Rank: Group Captain
- Nickname: Sailor
- Commands: No. 145 (Free French) Fighter Wing; No. 19 Wing RAF; No. 74 Squadron RAF
- Conflicts: Second World War: Battle of Barking Creek; Battle of Dunkirk; Battle of Britain; Operation Overlord
- Awards: Distinguished Service Order & Bar; Distinguished Flying Cross & Bar; Croix de guerre (Belgium); War Cross (Czechoslovakia); Legion of Honour (France); Croix de guerre (France)
- Other work: Farmer and leader of the Torch Commando

Adolph Gysbert Malan, DSO & Bar, DFC & Bar (3 October 1910 – 17 September 1963), better known as Sailor Malan, was a South African fighter pilot and flying ace in the Royal Air Force (RAF) who led No. 74 Squadron RAF during the Battle of Britain. He finished his fighter career in 1941 with twenty-seven destroyed, seven shared destroyed and two unconfirmed, three probables and sixteen damaged. At the time he was the RAF's leading ace, and one of the highest-scoring pilots to have served wholly with RAF Fighter Command during the Second World War.

After the war, Malan returned to South Africa. In the 1950s Malan became leader of the Torch Commando, a liberal anti-authoritarian organisation that opposed the introduction of the apartheid system.

== Early life ==
Malan was born on 3 October 1910 to an Afrikaner family of Huguenot descent in Wellington, Western Cape. He joined the South African Training Ship General Botha in 1924 or 1925 as a naval cadet (Note: cadet number 168) at the age of 14, and on 5 January 1928 engaged as an officer cadet (Note: seaman's discharge number R42512) aboard the Landsdown Castle of the Union-Castle Line which later earned him the nickname of "Sailor" amongst his pilot colleagues. On 19 February 1932, he joined the Royal Naval Reserve as an acting sub-lieutenant, and was commissioned a sub-lieutenant on 18 June 1935.

== Royal Air Force ==
In 1935 the Royal Air Force (RAF) started the rapid expansion of its pilot corps, for which Malan volunteered. He learned to fly in the de Havilland Tiger Moth at an elementary flying school near Bristol, flying for the first time on 6 January 1936. He was commissioned as an acting pilot officer on 2 March, completed training by the end of the year, and was sent to join 74 Squadron on 20 December 1936. He was confirmed as a pilot officer on 6 January 1937. He was promoted to acting flying officer on 20 May 1938 and promoted to substantive flying officer on 6 July. He received another promotion to acting flight lieutenant on 2 March 1939, six months before the outbreak of war.

Malan developed the Ten Rules for Air Fighting for fighter pilots.

== Second World War ==
=== Battle of Barking Creek ===
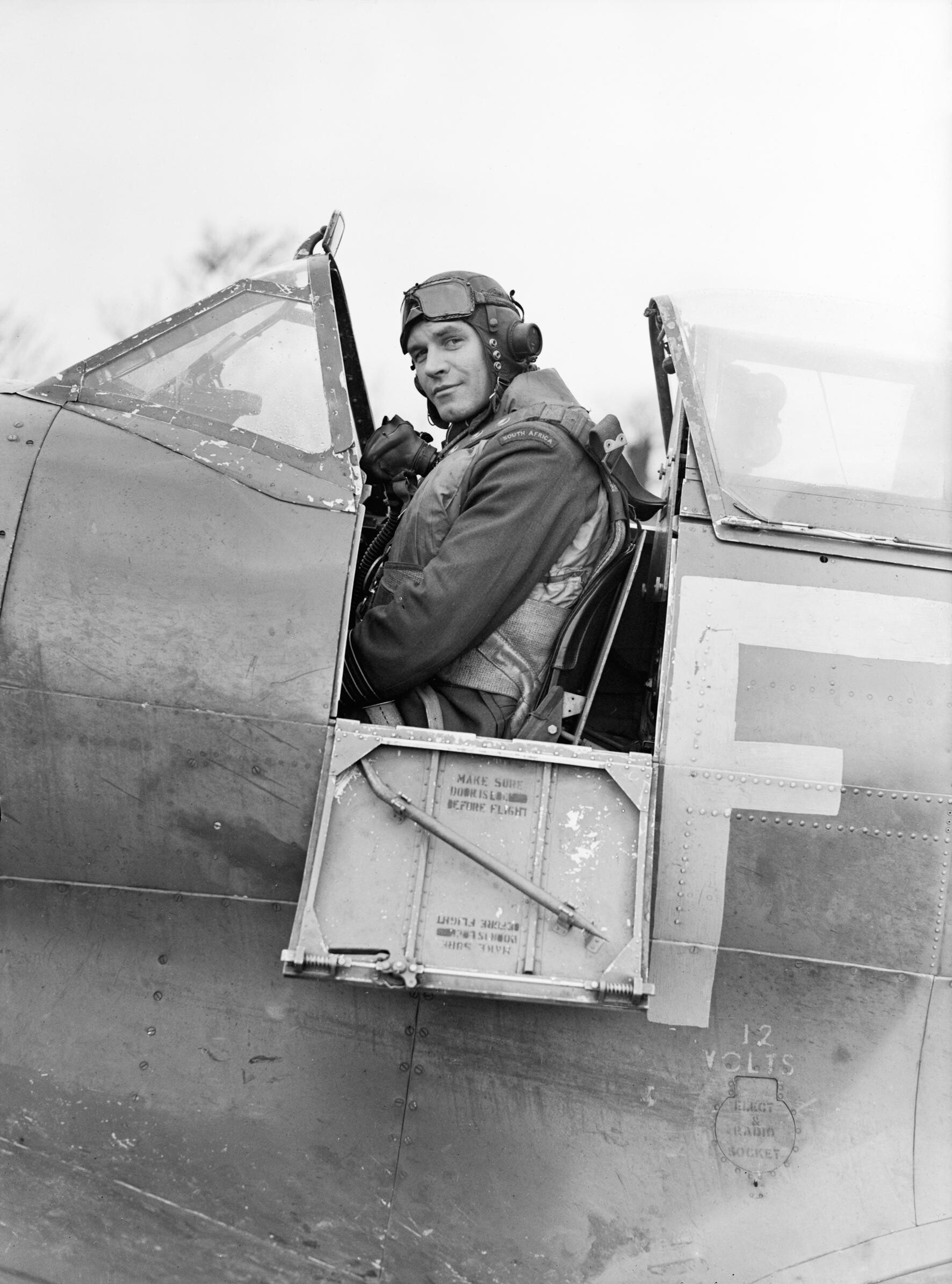
Malan in the cockpit of his Supermarine Spitfire at Biggin Hill, Kent.

No. 74 Squadron was dispatched 15 hours after war was declared to intercept a bomber raid that turned out to be returning RAF planes. On 6 September 1939, "A" Flight was scrambled to intercept a suspected enemy radar track and ran into the Hurricanes of No. 56 Squadron RAF. Believing 56 to be the enemy, Malan ordered an attack. Paddy Byrne and John Freeborn downed two RAF aircraft, killing one officer – Montague Hulton-Harrop – in friendly fire, which became known as the Battle of Barking Creek. At the subsequent court-martial, Malan denied responsibility for the attack. He testified for the prosecution against his own pilots stating that Freeborn had been "irresponsible, impetuous, and had not taken proper heed of vital communications". This prompted Freeborn's counsel, Patrick Hastings, to call Malan a bare-faced liar. Hastings was assisted in defending the pilots by Roger Bushell, who, like Malan, had been born in South Africa. The court ruled the entire incident as an unfortunate error and acquitted both pilots.

=== Dunkirk ===
After fierce fighting over Dunkirk during the evacuation of the British Army from Dunkirk on 28 May 1940, Malan was awarded the Distinguished Flying Cross (DFC) having achieved five "kills". During the night of 19/20 June Malan flew a night sortie in bright moonlight and shot down two Heinkel He 111 bombers, a then-unique feat for which a bar was awarded to his DFC. On 6 July, he was promoted to flight lieutenant.

Malan and his senior pilots abandoned the Vic formation used by the RAF and turned to a looser formation (the finger-four) similar to the four aircraft Schwarm the Luftwaffe had developed during the Spanish Civil War. It is believed that on 28 July he met Werner Mölders in combat, damaged his plane and wounded him, but failed to bring him down, though recent research has suggested that Mölders was wounded in a fight with No. 41 Squadron RAF.

=== Squadron leader of No. 74 Squadron ===
On 8 August, Malan was given command of 74 Squadron and promoted to acting squadron leader at the height of the Battle of Britain. On 11 August, action started at 7 am when the squadron was sent to intercept a raid near Dover, which was followed by three more raids, lasting all day. At the end of the day, 74 Squadron had claimed to have shot down 38 aircraft, and was known from then on as "Sailor's August the Eleventh". Malan himself commented, "thus ended a very successful morning of combat". He received a bar to his DFC on 13 August.

Sailor Malan, colour oil painting by Cuthbert Orde

On 29 December 1941 Malan was added to the select list of airmen who had sat for one of Cuthbert Orde's iconic RAF charcoal portraits. He had the rarer honour of also being the subject of a full colour painting by Orde.

=== Wing commander – Biggin Hill ===
On 24 December, Malan received the Distinguished Service Order, and on 22 July 1941, a bar to the DSO. On 10 March 1941 he was appointed as one of the first wing leaders for the offensive operations that spring and summer, leading the Biggin Hill Wing until mid-August, when he was rested from operations. He finished his active fighter career in 1941 with 27 kills destroyed, 7 shared destroyed and 2 unconfirmed, 3 probables and 16 damaged, as one of the highest scoring pilots to have served wholly with Fighter Command during World War II. He was transferred to the reserve as a squadron leader on 6 January 1942.

After a lecture tour to the USA, he commanded the Central Gunnery School for more than a year. Malan was promoted to temporary wing commander on 1 September 1942 and became station commander at RAF Biggin Hill, receiving a promotion to war substantive wing commander on 1 July 1943.

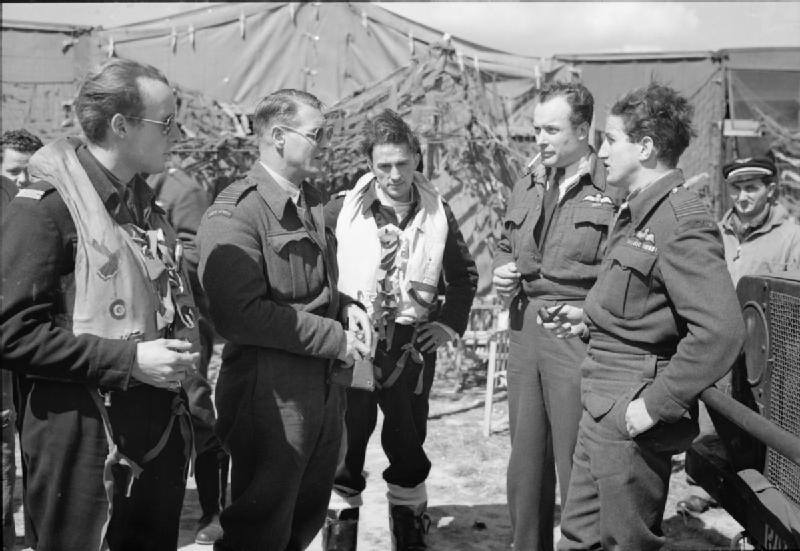
Malan (second from left), RAF and Free French officers on D-Day

== Post-war opposition to apartheid ==
After the conclusion of the war, Malan resigned his commission with the Royal Air Force in April 1946, retaining the rank of group captain, and returned home to South Africa, where he commenced a career in sheep farming.

Malan maintained his ties to the RAF community however, acting as president of the Royal Air Forces Association’s South African Area and becoming a life-member of its Johannesburg Branch.

In the early 1950s, he became involved in increasingly volatile South African domestic politics with its radical polarising atmosphere and racially and culturally divided societal tensions. After the National Party was voted into government in the late 1940s South Africa's domestic governance moved to a position of national conservatism and introduced apartheid, which Malan objected to. In the early 1950s in response Malan joined a liberal politically organised protest movement opposed to the introduction of the apartheid system styling itself as the Torch Commando, of which – with his public recognition acquired from his war career – he was elected president. Through the early 1950s he involved himself in political opposition to what he perceived was increasing authoritarianism of the National Party in government, which he felt threatened to become fascist in nature. At one point the Torch Commando (called for its predilection for staging night-time rallies outside government buildings with the protestors bearing flaming torches for dramatic illumination) movement had 250,000 members, and staged well-attended rallies across South Africa, which Malan often publicly addressed.

By the late 1950s, the movement had lost momentum as some of the factions that constituted it increasingly moved from a hitherto public liberal position to one of world communism, and splintered away to join the African National Congress (ANC), with which Malan was not sympathetic. The rise of the ANC and its perceived radical agenda discouraged the majority of the Torch Commando's membership from continuing with their campaign against the apartheid state laws, leaving Malan with the disintegrating organisation and him retiring from politics and public life, leaving the National Party to rule South Africa for the next four decades.

== Death ==
Malan died at the age of 52 on 17 September 1963 from Parkinson's disease, at the time a rare and little understood medical condition. A considerable sum of money was raised in his name to further study the disease. His funeral service was at St Cyprian's Cathedral, Kimberley, and his body was buried at West End Cemetery in Kimberley, Cape Province. Due to his prominent role in opposition to apartheid, the South African government sought to marginalise his death in order to erase any legacy of the Torch Commando. Malan was not permitted a military funeral and all South African military personnel who attended his funeral were instructed not to wear their uniforms. The South African Air Force was instructed not to give any tribute to his death.

== Awards and decorations ==
- Distinguished Service Order and Bar (DSO & Bar)
- Distinguished Flying Cross and Bar (United Kingdom) (DFC & Bar)
- 1939-45 Star with Battle of Britain Clasp
- Air Crew Europe Star with France & Germany Clasp
- Defence Medal (United Kingdom)
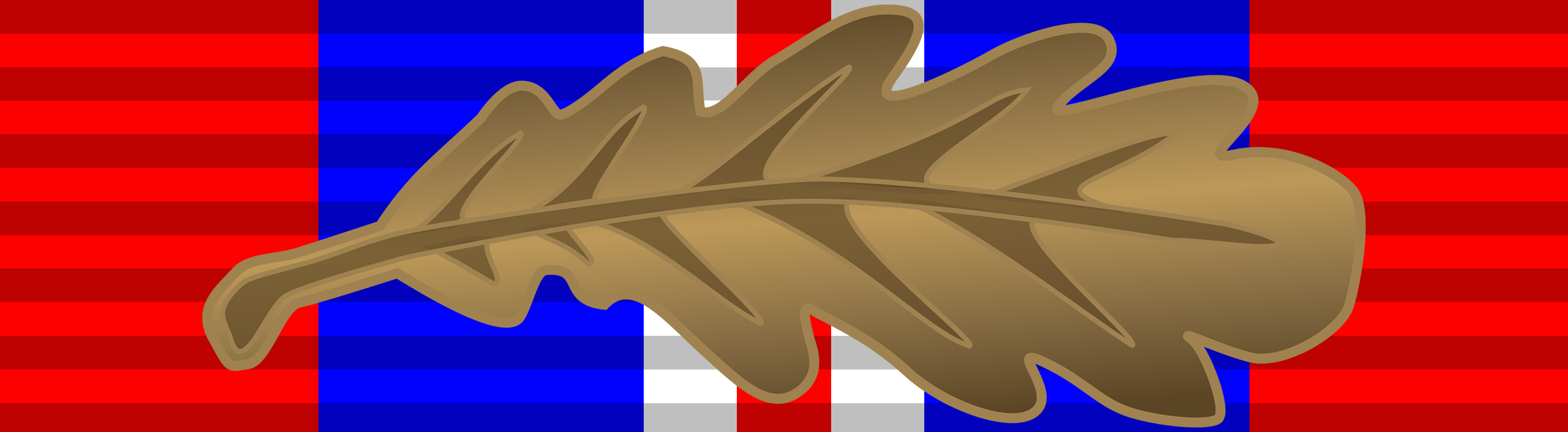
- War Medal 1939 – 1945 (Mentioned in Dispatches) (MID)
- Legion of Honour (Officer) (Note: French: Légion d'honneur - Officier) (France) (Ordre national de la Légion d'honneur)
- Croix de Guerre 1939–1945 (France)
- Croix de Guerre (Belgium)
- Czechoslovak War Cross 1939 Ribbon

== Cinematic portrayals ==
In the 1969 film Battle of Britain, the character of the Squadron Leader nicknamed “Skipper” played by Robert Shaw was based on Malan.

== See also ==
- List of top World War II aces
- List of World War II aces from South Africa
- Huguenots in South Africa, for the history of French surnames (like Malan) in South Africa.
