= Temple Shalom (Johannesburg) =

Reform Jewish synagogue in South Africa

Religion
- Affiliation: Reform Judaism
- Ecclesiastical or organizational status: Synagogue
- Year consecrated: 1950
- Status: Defunct

Location
- Location: Louis Botha Avenue, Highlands North, Johannesburg
- Country: South Africa

Architecture
- Architect: Harold Le Roith
- Type: Synagogue architecture
- Style: Modernist

Temple Shalom (formally North Eastern District Jewish Reform Synagogue) was a Progressive Jewish congregation and synagogue situated on Louis Botha Avenue in Highlands North, a suburb of Johannesburg. The congregation was established in 1945 and the synagogue was consecrated in 1950. It served the community for over 65 years before its closure.

== History ==
The congregation was established in 1945. A synagogue was designed in the Modernist style by architect Harold Le Roith and consecrated in August 1950. The opening of the synagogue was attended by Rabbi Moses Cyrus Weiler and William Nicol, Administrator of the Transvaal province. During the Rosh Hashanah service of the same year, Rabbi Weiler led a memorial service for the former Prime Minister, Jan Smuts. In February 1951, Rabbi David Henry Arrow from the United States was inducted by Rabbi Weiler as the leader of the congregation. In 1965 it had a membership of 2, 500 congregants.

In August 1966, two Orthodox rabbis in Johannesburg, Rabbi Prof. J. Newman and Rabbi S. Poupko sent a congratulatory letter to the congregation as it celebrated its 21st birthday. The Johannesburg Beit Din intervened, warning Orthodox clergy against “fraternization with Reform.”

== See also ==
- History of the Jews in South Africa
- List of synagogues in South Africa
