= Kenneth van der Spuy =

Kenneth Reid van der Spuy CBE, MC
- Born: 18 March 1892
- Died: 26 May 1991 (aged 99)
- Military career
- Branch: South African Air Force
- Rank: Major General
- Conflicts: World War I Russian Civil War; World War II

Major-General Kenneth Reid van der Spuy CBE MC (18 March 1892 – 26 May 1991) was a South African Air Force officer. He saw service with the Royal Flying Corps in World War I.

In 1913, the South African government started a flying school and advertised for prospective pilots in the Government Gazette. Van der Spuy was one of only 10 selected.

Six of the original group of pilots were chosen to undergo further training in Britain and Van der Spuy was part of this group. When he passed his final examination on 2 June 1914, and was granted the certificate of the Royal Aero Club, he was South Africa's first qualified military pilot.

Early in 1915, van der Spuy was part of a group who were asked to establish a South African Aviation Corps in England and go to South West Africa to assist the South African forces under General Louis Botha.

Van der Spuy later became the first South African Air Force pilot, when he attested on 1 April 1921.
