= Rex Distin Martienssen =

South African architect

- Born: 26 February 1905; Queenstown, Cape Colony
- Died: 23 August 1942 (aged 37); Pretoria
- Citizenship: South Africa
- Education: University of Witwatersrand (M.Arch.)
- Occupation: Architect

Rex Distin Martienssen ARIBA CIAM (26 February 1905, Queenstown, Cape Colony – 23 August 1942, Pretoria) was a South African architect who was greatly influenced by Le Corbusier and spearheaded a modernist architectural movement in South Africa.

Because of his early death while training as a lieutenant in the South African Air Force in World War II, Martienssen was unable to implement many of his ideas, but he left a rich legacy of writings to posterity. He studied at the University of Witwatersrand and obtained a B.Arch. in 1930, an M.Arch in 1940 and a D.Litt. in 1941. He also became an Associate of the Royal Institute of British Architects in 1930 and in 1939 was elected President of the Transvaal Institute of Architects. He became a senior lecturer in architecture at the University of Witwatersrand and acted as temporary head of the department. He became a member of the Engineering Faculty in 1937 and of the Architecture Faculty in 1940. He travelled to Europe quite frequently to stay abreast of changes and new ideas. On one of his trips abroad in 1934 he met Le Corbusier, which was to be the start of an enduring friendship. In the same year Martienssen established a practice in Johannesburg, and designed his own home House Martienssen in Greenside – a house quite remarkable even by current standards.

He became co-editor of the South African Architectural Record in 1932 and published some 40 articles on Greek, Renaissance and modern architecture. His thesis, The Idea of Space in Greek Architecture, was published posthumously in 1956. In 1937 he was nominated by Le Corbusier and became a member of Congrès International d'Architecture Moderne.

Rex Martienssen was married to architect and historian Professor Heather Martienssen of the Witwatersrand University Fine Arts Department – the first woman professor at the university.

== Sources ==
- Standard Encyclopaedia of Southern Africa vol.7 (Nasou, Cape Town 1972) ISBN 0-625-00323-3
- Martienssen and the international style: The Modern Movement in South African Architecture, Gilbert Herbert, Balkema South Africa 1975
- Modernism in Africa, Uta Pottgieser and Ana Tostoes, Birkhauser 2025
