= Bellevue, Gauteng =

Bellevue
- Location within Gauteng Location within South Africa
- Coordinates: 26°10′45″S 28°04′03″E
- Country: South Africa
- Province: Gauteng
- Municipality: City of Johannesburg
- Main Place: Johannesburg
- Established: 1890

Area
  - Total: 0.43 km^{2} (0.17 sq mi)

Population (2011)
  - Total: 9,323
  - Density: 22,000/km^{2} (56,000/sq mi)

Racial makeup (2011)
  - Black African: 96.1%
  - Coloured: 1.7%
  - Indian/Asian: 0.5%
  - White: 1.6%
  - Other: 0.2%

First languages (2011)
  - Zulu: 26.7%
  - English: 23.0%
  - Southern Ndebele: 12.6%
  - Northern Sotho: 4.2%
  - Other: 33.5%
- Time zone: UTC+2 (SAST)
- Postal code (street): 8801

Bellevue is an inner city neighbourhood of Johannesburg, Gauteng Province, South Africa. Close to the Johannesburg CBD with the neighbourhood surrounded by Yeoville and Observatory. It is located in Region F of the City of Johannesburg Metropolitan Municipality. It shares the same praise and notoriety as its surrounding neighbourhood Yeoville.

The neighbourhood today is usually called Yeoville due to their very close proximity, same demographics and notoriety, leading to the whole area now known as Greater Yeoville, combining Bellevue, Bellevue East and Yeoville. It is home to the Yeoville Hotel.

== History ==
The suburb is situated on part of an old Witwatersrand farm called Doornfontein. It was established in 1890 and is either named after the land developer Bellevue Township Syndicate or the view of the city to the west and view to the Magaliesberg mountain range in the north.

== Culture ==
Rockey Street is known for its lively bars and clubs, a hotspot for black nightlife although has a bad reputation for public alcohol consumption and illegal street dealings such as guns and drugs. The neighbourhood shares all its characteristics (both positive and negative) with surrounding and adjacent Yeoville.
