= Chinese South Africans =

South Africans of Chinese descent

華裔南非人 华裔南非人

Total population
- 300,000 – 400,000 (2015, est.)

Regions with significant populations
- Durban · Johannesburg · Gqeberha · Cape Town

Languages
- English · Afrikaans · Cantonese · Mandarin · Hokkien

Related ethnic groups
- Overseas Chinese

Chinese South Africans (traditional Chinese: 華裔南非人; simplified Chinese: 华裔南非人) are Overseas Chinese who reside in South Africa, including those whose ancestors came to South Africa in the early 20th century until Chinese immigration was banned under the Chinese Exclusion Act of 1904. Significant numbers of Taiwanese industrialists immigrated to South Africa between the 1970s and early 1990s, and post-apartheid immigrants to South Africa (predominantly from mainland China) now outnumber locally-born Chinese South Africans. South Africa has the largest population of ethnic Chinese people in Africa, and most of them live in Johannesburg, an economic hub in southern Africa.

== History ==
South African Chinese Population, 1904–1936
Gender	1904	1911	1921	1936
Natal Province
Male	161	161	75	46
Female	4	11	33	36
Cape Province
Male	1366	804	584	782
Female	14	19	148	462
Transvaal Province
Male	907	905	828	1054
Female	5	5	160	564
Total	2457	1905	1828	2944

=== First settlers ===
The first Chinese to settle in South Africa were prisoners, usually debtors, who were sent from Batavia by the Dutch East India Company (VOC) to the Dutch Cape Colony. The VOC originally planned on recruiting Chinese immigrants to settle in the Cape Colony as farmers, thereby helping secure the colony's existence and create a tax base which would ensure the Cape Colony was less of a drain on Dutch coffers. However, the Dutch failed to find anyone in the Chinese community in Batavia who was prepared to volunteer to go to such a far off place. There were also some free Chinese settlers in the Cape Colony. They made a living through fishing and farming and traded their produce for other required goods. From 1660 until the late 19th century the number of Chinese people in the Cape Colony never exceeded 100.

Chinese people began arriving in large numbers in South Africa in the 1870s through to the early 20th century initially in hopes of making their fortune on the diamond and gold mines in Kimberley and the Witwatersrand respectively. Most were independent immigrants mostly coming from Canton Province. Due to anti-Chinese sentiment and racial discrimination at the time they were prevented from obtaining mining contracts and so became entrepreneurs and small business owners instead.

The Chinese community in South Africa grew steadily throughout the remainder of the 19th century, bolstered by new arrivals from China. The Second Boer War, fought between 1899 and 1902, pushed some Chinese South Africans out of the Witwatersrand and into areas such as Port Elizabeth and East London in the Eastern Cape. Areas recorded to have Chinese populations moving in to settle at the time include Pageview in Johannesburg that was declared a non-white area in the late 1800s and known as the "Malay Location" Large-scale immigration into South Africa during this time was prohibited by the Transvaal Immigration Restriction Act of 1902 and the Cape Chinese Exclusion Act of 1904. A host of discriminatory laws similar to the anti-Chinese laws that sought to restrict trade, land ownership and citizenship were also enacted during this time. These laws, similar to the earlier Chinese Exclusion Act in the United States, derived from widespread anti-Chinese sentiment across the Western world during the early 1900s and the arrival of over 60,000 indentured Chinese miners after the Second Boer War. These early immigrants arriving between the 1870s and early 1900s are the ancestors of most of South Africa's first Chinese community and number some 10,000 individuals today. In 1903, the Transvaal Chinese Association was formed to represent the interests of the 900 or so Chinese people who lived in the Transvaal province.

==== Contracted gold miners (1904–1910) ====
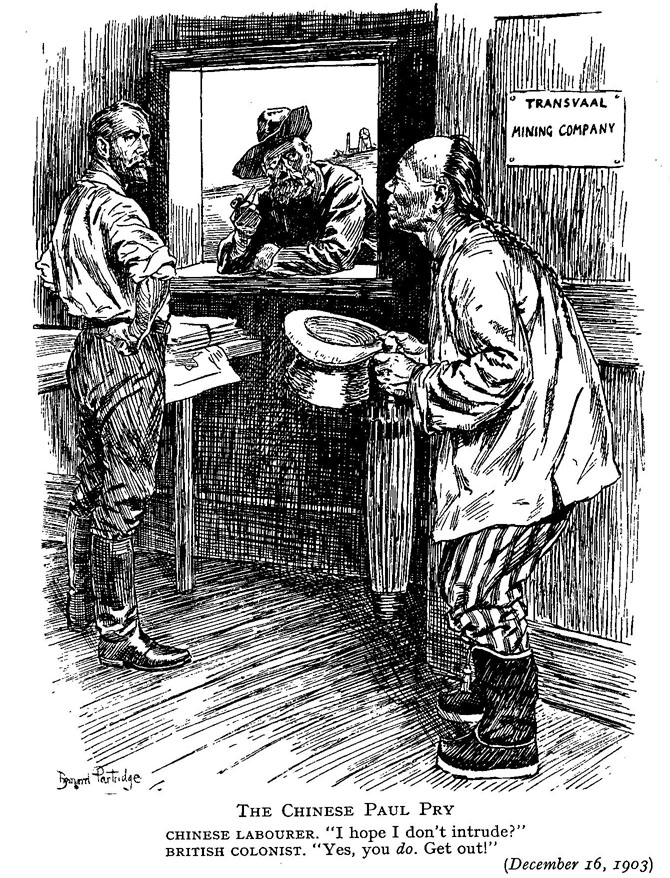
1903 Punch cartoon; the Randlord's employment of Chinese labour on the Transvaal gold mines was controversial and contributed to the Liberal victory in the 1906 UK general election.

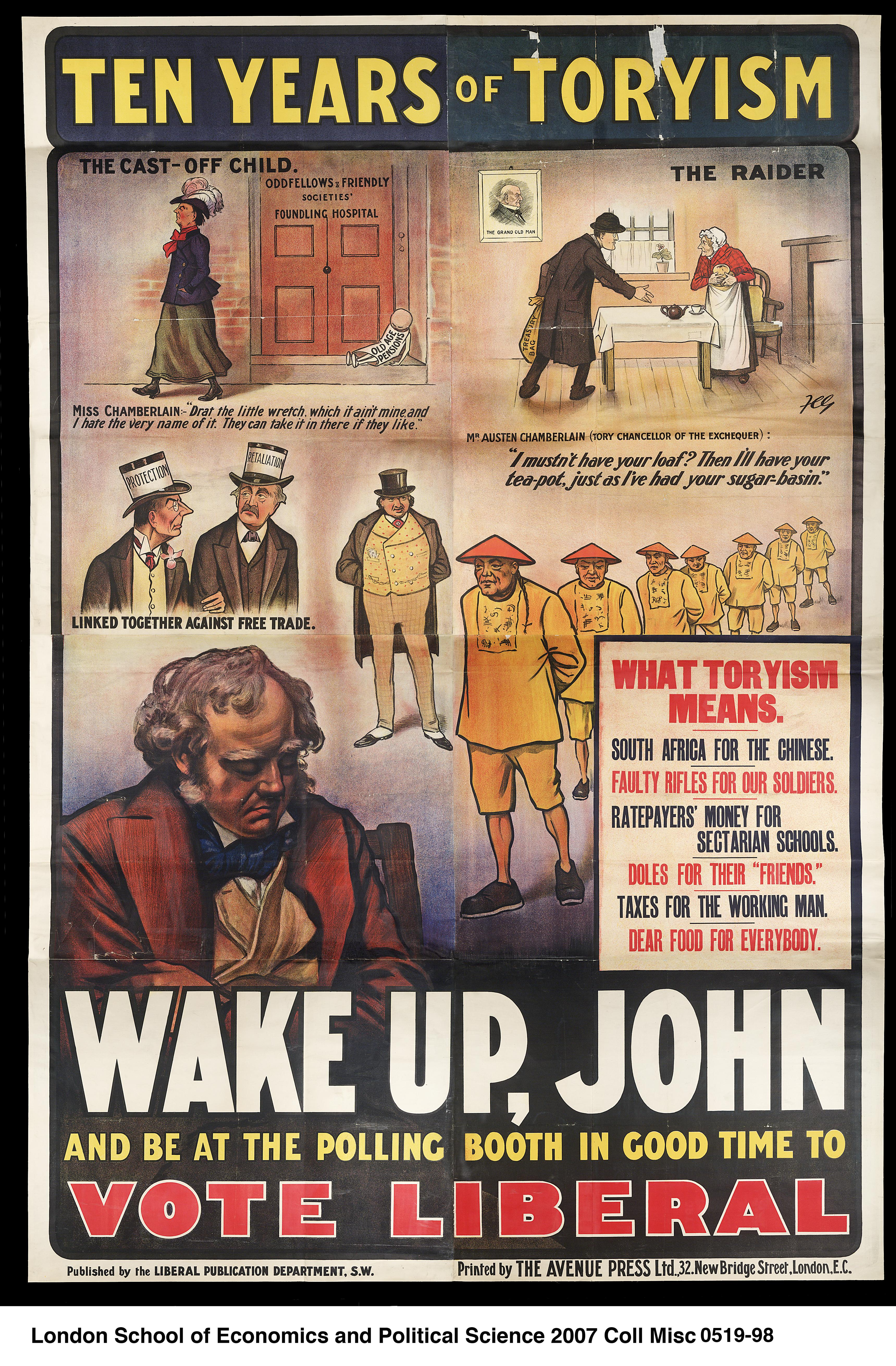
Liberal Party poster for the 1906 UK general election, criticizing the Conservative Party for supporting the introduction of indentured Chinese laborers into South Africa.

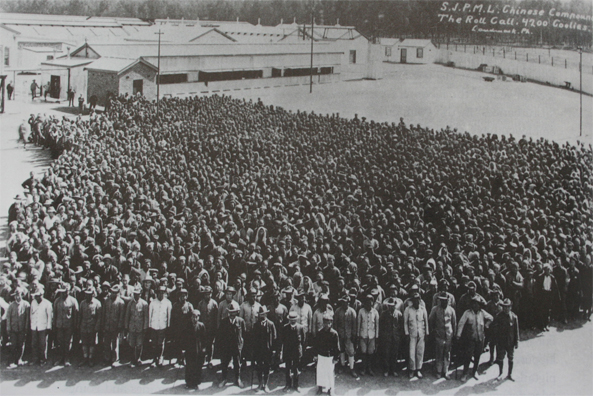
Around 4,200 miners at the Simmer and Jack mine on the Witwatersrand, taken between 1904 and 1910.

Following the end of the Second Boer War in 1902, production levels in Witwatersrand gold mines were generally low due to a lack of labour. Government officials and businessmen in South Africa were eager to restore pre-war production levels as part of their overall efforts to rebuild from wartime devastation. Due to the war, unskilled African laborers had returned to rural areas and were more inclined to work on rebuilding infrastructure as mining was more dangerous work. Unskilled white labour was being phased out because it was deemed too expensive; mine owners found recruiting and importing labour from China the most expedient way to solve this problem. Between 1904 and 1910, over 63,000 contracted miners were brought in to work in the Witwatersrand's mines. Most contractors were recruited from the Chinese provinces of Zhili, Shandong and Henan. From 1910 onwards they were repatriated to China due to strong opposition from white South Africans to their presence. It is a myth that the contracted miners brought into South Africa at this time are the forefathers of much of South Africa's Chinese population today.

Herbert Hoover, who would later become the 31st U.S. president, was a director of Chinese Engineering and Mining Company (CEMC) when it became a supplier of Chinese labour for South African mines. The first shipment of 2,000 Chinese workers arrived in Durban from Qinhuangdao in July 1904. By 1906, the total number of Chinese workers increased to 50,000, almost entirely recruited and shipped by CEMC. When the living and working conditions of the laborers became known, public opposition to the scheme grew and questions were asked in the British Parliament. The scheme was abandoned in 1911. The mass importation of Chinese labourers to work on the gold mines contributed to the fall from power of the conservative government in the United Kingdom. However, it did stimulate to the economic recovery of South Africa after the Second Boer War by once again making the mines of the Witwatersrand the most productive gold mines in the world.

=== Passive resistance campaign (1906–1913) ===
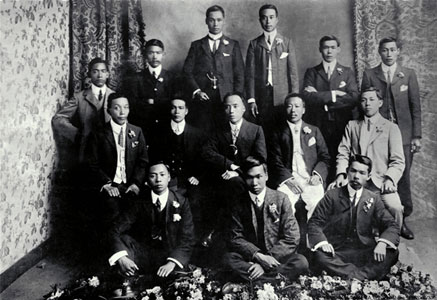
Chinese passive resistance leaders circa 1906

In 1906, about 1,000 Chinese joined Indian protesters led by Mahatma Gandhi to march against laws barring Asians in the Transvaal Colony from purchasing land. In 1907, the government of the Transvaal Colony passed the Transvaal Asiatic Registration Act that required the Indian and Chinese populations in the Transvaal to be registered and for males to be fingerprinted and carry pass books. The Transvaal Chinese Association made a written declaration saying that the Chinese would not register for passes and would not interact with those that did. Mahatma Gandhi started a campaign of passive resistance to protest the legislation that was supported by the Indian and Chinese communities. The secretary of the Chinese Association informed Gandhi that the Chinese were prepared to be jailed alongside Indians in support of this cause. On 16 August 1908, members of the movement gathered outside Hamidia Mosque where they burnt 1,200 registration certificates.

=== Apartheid era (1948–1994) ===
As with other non-White South Africans, the Chinese suffered from discrimination during apartheid, and were often classified as Coloureds, but sometimes as Asians, a category that was generally reserved for Indian South Africans. Today this segment of the South African Chinese population numbers some 10,000 individuals.

Under the apartheid-era Population Registration Act, 1950, Chinese South Africans were deemed "Asiatic", then "Coloured", and finally:

the Chinese Group, which shall consist of persons who in fact are, or who, except in the case of persons who in fact are members of a race or class or tribe referred to in paragraph (1), (2), (3), (5) or (6) are generally accepted as members of a race or tribe whose national home is in China.

Chinese South Africans, along with Black, Coloured and Indian South Africans, were forcefully removed from areas declared "Whites only" areas by the government under the Group Areas Act in 1950. Suburbs in Johannesburg with Chinese South African populations that were subject to forced removals include Sophiatown starting in 1955, Marabastad in 1969 and the adjacent suburbs of Pageview and Vrededorp, known colloquially as 'Fietas', in 1968. Chinese South Africans were also among those removed from the South End district of Port Elizabeth beginning in 1965. These removals resulted in the formation of a Chinese township in Port Elizabeth.

In 1966 the South African Institute of Race Relations described the negative effects of apartheid legislation on the Chinese community and the resulting brain drain:

No group is treated so inconsistently under South Africa's race legislation. Under the Immorality Act they are Non-White. The Group Areas Act says they are Coloured, subsection Chinese ... They are frequently mistaken for Japanese in public and have generally used White buses, hotels, cinemas and restaurants. But in Pretoria, only the consul-general's staff may use White buses .. Their future appears insecure and unstable. Because of past and present misery under South African laws, and what seems like more to come in the future, many Chinese are emigrating. Like many Coloured people who are leaving the country, they seem to favour Canada. Through humiliation and statutory discrimination South Africa is frustrating and alienating what should be a prized community.

In 1928, the liquor legislation was amended to allow Indian South Africans to purchase liquor. Following an amendment in 1962, other non-white South Africans could purchase alcohol, but not drink in white areas. In 1976, the law was amended to allow Chinese South Africans to drink alcohol in white areas.

In 1984, the Tricameral Parliament was established by the government to give Coloured and Indian South Africans a limited influence on South African politics. The Tricameral Parliament was criticised by anti-apartheid groups including the United Democratic Front, who promoted a boycott of the Tricameral Parliament elections, as it still excluded Black people and had very little political power in South Africa. The Chinese South African community refused to participate in this parliament. Previously, the Chinese Association had expelled a member who had been appointed to the President's Council, a body established to advise on constitutional reform.

=== Immigration from Taiwan ===
Number of Chinese granted permanent residence in South Africa 1985–1995
Date	Number
1985	1
1986	7
1987	133
1988	301
1989	483
1990	1422
1991	1981
1992	275
1993	1971
1994	869
1995	350
Total	7793

By citizenship 1994–95
Citizenship	1994	1995
Taiwan (ROC)	596	232
People's Republic of China	252	102
Hong Kong	21	16
Total	869	350

With the establishment of ties between apartheid South Africa and Taiwan (officially the Republic of China), KMT-affiliated Taiwanese Chinese (as well as some Hong Kongers from British Hong Kong) started migrating to South Africa from the late 1970s onward. Due to apartheid South Africa's desire to attract their investment in South Africa and the many poorer Bantustans within the country, they were exempt from many apartheid laws and regulations. This created a situation where South Africans of Chinese descent continued to be classified as Coloureds or Asians, whereas the Taiwanese Chinese and other East Asian expatriates (South Koreans and Japanese) were considered "honorary whites" and enjoyed most of the rights accorded to White South Africans.

The South African government also offered a number of economic incentives to investors from Taiwan seeking to set up factories and businesses in the country. These generous incentives ranged from "paying for relocation costs, subsidised wages for seven years, subsidised commercial rent for ten years, housing loans, cheap transport of goods to urban areas, and favourable exchange rates".

In 1984, South African Chinese, now increased to about 10,000, finally obtained the same official rights as the Japanese in South Africa, that is, to be treated as whites in terms of the Group Areas Act. The arrival of the Taiwanese resulted in a surge of the ethnic Chinese population of South Africa, which climbed from around 10,000 in the early 1980s to at least 20,000 in the early 1990s. Many Taiwanese were entrepreneurs who set up small companies, particularly in the textile sector, across South Africa. It is estimated that by the end of the early 1990s Taiwanese industrialists had invested $2 billion (or $2.94 billion in 2011 dollars) in South Africa and employed roughly 50,000 people.

In the late 1990s and the first decade of the 21st century many of the Taiwanese left South Africa, in part due to official recognition of the People's Republic of China and a post-apartheid crime wave that swept the country. Numbers dropped from a high of around 30,000 Taiwanese citizens in the mid-1990s to the current population of approximately 6,000 today.

=== Post-Apartheid ===
Following the end of apartheid in 1994, mainland Chinese began immigrating to South Africa in large numbers, increasing the Chinese population in South Africa to an estimated 300,000-400,000 in 2015. In Johannesburg, in particular, a new Chinatown has emerged in the eastern suburbs of Cyrildene and Bruma Lake, replacing the declining one in the city centre. A Chinese housing development has also been established in the small town of Bronkhorstspruit, east of Pretoria, as well as a massive new "city" in development in Johannesburg.

In 2017 the trade union COSATU issued an apology for racially charged remarks made by COSATU protesters towards a Chinese South African Johannesburg city councillor, Michael Sun. In 2022 eleven people were found guilty of hate speech towards Chinese South Africans on Facebook following the airing of a Carte Blanche documentary on the inhumane treatment of donkeys slaughtered for use in traditional medicine in the People's Republic of China.

==== Black Economic Empowerment ruling ====
Under apartheid, some Chinese South Africans were discriminated against in various forms by the apartheid government. However, they were originally excluded from benefiting under the Black Economic Empowerment (BEE) programmes of the new South African government. This changed in mid-2008 when, in a case brought by the Chinese Association of South Africa, the Pretoria division of the High Court of South Africa ruled that Chinese South Africans who were South African citizens before 1994, as well as their descendants, qualify as previously disadvantaged individuals as Coloureds, and therefore are eligible to benefit under BEE and other affirmative action policies and programmes. The Chinese Association of South Africa was represented by human rights lawyer George Bizos in court during the case. However, Chinese South Africans who immigrated to the country after 1994 will be ineligible to benefit under the policies. In September 2015, Department of Trade and Industry deputy director general Sipho Zikode clarified who the ruling was meant to benefit. He said that not all Chinese in South Africa were eligible for BEE. He confirmed that only Chinese who were South African citizens prior to 1994, numbering "about 10,000" were eligible.

The negative response following Chinese Association of South Africa's (CASA) initial announcement of success in their affirmative action case against the new South African government highlights the prevailing confusion and internal discord among most South Africans regarding the role of the Chinese in South African society. A trend followed where both criminals and corrupt officials disproportionately target Chinese and South Asian migrants, in contrast to the typical focus of violence on migrants from other African nations in South Africa. The heightened incidences of robberies and hate crimes against Chinese south Africans could be associated with their greater representation in the retail sector.

=== Immigration of mainland Chinese ===
A "China shop" in Porterville, Western Cape, South Africa in 2010. Since the early 2000s many such shops, usually general dealers, have opened up in rural areas by Chinese immigrants from mainland China.

The immigration of mainland Chinese, by far the largest group of Chinese in South Africa, can be divided into three periods. The first group arrived in the late 1980s and early 1990s along with the Taiwanese immigrants. Unlike the Taiwanese immigrants, lacking the capital to start larger firms, most established small businesses. Although becoming relatively prosperous a large number of this group left South Africa, either back to China or to more developed Western countries, around the same time and for much the same reason as the Taiwanese immigrants left. The second group, arriving mostly from Jiangsu and Zhejiang provinces in the 1990s, were wealthier, better educated, and very entrepreneurial. The latest and ongoing group began arriving after 2000 and primarily made up of small traders and peasants from Fujian province. There are also many Chinese from other regions in China. As of 2013, there were 57 different regional Chinese associations operating in the Cyrildene Chinatown.

==== Disputes within the Chinese community ====
Tensions among the Chinese community in South Africa have deep historical roots, with early Cantonese and Hakka settlers residing in separate regions until apartheid laws compelled coexistence. Later, conflicts escalated due to the arrival of Taiwanese immigrants engaging in controversial behaviours. Chinese South Africans, frustrated by being wrongly associated with these actions, expressed anger and a desire to distance themselves from the negative image created by the Taiwanese newcomers.

Over time, the animosity shifted from Taiwanese to Fujianese migrants, who are now the primary target of hostility. Despite South Africans perceiving the Chinese as a singular group, internal divisions persist, particularly between settled Chinese and newer Fujianese migrants, contributing to misunderstandings and occasional difficulties.

== Notable Chinese South Africans ==
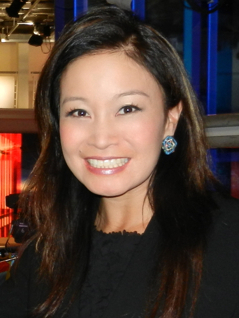
Jennifer Su

- Patrick Soon-Shiong (黃馨祥), surgeon and billionaire
- Chad Ho, six-time titleholder for the Midmar Mile
- Chris Wang (王翊儒), former member of the National Assembly, originally an MP for the ID, now a member of the ANC
- Eugenia Chang, member of the National Assembly, for the Inkatha Freedom Party
- Ina Lu (呂怡慧), Miss Chinese International 2006
- Sherry Chen (陈阡蕙), former Member of Parliament in South Africa, member of the Democratic Alliance
- Shiaan-Bin Huang (黄士豪), Member of Parliament of South Africa, member of the African National Congress
- Shannon Kook, actor
- Jennifer Su, television and radio personality
- Xiaomei Havard, member of the National Assembly, member of the African National Congress
- David Kan, businessman and founder of the electronics company Mustek.
- Lawrence Ah Mon (劉國昌), film director
- Michele B. Chan, actress

== See also ==
- Chinatowns in Africa
- Asians in South Africa
- History of South Africa
- Overseas Chinese
- Nan Hua Temple
- China–South Africa relations
- South Africa-Taiwan relations
