= Dewetshof =

- Dewetshof's location in Gauteng
- Coordinates: 26°11′S 28°06′E
- Country: South Africa
- Province: Gauteng
- City: Johannesburg

Area
  - Total: 1.37 km^{2} (0.53 sq mi)

Population (2011)
  - Total: 1,425
  - Density: 1,040/km^{2} (2,700/sq mi)

Races
  - White: 38.4%
  - Asian: 10.6%
  - Cape Coloured: 13.4%
  - Black: 36.6%
  - Other: 1.1%

Languages
  - English: 59.4%
  - Afrikaans: 14.2%
  - Zulu: 6.0%
  - Xhosa: 3.5%
  - Other: 16.9%

Dewetshof is a suburb of Johannesburg, South Africa.

It lies around 5.5 km northeast of City Hall between Observatory and Cyrildene, north of Observatory Hill. It borders Bezuidenhout Valley on the southwest, Kensington on the south, and Bruma on the southeast. In November 2017, the real estate website property24.com listed 23 homes for sale in Dewetshof, 15 selling for more than R2 million. The most expensive was R3.85 million and the cheapest at R1.39 million.

== History ==
Dewetshof is named for Chief Justice of South Africa Nicolaas Jacobus de Wet. Johannesburg City Council laid it out as plot No. 24 of Doornfontein Farm, and it was officially founded on December 1, 1954. The streets are named for famous people and ships from the early history of South Africa, including Dias, Tulbagh, De Mist, Da Gama, Woltemade en Adam Tas.
