= Jukskei River =

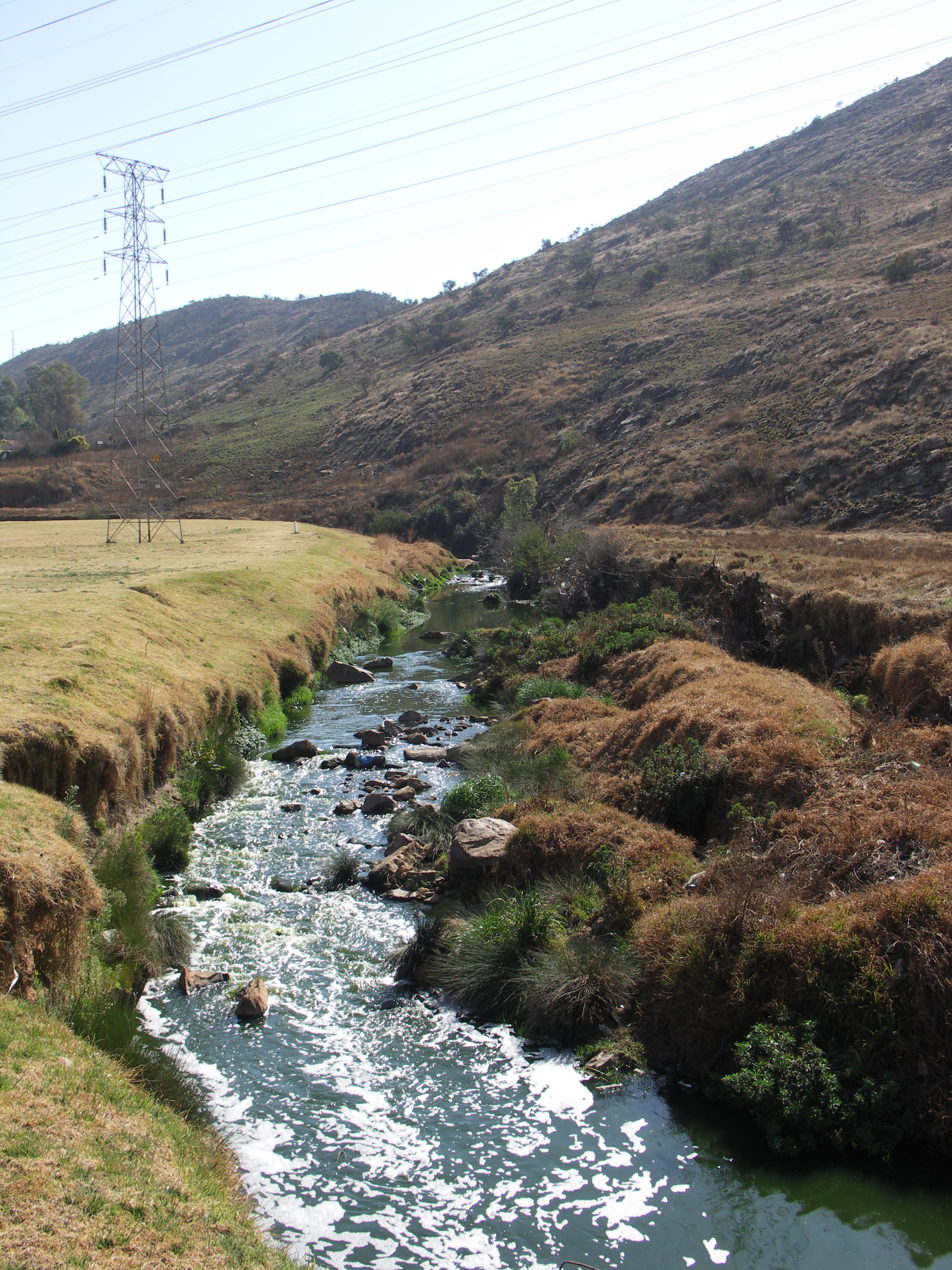
- Jukskei flowing past Gillooly's Farm

- Location of the Jukskei River mouth

Location
- Country: South Africa
- Province: Gauteng

Physical characteristics
- Source: Natural Spring
  - location: Ellis Park, Johannesburg, South Africa
  - coordinates: 26.196°S 28.064°E
- Mouth: Crocodile River
  - coordinates: 25°52′34″S 27°55′38″E
  - elevation: 1,234 m (4,049 ft)
- Discharge
  - location: Crocodile River
  - average: 120 m^{3}/s (4,200 cu ft/s)

The Jukskei River is one of the largest rivers in Johannesburg, South Africa. It is the southernmost river in the Crocodile River basin.

== Course ==
The Jukskei begins in Ellis Park in Johannesburg. Its original spring was on the former Doornfontein farm, which measured at 18,000 litres per hour, but has since disappeared under subsequent urban development. Now the first surface expression of the Jukskei is in Bertrams at the intersection of Queen Street and Sports Avenue where it emerges from a storm drain. From there the river flows through Bezuidenhout Valley and Bruma. It then meanders in a northerly direction through Bedfordview and Edenvale before flowing through Alexandra Township. It then turns northwest and flows through Marlboro, Buccleuch, Leeuwkop Prison, Lone Hill, Dainfern and Steyn City before joining the Crocodile River outside Lanseria.

== Tributaries ==
The Jukskei River is joined by numerous streams along its course with its major tributaries being the Modderfontein Spruit, Braamfontein Spruit and the Klein-Jukskei. The Jukskei River provides the largest amount of water, by discharge, into the Crocodile River basin.

== Character ==
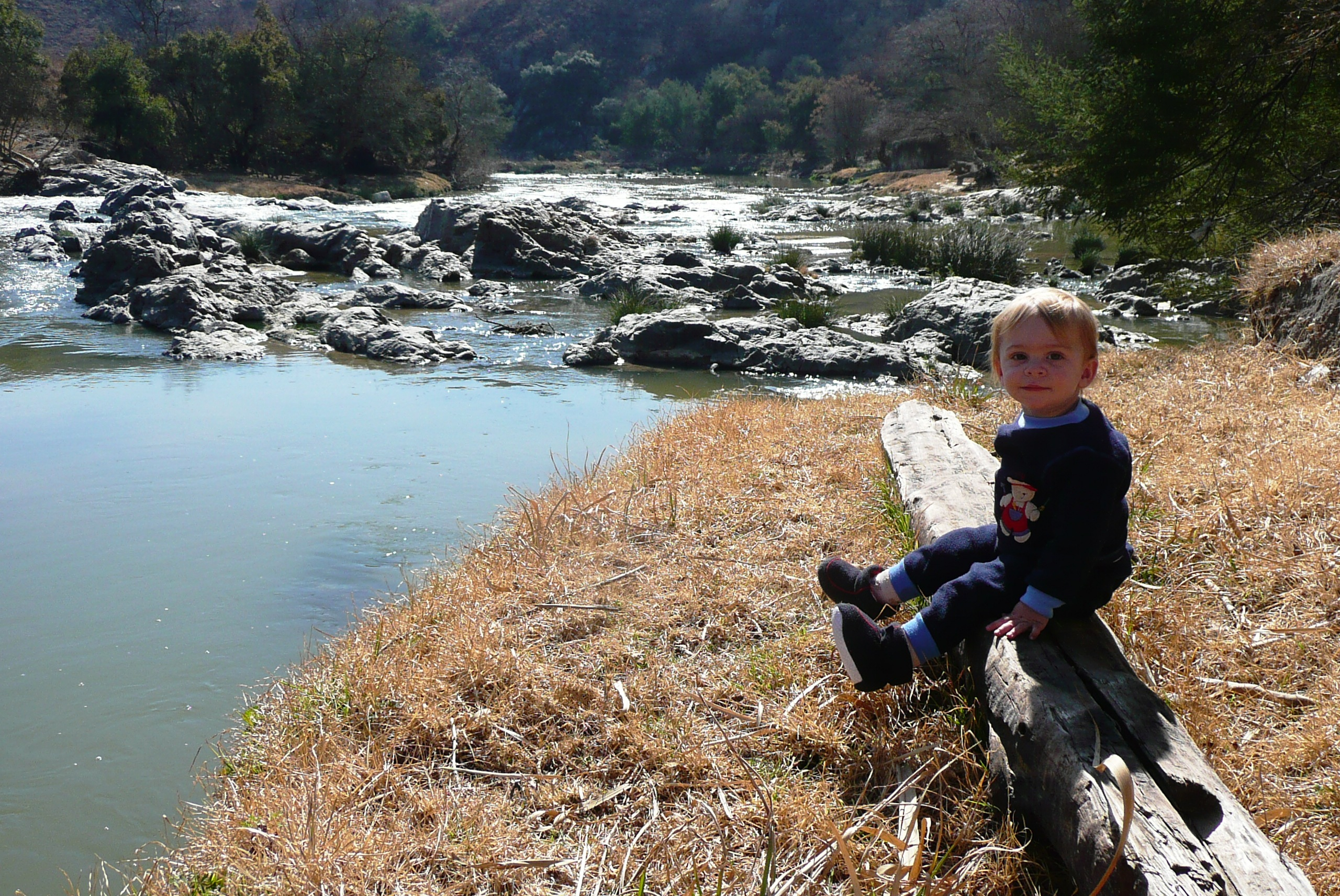
A South African girl sitting on a log next to the Jukskei River

The Jukskei is mostly shallow and not deep enough for transportation. It is also heavily polluted by urban runoff. Lack of infrastructure maintenance has let raw waste flow into the river on a daily basis. Cholera-causing bacteria have occasionally been found in the river. The river receives a large inflow from the Northern Waste Water Treatment Plant in northern Johannesburg. The Jukskei River is one of the largest contributing factors of the eutrophication problems facing Hartbeespoort Dam further down stream. Tons of waste such as plastic, metal and rubber flow down the river annually.

The banks are prone to bursting, especially in summer when rainfalls are the heaviest for the year regionally. This spells disaster for the impoverished residents of the Alexandra Township who often build makeshift shacks along the river banks owing to overcrowding and the need for access to water for washing, drinking, and cooking.

== Cultural and sporting significance ==
The Jukskei traditionally demarcated the boundary between the Northern Transvaal and Transvaal for sporting purposes, and teams like the Titans cricket team and Blue Bulls (formerly Northern Transvaal) continue to be headquartered in Pretoria, north of the Jukskei.

== See also ==
- List of rivers of South Africa
- List of reservoirs and dams in South Africa
