= Judith's Paarl =

- Location within Gauteng Location within South Africa
- Coordinates: 26.1904°S 28.0722°E
- Country: South Africa
- Province: Gauteng
- Municipality: City of Johannesburg
- Main Place: Johannesburg
- Established: 1896

Area
  - Total: 0.30 km^{2} (0.12 sq mi)

Population (2011)
  - Total: 2,453
  - Density: 8,200/km^{2} (21,000/sq mi)

Racial makeup (2011)
  - Black African: 81.2%
  - Coloured: 4.5%
  - Indian/Asian: 8.8%
  - White: 2.4%
  - Other: 3.0%

First languages (2011)
  - Zulu: 29.9%
  - English: 17.5%
  - Xhosa: 8.0%
  - Southern Ndebele: 6.3%
  - Other: 38.4%
- Time zone: UTC+2 (SAST)
- Postal code (street): 2094

Judith's Paarl is a suburb of Johannesburg, South Africa. It is a small suburb found on the eastern edge of the Johannesburg central business district (CBD), tucked between the suburbs of Lorentzville and Bezuidenhout Valley, with Troyeville and Kensington to the south. It is located in Region F of the City of Johannesburg Metropolitan Municipality.

== History ==
The suburb was founded on one of the original farms on the Witwatersrand, after a strip of land was sold from the farm Doornfontein. It originates around 1896. The suburb is possibly named after a daughter of the Lorentz family. Other sources are Judith Cornelia Estresia, wife of the original farmer owner F.C. Bezuidenhout. It had a terminus for the Johannesburg tramway network on the corner of Ascot Road and First Street.

For much of the twentieth century, along with Yeoville, it established itself as a hub for middle-class Jewish residents. These residents had usually arrived with earlier waves of Jewish migration from Europe and had established social and financial security in their adopted home.
