= Novus Holdings =

South African holding company

- Formerly: Paarl Media Group
- Type: Public
- Traded as: JSE: NVS
- ISIN: ZAE000202149
- Industry: Investment holdings
- Incorporated: 2008; 18 years ago
- Founded: 2000; 26 years ago
- Headquarters: Cape Town, South Africa
- Area served: South Africa
- Key people: André van der Veen (CEO); Adrian Zetler (Chairman)
- Products: Newspapers; Books; Magazines; Packaging; Labels
- Services: Printing; Publishing; Distribution; Educational content Packaging; Logistics
- Revenue: ▼ R4.19 billion (2026)
- Operating income: ▼ R342.9 million (2026)
- Net income: ▼ R266.1 million (2026)
- Total assets: ▼ R3.92 billion (2026)
- Total equity: ▲ R2.56 billion (2026)
- Number of employees: 1,940 (2026)
- Divisions: Novus Print; Publishing & Distribution; Novus Education; Novus Packaging
- Subsidiaries: Maskew Miller Learning; Novus Print; Novus Packaging; On the Dot; Novus Media; Novus Sport
- Website: novus.holdings

Novus Holdings is a South African JSE-listed holding company, with investments in packaging, logistics, and print media, including newspapers, books, and magazines. Founded in 2000, Novus is headquartered in Cape Town.

== History ==
Novus' history dates to 1905, when the first issue of the Paarl Post newspaper was published in the Western Cape town of Paarl. The business remained under the Retief family for much of the 20th century and expanded from newspaper printing into other forms of commercial printing.

In 2000, the business was reorganized as the Paarl Media Group following the merger of National Magazine Printers and Paarl Web, with Lambert Retief becoming its first CEO.

Between 2001 and 2005, the group acquired National Book Printers and Paarl Print, which were consolidated into Paarl Printing. It subsequently expanded its printing operations through further acquisitions and investments, including the acquisition of Print24 and Paarl Post from Media24 in the second half of the 2000s.

In 2000, Media24 acquired a joint controlling interest in Paarl Media and Paarl Coldset from the Retief family. Media24 subsequently acquired sole control of the businesses in 2014, before the printing operations were separated from Media24 and listed as a standalone company.

In 2015, the Paarl Media Group was renamed Novus Holdings and listed on the JSE on 31 March. The listing raised over R1.15 billion and was intended to support the group's expansion and diversification beyond its traditional printing operations.

Two months after its listing, Novus acquired Cape Town-based Digital Print Solutions, establishing a digital printing division. The acquisition expanded the group's capabilities in on-demand book printing, among other services.

In 2017, Novus acquired ITB Manufacturing, a KwaZulu-Natal manufacturer of flexible plastic packaging, marking a further diversification of the group.

In 2019, Novus consolidated its printing businesses under the Novus Print name and acquired three publishing businesses; 3S Media, Famous Publishing, and a 49% interest in Mikateko Media. The acquisitions expanded the group's activities further into magazine publishing and content production.

In 2020, Novus restructured its printing operations in response to declining print demand. It consolidated sheet-fed operations into its Montague Gardens facility and closed its KwaZulu-Natal sheet-fed printing facility. The group also disposed of a controlling interest in its tissue paper business, retaining a minority interest in Mthembu Paper Mill, located in Durban.

In November 2022, Novus acquired a 75% stake in Pearson South Africa, which was subsequently renamed Maskew Miller Learning. The acquisition created the Novus Education business, and expanded the group into educational content development.

In 2024, Novus acquired a minority stake in Bytefuse, an artificial intelligence company, as part of its strategy to diversify into technology. Novus said the investment was partly motivated by Bytefuse's work in improving the educational services of Maskew Miller Learning.

In November 2024, Novus acquired more than 35% of the shares in tech distributor Mustek, resulting in a mandatory offer for the remaining shares. The proposed acquisition became subject to regulatory proceedings involving the Takeover Regulation Panel and the Competition Commission, with Novus continuing to pursue control of Mustek in 2025.

In May 2026, Novus settled its dispute with the Takeover Regulation Panel, agreeing to increase its mandatory offer to R15.41 per Mustek share, an 18.5% increase over the original R13 offer. In September that same year, Novus increased its shareholding in Mustek to 57.63%.

== Operations ==
As of 2026, Novus Holdings operates through three core divisions:

Division	Principal businesses	Activities	Ref
Novus Print, Publishing & Distribution	Novus Print; Novus Media; Novus Sport; On the Dot Supply Chain Management	Commercial printing; community newspaper and sports publishing; media distribution; logistics and supply chain management	
Novus Education	Maskew Miller Learning	Educational publishing and content development for schools, technical and vocational education and training, higher education, and professional learning	
Novus Packaging	Novus Packaging; Novus Labels; ITB Flexible Packaging Solutions; Plaslope	Flexible packaging and label printing for the beverage, petrochemical, FMCG, industrial, and retail markets	

The group's legal subsidiaries include:

- Novus Print Proprietary Limited
- Maskew Miller Learning Proprietary Limited
- Novus Packaging Proprietary Limited
- Ibuyit Proprietary Limited
- Molakai Investments Proprietary Limited
- Plaslope Proprietary Limited
- Integrity Control Systems Proprietary Limited
- On the Dot Supply Chain Management Proprietary Limited
- Namibie Nuus-Distribueerdes Proprietary Limited
- Novus Media Proprietary Limited
- Novus Sport Proprietary Limited
