= The Chinese Association of Gauteng =

Cultural organisation in South Africa

- Formation: 1903; 123 years ago
- Founded at: Transvaal Colony
- Headquarters: 13 Commissioner Street, Johannesburg, 2046, South Africa
- Location: Johannesburg, South Africa
- Region served: Gauteng
- Website: www.tcagp.co.za
- Formerly called: Transvaal Chinese Association

The Chinese Association of Gauteng (Chinese: 杜省中華公會) is a South African organisation that advocates for the interests of Chinese South Africans. The organisation was formed in 1903 as the Transvaal Chinese Association (TCA) in the Transvaal Colony when approximately 900 Chinese people lived in the colony.

In the early years of its existence, the TCA, together with the Transvaal British Indian Association and Mahatma Gandhi, lead the opposition campaign against the Asiatic Registration Act which required the registration of Indian and Chinese people living in the Transvaal Colony. The TCA's campaigns initially involved passive resistance against the government. However, the TCA later took a more moderate approach to campaigning, with methods including petitioning the government to request more rights for Chinese people during Apartheid after the Transvaal Colony became the Transvaal Province of South Africa.

== History ==
In 1906, the Transvaal Colony government published the Draft Asiatic Amendment Ordinance of 1906. The bill would lead to the creation of a detailed register of Chinese and Indian people living in the colony. In response, the TCA sent a group of representatives accompanied by the consul of the Qing dynasty in the Transvaal to London to oppose the bill. The governor of the colony ultimately rejected the bill in November 1906. However, in 1907, the Het Volk party was elected in the Transvaal Colony. The new Transvaal government passed the Asiatic Registration Act in 1907 which again required Indian and Chinese people in the colony to register.

In 1908, the TCA sent a letter to the Chinese embassy in London, asking for Chinese people to be exempted from the Asiatic Registration Act. The TCA claimed that unlike British Indian people, Chinese people in the colony were not subjects of the British Empire. The same year, it was reported that only two Chinese people in Johannesburg had registered under the act. One returned to China and the other committed suicide after learning that his registration would not allow him to remain in the colony. The TCA covered his funeral expenses. The leader of the TCA at the time, Leung Quinn, said that the Transvaal Government was responsible for the "murder of an innocent man". Mahatma Gandhi attended the funeral and spoke in opposition to the law.

On 20 and 21 February 1909 respectively, Quinn and Gandhi were arrested and jailed for refusing to produce their registration certificates. They were two of over 2000 Asians who were convicted under the act. Quinn and his supporters' passive resistance caused a rift in the TCA and Quinn went to court to obtain an interdict to prevent members of the association from using funds meant to support the passive resistance campaign for other purposes. Quinn formed the Chinese Resistance Union in order to continue the passive resistance campaign. The factions remained in conflict and it was reported that members of the association had a gunfight on the streets of Johannesburg.

On 18 May 1910, Quinn was arrested and deported to Colombo, Ceylon. In January 1911, Quinn returned from Ceylon and arrived in Durban in the newly formed Union of South Africa. He was again arrested after crossing the border into what was now the Transvaal Province and sentenced to three months hard labour. After his release, he resigned as chairman of the TCA.

In 1911, the Transvaal government and Asians in the colony reached a provisional agreement. The government allowed several concessions including the exemption of educated persons from registering and the requirement for signatures instead of fingerprints for registration. In 1912, the Chinese community's passive resistance campaign came to an end after Quinn suddenly left the TCA without handing over the association's books or money. Gandhi later wrote of Quinn's disappearance that "it is always difficult for followers to sustain a conflict in the absence of their leader, and the shock is all the greater when the leader has disgraced himself". That year, the TCA ceased to exist.

The TCA existed intermittently and reformed to advocate for rights for Chinese people at various times throughout the 20th century including after the passing of the Group Areas Act. From the 1980s, the TCA became an important cultural association for Chinese South Africans in the Gauteng province, hosting large celebrations for its community and publishing a newsletter.

In 2017, the TCA instituted proceedings against 12 people who made discriminatory comments about Chinese people on Facebook. In 2022, the court found that the comments constituted hate speech and ordered the defendants to make apologies and pay R50,000 each to a Chinese old age home. In October 2022, the Kathrada Foundation presented their Anti-Racism Award to the TCA for their work in promoting nonracialism in South Africa.
