= Chris Wang =

Chris Wang may refer to:

- Chris Wang (politician)
- Chris Wang (actor)
