= Chinatowns in Africa =

African Chinatowns

Chinatown
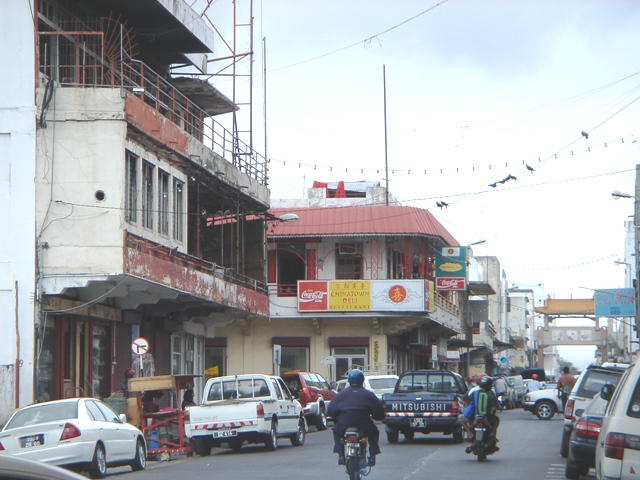
- Port Louis Chinatown
- Chinese: 唐人街
- Hakka: Tongˇ nginˇ gieˊ
Transcriptions
Standard Mandarin
- Hanyu Pinyin: Tángrénjiē
Hakka
- Romanization: Tongˇ nginˇ gieˊ

Alternative Chinese name
- Traditional Chinese: 中國城
- Simplified Chinese: 中国城
- Hakka: Zungˊ guedˋ sangˇ
Transcriptions
Standard Mandarin
- Hanyu Pinyin: Zhōngguóchéng
Hakka
- Romanization: Zungˊ guedˋ sangˇ

Second alternative Chinese name
- Traditional Chinese: 華埠
- Simplified Chinese: 华埠
- Hakka: Faˇ pu
Transcriptions
Standard Mandarin
- Hanyu Pinyin: Huábù
Hakka
- Romanization: Faˇ pu

This article discusses Chinatowns in Africa. There are at least three major Chinatowns in Africa.

As former colonies of Europe, the coastal African nations of Madagascar, Mauritius, and South Africa were the main receiving points of Chinese immigrants from the 1890s to the early part of the 20th century. The early Chinese arrived to labour in the Transvaal gold mines of South Africa and on the Tananrive Tamatave railway of Madagascar. Many of these Chinese immigrants were exploited.

Today, South Africa remains the top African destination for first-generation Chinese-speaking immigrants.

== Kenya ==
In the capital Nairobi, there is a small pocket of Chinese businesses along Argwings Kodhek Road in the Kilimani district, near the Chaka Place shopping center. There is a newer Chinatown with a larger collection of businesses on the former campus of Baraton University's Nairobi extension campus.

== Madagascar ==
Madagascar has received some Chinese immigrants. In Madagascar, there are about 30,000 Chinese, the majority of them came from the Pearl River Delta in Guangdong. A Chinatown, called Quartier chinois, is located in Antananarivo.

== Mauritius ==
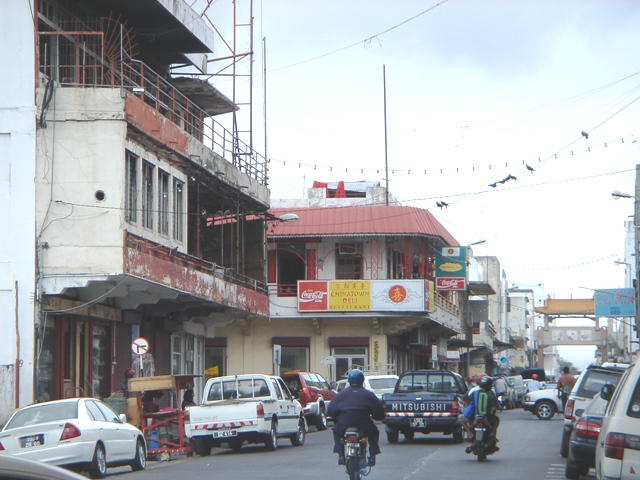
Port Louis Chinatown

The Chinatown or Quartier chinois is in the city of Port Louis on rue Royale. The Hakka Chinese are the dominant group among the Chinese in Mauritius. The Chinatown of Port Louis is one of the oldest in Africa. In the 1780s, thousands of Chinese migrated to Mauritius and quickly formed a small Chinatown, the "Camp des chinois", in Port Louis. The Chinatown of Port Louis hosts a very popular "Chinese Food and Cultural Festival" every year, which is appreciated by Mauritians of all communities.

== Namibia ==
There is a small Chinese district, supermarket, and arch in Windhoek.

== Nigeria ==
China Town, a Chinese-dominated business arena in the Ojota area of Lagos. The giant shopping centre, which sits on an expanse of land measuring 20,000 square metres, will no longer be for only economic activities. It will also help facilitate robust bilateral relationships between Nigerians and the Chinese people.

== South Africa ==
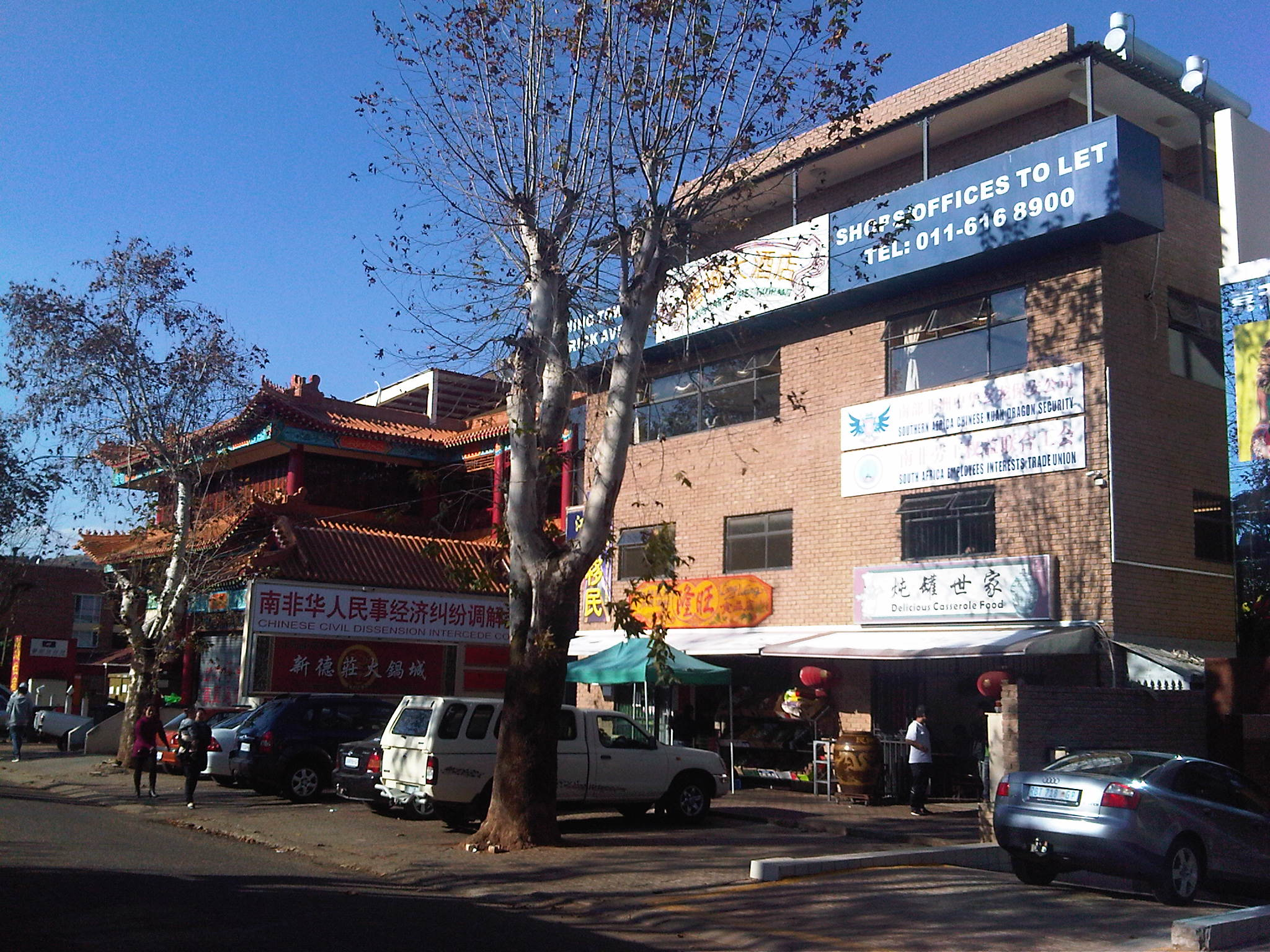
A street scene of the Chinatown in Cyrildene, Johannesburg.

Inner-city Johannesburg has a Chinatown on Commissioner Street, but a newer Chinatown can be found on Derrick Avenue in the hilly suburb of Cyrildene. Most of the inhabitants of the Cyrildene Chinatown are recent immigrants from mainland China. A Chinatown also exists in the city of Port Elizabeth with the first settlement located in the South End district of the city until the Apartheid government forcibly removed the Chinese from the district. The Chinese were later removed to Kabega Park area.

In the late 1970s and throughout the 1980s immigrants from Taiwan settled extensively in South Africa. South Africa's first Taiwan-born legislator was elected in the 1980s. After South Africa recognised the People's Republic of China in 1998 large numbers of mainland Chinese immigrated to the country. South African Chinese are dispersed throughout South African cities. During the Apartheid regime (1948–93) Chinese South Africans were classified as "Coloureds" or "Asian South Africans", while certain East Asian nationals (such as Japan and Taiwan) in South Africa were declared honorary whites and thus avoided most forms of official discriminatory laws (they could live in reserved white neighborhoods unlike native/black, and Asian-Indian South Africans), since Apartheid created a strict racial segregation system for non-white/European persons (esp. the black majority) in South Africa.

== "Africatowns" in China ==
- Africans in Guangzhou, with African expatriates of African Chinese people.
