= Freedom Forum (disambiguation) =

Freedom Forum is a nonpartisan foundation dedicated to free press and free speech.

Freedom Forum may also refer to:

- Free Forum, a political party in Slovakia
- Oslo Freedom Forum, a series of global conferences run by the Human Rights Foundation

== See also ==
- Fourth Freedom Forum, a nonpartisan foundation concerned with global security threats
- Five Freedoms Forum, a former group of anti-apartheid organizations
