= Sophie Masite =

Mayor of City of Johannesburg Southern Metropolitan Substructure

Sophie Mpisang Masite
- Born: 1958
- Died: 1997 (aged 38–39)
- Occupation: Mayor of Soweto

Sophie Masite (1958 – 1997) was a South African anti-apartheid activist, and the first woman to be mayor of Soweto.

== Early life ==
Sophie Mpuisang Masite was born in 1958 in Soweto, Johannesburg.

== Activism ==
She was part of the 1976 generation of activists as a member of the Soweto Student Representative Council, where she played a leading role in the organisation of the protests against the apartheid state during the Soweto uprising.

Masite was a leader in many mass democratic organisations, including the Detainees' Parents' support Committee, an affiliate of the UDM. she also led the Jabavu Branch of the ANC between 1990 and 1994.She led the rent boycott in the 1980s, but insisted on payment for services when the political motivation for the boycott ended.

== Mayorship ==
Masite became the first black female mayor in South Africa when she was appointed to the greater Johannesburg's Southern Council in 1995. the council consisted of the CBD and its southern suburbs of Soweto, Orange Farm, Lenasia and Ennerdale.

== Death and legacy ==
Masite died at the age of 38 in April 1997. She was buried in Avalon Cemetery on 1 May 1997, along with many other former anti-apartheid activists.

On 25 of September 2010, she was commemorated with a service and memorial unveiled by the City of Johannesburg and the Masite family.
