= Lorentzville =

- Location within Gauteng Location within South Africa
- Coordinates: 26.190°S 28.069°E
- Country: South Africa
- Province: Gauteng
- Municipality: City of Johannesburg
- Main Place: Johannesburg
- Established: 1892

Area
  - Total: 0.40 km^{2} (0.15 sq mi)

Population (2011)
  - Total: 3,032
  - Density: 7,600/km^{2} (20,000/sq mi)

Racial makeup (2011)
  - Black African: 90.0%
  - Coloured: 4.8%
  - Indian/Asian: 2.8%
  - White: 2.3%
  - Other: 0.1%

First languages (2011)
  - Zulu: 27.5%
  - English: 19.2%
  - Southern Ndebele: 10.2%
  - Xhosa: 7.4%
  - Other: 35.6%
- Time zone: UTC+2 (SAST)
- Postal code (street): 2094

Lorentzville is a suburb of Johannesburg, South Africa. It is a small suburb found on the eastern edge of the Johannesburg central business district (CBD), tucked between the suburbs of Bertrams and Judith's Paarl, with Troyeville to the south. It is located in Region F of the City of Johannesburg Metropolitan Municipality.

== History ==
The suburb was founded on one of the original farms on the Witwatersrand, after a strip of land was sold from the farm Doornfontein. The suburbs name has its origins in the name of the Lorentz family, who had lived both in Pretoria and on the Witwatersrand in the Bezuidenhout Valley. JG van Boeschoten, J. Lorentz and R.F. Bertram would purchase the land. It was laid out from 1892 but was later resurveyed in 1902.

It was previously a predominantly working class Jewish suburb and became associated with prominent Jewish South Africans such as Sol Kerzner and William Kentridge. It was home to the Lorentzville Shul, formally known as the Bertrams Hebrew Congregation, which now operates as an art studio. It later became a hub for the Portuguese South African community, before becoming multi-ethnic.
