= David Webster House =

Heritage building in South Africa

Coordinates: 26°12′1″S 28°4′24″E

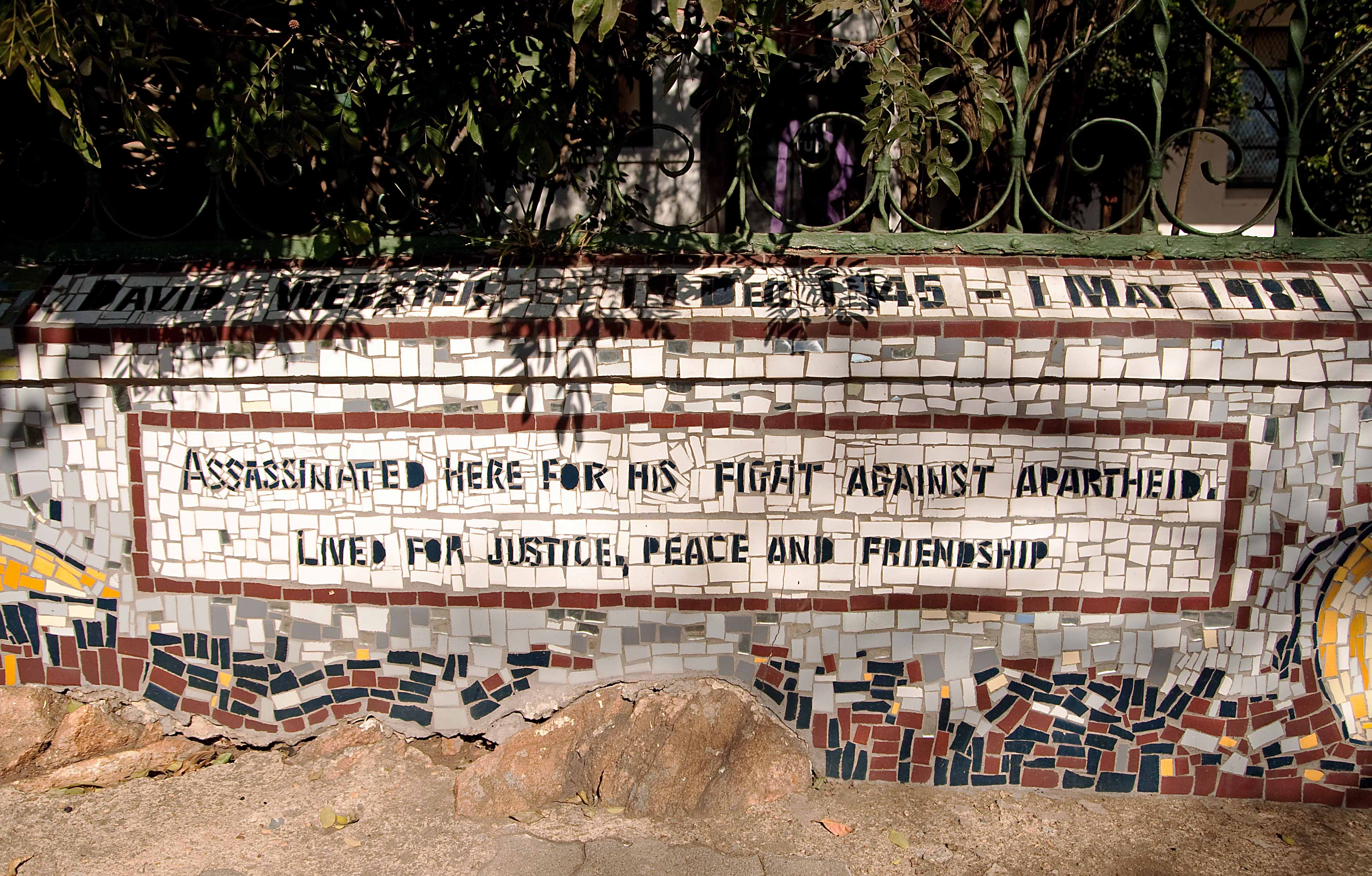
- his memorial; message in the artwork
- Interactive map of the David Webster House area

General information
- Location: 13 Eleanor Street, Troyeville, Johannesburg, South Africa

The David Webster House is at 13 Eleanor Street in Troyeville and it is important not only because this is where the anti-apartheid activist David Webster lived but it is also where he was killed by a government assassin. The house is still in private ownership but it is decorated to commemorate his life.

== History ==
David Webster was a Zambian who came to South Africa to study and to become an anthropologist. Whilst he was in South Africa his friend Neil Aggett was killed whilst in police custody. Webster formed the Detainees Parent Support Committee. He also joined the United Democratic Front and other anti-apartheid organisations. This activism was compounded when he witnessed the authorities covertly smuggling weapons into the country from Mozambique. He set up house at 13 Eleanor Street where he lived with his partner Maggie Friedman.

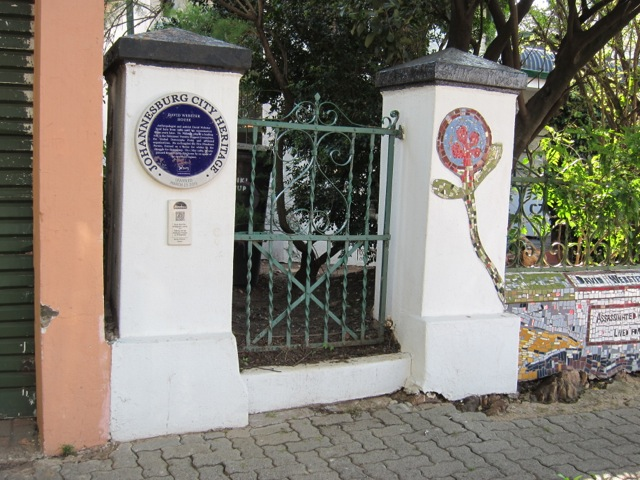
Plaques on the house

When Webster returned from shopping on 1 May 1989 he was killed by Ferdi Barnard with a shotgun under a contract from the government sponsored covert Civil Co-operation Bureau. Barnard was caught in 1998 and sentenced to life sentences and 63 years.

With the permission of the current owners the house has been decorated with designs made from tiles under the artistic guidance of Ilse Pahl, but the work has been done by a community of his friends. The design includes an outline of his daughter's hand, outstretched hands of friendship, local cattle and a football stadium. The message reads:

"David Webster 19 Dec 1945 – 1 May 1989. Assassinated here for his fight against apartheid. Lived for justice, peace and friendship". In 2012 the house was granted heritage status.
