= Sherry Chen (politician) =

South African businesswoman and former member of parliament

Sherry Su-Huei Chen 陳阡蕙
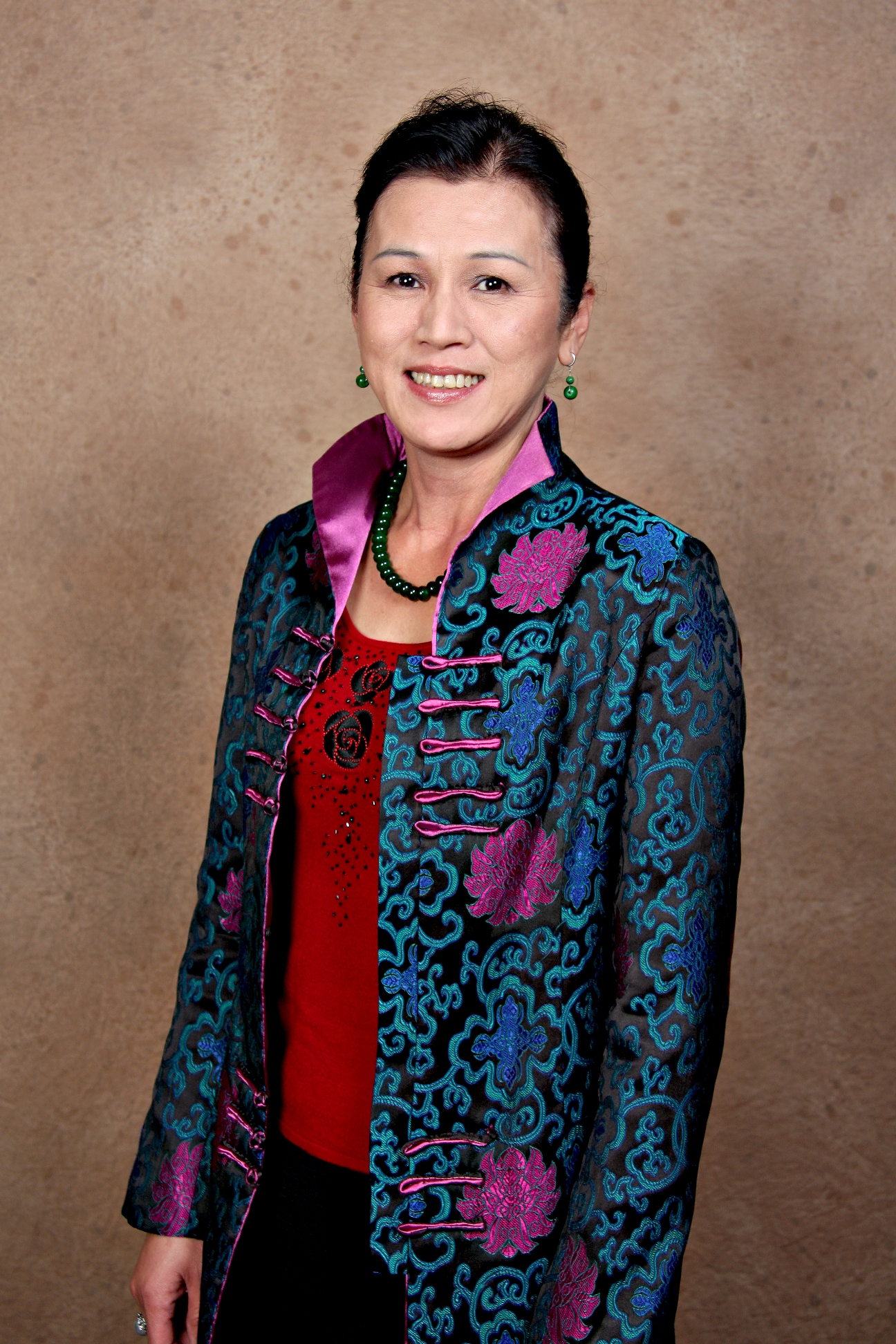

Delegate of the National Council of Provinces for Gauteng
- In office April 2004 – September 2010

Member of the Johannesburg City Council
- In office 2000–2004

Personal details
- Born: Chen Qianhui (Chinese: 陳阡蕙); 15 December 1955 (age 70) Taipei, Taiwan
- Party: Democratic Alliance
- Spouse: Vincent Lin
- Education: National Taiwan University (B.A. in Trade and Commerce)
- Profession: Businesswomen, Politician

Sherry Chen (Chinese: 陳阡蕙; pinyin: Chén Qiānhuì; born 15 December 1955) is a South African businesswoman and former member of parliament. Chen immigrated to South Africa in 1981, first working at a textile factory, then as an English secretary for a Taiwanese firm that later went bankrupt. She then did odd jobs for a while before getting a job at a travel agency.

Chen eventually went on to found four highly successful companies involved in a myriad of different commercial activities. Chen became involved in politics in 1994 through her activities with the Chinese community in South Africa. Due to business commitments, she did not run for office until she successfully ran for a seat on the Johannesburg city council, taking her seat in 2000. In 2004, she was elected as a member of parliament. In September 2010, Chen resigned from her position in parliament to focus more on her business interests and social welfare work.

== Awards ==
- Randburg Business Person of the Year (1994)
- Gauteng Business Person of the Year (1994)
- Top 19 Global Chinese Businesswoman (2011)
