= Five Freedoms Forum =

The Five Freedoms Forum (FFF) was a group of anti-apartheid organisations made up of mostly white people in South Africa. Established in 1987, the group disbanded around 1993.

== History ==
The Five Freedoms Forum was founded in 1986 in response to a call from Black South Africans to White citizens following the declaration of a state of emergency by the apartheid government. Composed mostly of white people, FFF was officially launched in Johannesburg on 18 March 1987. The name of the group was based on five freedoms: "freedom from want, freedom from fear, freedom from discrimination, freedom of speech and association and freedom of conscience."

Several organisations fell under the umbrella of the Five Freedoms Forum, including NUSAS, Black Sash, Young Christian Students, Jodac, the Catholic Church Commission for Justice and Peace, Concerned Social Workers, Jews for Social Justice, and the Detainees' Parents' Support Committee.

The Five Freedoms Forum organised a two-day conference of 800 delegates in September 1987, which was the first "nationwide meeting of South African white groups opposed to apartheid". In 1989, anti-apartheid campaigner, David Webster, who was involved with the Five Freedoms Forum, was assassinated.

The organisation disbanded in 1993.
