= Observatory, Johannesburg =

Observatory
- Location within Gauteng Location within South Africa
- Coordinates: 26.176°S 28.082°E
- Country: South Africa
- Province: Gauteng
- Municipality: City of Johannesburg
- Main Place: Johannesburg

Area
  - Total: 0.66 km^{2} (0.25 sq mi)

Population (2011)
  - Total: 490
  - Density: 740/km^{2} (1,900/sq mi)

Racial makeup (2011)
  - Black African: 32.9%
  - Coloured: 1.8%
  - Indian/Asian: 4.3%
  - White: 60.6%
  - Other: 0.4%

First languages (2011)
  - English: 71.0%
  - Zulu: 6.9%
  - Afrikaans: 3.9%
  - Tswana: 3.1%
  - Other: 15.1%
- Time zone: UTC+2 (SAST)
- Postal code (street): 2198
- PO box: 2187

Observatory is a suburb in Johannesburg's east and is located in Region E of the City of Johannesburg Metropolitan Municipality; it borders the suburbs of Houghton Estate, Cyrildene, Linksfield, Bellevue, Bellevue East and Dewetshof.

== History ==
It is named for the Union Observatory established in early 1903, sited on Observatory Ridge, the city's highest point. The suburb is situated on part of an old Witwatersrand farm called Doornfontein. It was established in 1903.

It is a well-established suburb: Observatory Girls' Primary was founded in 1918, and Observatory Golf Course founded in 1912 is the oldest golf club in Johannesburg still operating from its original ground.

It has traditionally been a centre for Johannesburg's Jewish community. Jewish residents made up 48.9% of the population in 1971. The suburb housed the Yeshivah Gedolah of Johannesburg, until its relocation to Glenhazel.

During the apartheid era, it was classed as a "whites only" area under the terms of the Group Areas Act. In 1991, the Abolition of Racially Based Land Measures Act, 1991 repealed the Group Areas Act.
