= David Webster (anthropologist) =

South African anthropologist

David Joseph Webster
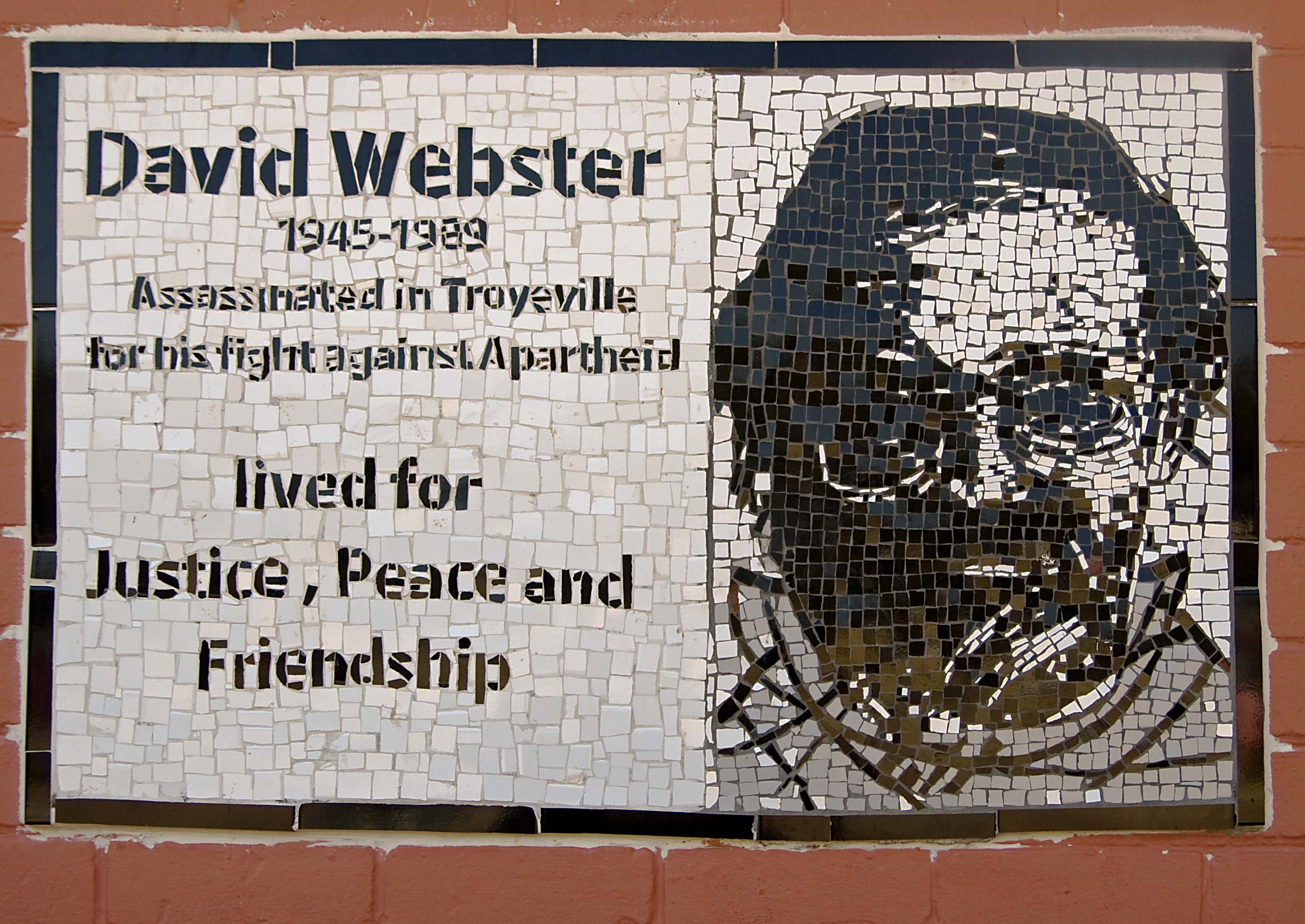
- Mosaic, David Webster Park
- Born: David Joseph Webster; 1 December 1944; Northern Rhodesia
- Died: 1 May 1989 (aged 44); Troyeville, Johannesburg, South Africa
- Cause of death: Murder (assassination)
- Resting place: West Park cemetery, Johannesburg
- Education: University of the Witwatersrand
- Scientific career
- Fields: Social anthropologist
- Workplaces: Rhodes University; University of the Witwatersrand
- Notable students: Johnny Clegg; Bruce Fordyce

David Webster (1 December 1944 – 1 May 1989) was a South African academic and anti-apartheid activist. He worked as an anthropologist at the University of the Witwatersrand, where he was a senior lecturer at the time of his assassination.

Webster was a founding member of the Detainees' Parents' Support Committee (DPSC) in 1981, a founder member of the Five Freedoms Forum, and a committed comrade in the United Democratic Front. Webster was also an active member of the Orlando Pirates supporters' club and he assisted in the mobilisation and organisation of South African musicians during the Struggle in the 1980s.

He was a long-term ethnographic researcher and his work near Kosi Bay on the Mozambican border resulted in a number of peer-reviewed academic publications.

Webster was assassinated by apartheid security forces outside his home on 1 May 1989.

== Early years ==
David Joseph Webster was born in 1944 in Northern Rhodesia, where his father worked as a miner in the Copperbelt. He was educated at Falcon College, Southern Rhodesia before the family returned to South Africa. He studied at Rhodes University in Grahamstown, where he was involved in student politics.

In 1970, Webster started teaching anthropology at the University of the Witwatersrand (Wits). His doctorate had been written on a traditional topic of anthropology (kinship), but it was focused on a politically explosive field, namely migrant workers from Mozambique. In 1976, he taught for two years with Peter Worsley at the University of Manchester.

Webster was active in the political anti-apartheid movement, especially in the 1980s for the Detainees' Parents' Support Committee, an organisation advocating the release of political detainees held without trial in South Africa.

His colleague Eddie Webster, was a sociologist in the Southern Centre for Inequality Studies, Wits.

== Assassination ==
Webster was shot dead outside his house at 13 Eleanor Street in Troyeville, Johannesburg, by assassins in the employ of the Civil Cooperation Bureau, a clandestine agency of the apartheid state. Thousands of people attended Webster's funeral service at St Mary's Cathedral, Johannesburg.

The hit squad was paid R40,000 (at the time, equivalent to about US$8,000) for his murder. Ferdi Barnard, the man who pulled the trigger on the shotgun used, was later tried and found guilty in 1998; he was sentenced to two life terms plus 63 years for a number of crimes, including the murder of Webster. Barnard was released from prison on 2 April 2019, after his parole was approved by Justice and Correctional Services Minister Michael Masutha in March 2019. Although Barnard was released, his life sentence was not commuted. Therefore, he will serve the remainder of his sentence in the community, and be monitored by the Community Corrections Office.

== Personal life ==
Dr Webster was an active member of the Orlando Pirates supporters' club. Members of the supporters' club formed a guard of honour around his coffin at his funeral.

== Legacy ==
The house in Troyeville where Webster lived with his partner Maggie Friedman has been declared a heritage site. On the site of his assassination outside David Webster House there is a mosaic that includes the words "Assassinated here for his fight against apartheid. Lived for justice, peace and friendship". A nearby park in Clarence Street (previously called Bloemenhof Park) was renamed the David Webster Park on the 20th anniversary of his death. There is also a mosaic in the park by Jacob Ramaboya from the Spaza Gallery which commemorates his life.

In 1992, the University of the Witwatersrand named a new Hall of Residence Webster's honour. The David Webster Hall of Residence is now home to about 400 Wits University students.

== Published works ==
- Webster, D; Hammond-Took, W D, eds. (1975), Agnates and affines: studies in African marriage, manners and land allocation, Johannesburg: Witwatersrand University Press.
- Webster, D 1984. The reproduction of labour power and the struggle for survival in Soweto. (Carnegie Conference paper no.20) Rondebosch: Southern Africa Labour and Development Research Unit. ISBN 0-7992-0694-6.
- Webster, D.; Friedman, M. (1989). Repression and the State of Emergency, June 1987-March 1989. Braamfontein: Ravan Press – via Southern African Research Service. (Published posthumously)
- Webster, David (1991). "Abafazi Bathonga Bafihlakala". African Studies. 50 (1). Taylor and Francis: 243–271. doi:10.1080/00020189108707744. ISSN 0002-0184. (Published posthumously)
