= Chris Wang (politician) =

South African politician

Yi-Ju Christopher Wang, commonly known as Chris Wang (Chinese: 王翊儒; pinyin: Wáng Yìrú; born May 15, 1977) is an African National Congress member of the National Assembly of South Africa. He was the youngest MP of the country when he was elected in 2004.

He is of one of three Members of Parliament that is of Chinese descent, the others being Eugenia Chang of the Inkatha Freedom Party, and Shiaan-Bin Huang of the ANC.

== Early life ==
Wang was born and raised in Taiwan. He immigrated to South Africa at the age of 14.
