= Observatory Ridge, Johannesburg =

Highest point in Johannesburg, South Africa

Observatory Ridge
- Ridgeline
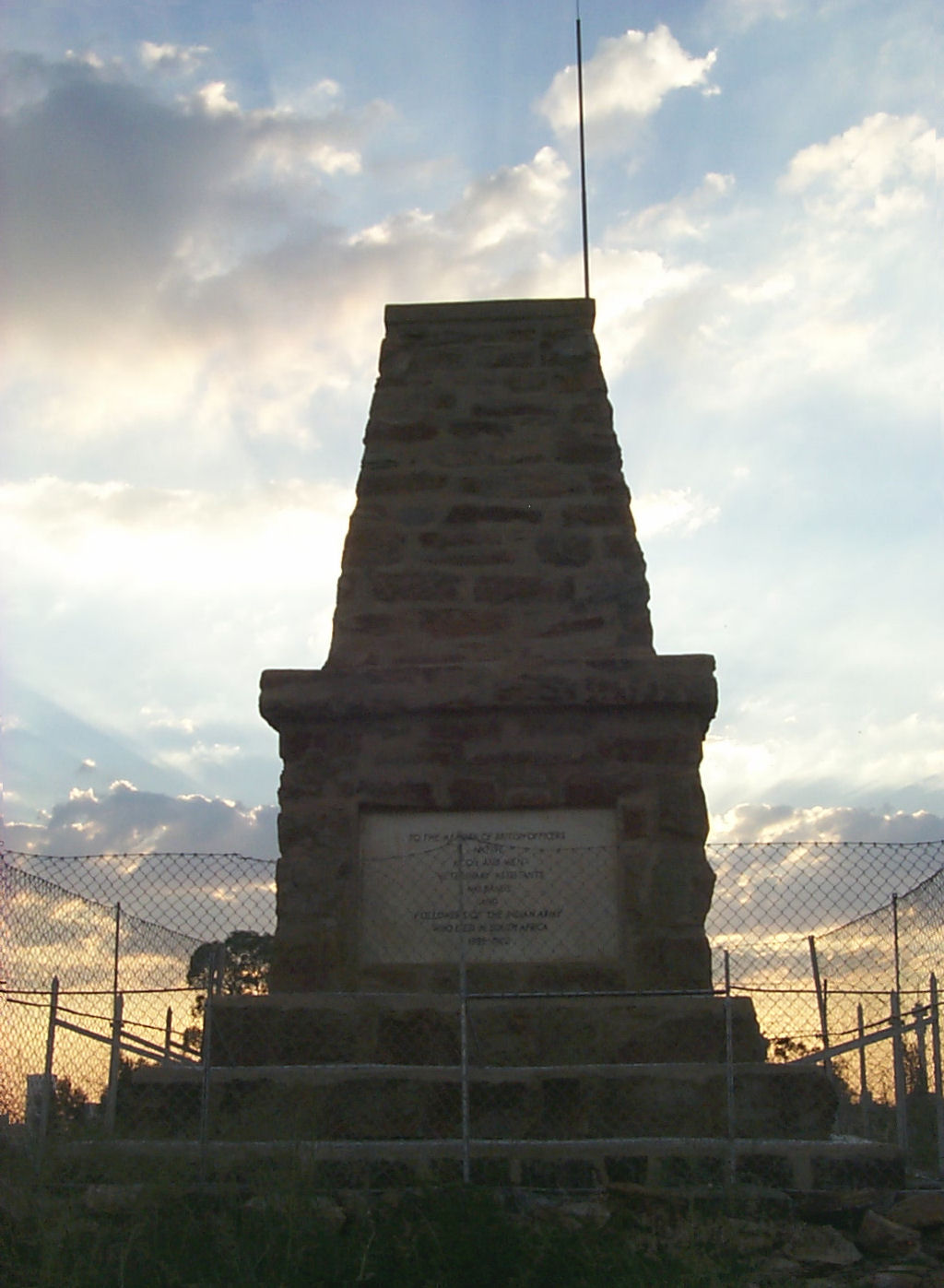
- Monument commemorating Indian Army
- Interactive map of Observatory Ridge
- Coordinates: 26°11′5″S 28°4′40″E
- Location: Observatory, Johannesburg, South Africa
- Elevation: 1,808 metres (5,932 ft)

Observatory Ridge is the highest point in Johannesburg, South Africa. It is 1,808 metres (5,932 ft) above sea level. It is in the suburb of Observatory.

There is a large sandstone monument on top of the ridge that commemorates the British Indian Army. The monument bears the inscription: "To the memory of British Officers, Natives, NCOs and Men, Veterinary Assistants, Nalbands, and Followers of the Indian Army".
