= Colin Coleman =

South African banker and public figure

- Born: 1962 (age 63–64)
- Occupations: Banker, academic
- Years active: 1980s-present
- Parent(s): Audrey and Max Coleman

Colin Coleman (born 1962) is a South African banker and public figure. He was previously a partner and the CEO of Goldman Sachs for Sub Saharan Africa. Coleman is co-founder and co-chairman of South Africa's Youth Employment Service (YES), and a non-executive board member at TFG Limited. He is also a non-resident Senior Fellow of the Atlantic Council, an adjunct professor at Columbia Business School, and has been interviewed by the BBC, CNN, France24, Bloomberg News, and CNBC Africa as an expert on markets, politics, and banking in South Africa.

== Biography ==
Coleman was born on October 31, 1962. In 1988, he graduated from the University of Witwatersrand in Johannesburg, South Africa with a BA in architecture. He became involved in South Africa's constitutional transition in the 1980s; Business Insider writes that Coleman "spent years helping to dismantle Apartheid." In 1987, he became the national media officer of the National Union of South African Students and, starting in 1989, held management positions with the Consultative Business Movement, Standard Bank Investment Corporation (SBIC), and Johannesburg's Standard Corporate & Merchant Banking. In the 1994 elections, he facilitated the International Mediation Forum, also brokering the agreement that “led to all parties participating” in the elections that year. He received the Business Statesman Award from Harvard Business School in 1994, then, in 1996, was named one of the World Economic Forum’s Global Leaders for Tomorrow.

He moved to London in 1997, where, until 2000, he was at JP Morgan as vice president of energy, power and oil for its Investment Banking Advisory Department. After JPMorgan, he began working with Goldman Sachs; in 2000 Goldman Sachs International appointed him as its head in South Africa, then named him a managing director in 2002, head of its Investment Banking Division for Sub-Saharan Africa in 2008, then a partner in 2010. That year Business Insider named him one of the 11 Most Impressive New Partners At Goldman Sachs, and he was one of Euromoney’s World Top Ten “Financing leaders for the 21st Century." He retired from the firm at the end of 2019.

Coleman is co-chair of YES, South Africa's Youth Employment Service, a public and private enterprise partnership targeting creation of one million South African business paid youth internships, which he co-founded in 2018. He has ascribed to the CEO Pledge of South Africa.

Before lecturing at Columbia Business School, he was he was a Distinguished Fellow at INSEAD, and a Senior Fellow and lecturer at Yale University's Jackson Institute for Global Affairs. While at Yale, in 2020, he was also a senior advisor to Eurasia Group political risk consultancy, and a non-executive board member at the Foschini Group (now TFG Limited).

He joined the advisory board of DC-based Mercury Public Aﬀairs in 2024, has been a board member of the Business Leadership South Africa (BLSA); the National Business Initiative; READ Development; Endeavor; and the Business Election Fund (BEF); and Kyosk; as well as a member of the advisory board of Arise IIP.
