= Mustek =

Mustek may refer to:

- Můstek (Prague Metro), a Prague Metro station
- Mustek Corp., a South African computer peripherals company founded by David Kan
