= Baptist Church, Troyeville =

Church building in South Africa

Coordinates: 26.20108°S 28.06721°E

Baptist church of Troyeville is the oldest Baptist church in South Africa dating from 1897. The church is still active in Troyeville and it classifies itself as a multicultural evangelical church aiming at reaching out to the local community.

== History ==
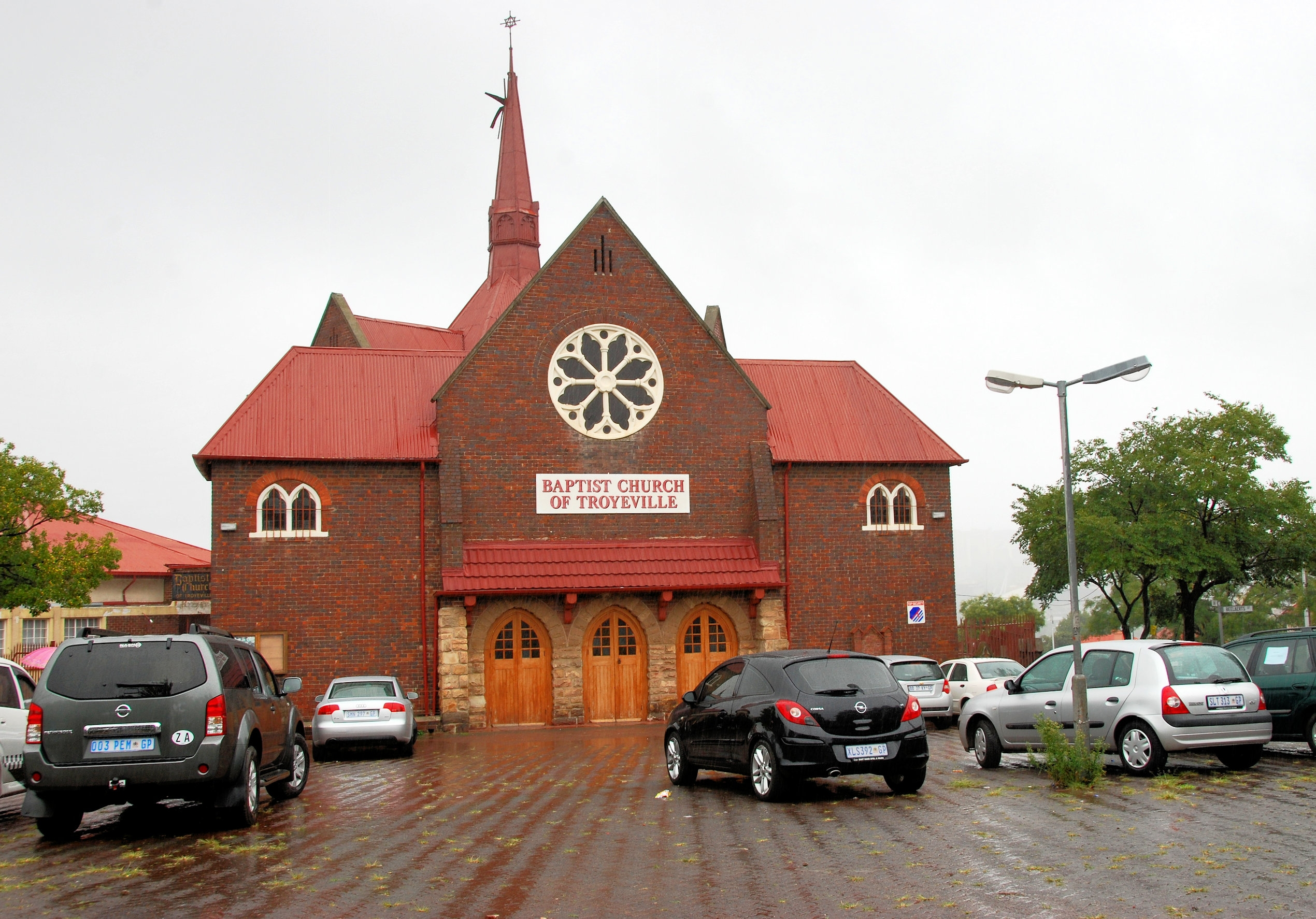
Troyeville Baptist Church

The church was first built in a small wood and iron building and was fondly known as "The Tin Tabernacle". The present church building was begun in 1909 designed by architect Alan Monsborough, the spire was then added by MacDonald Sinclair in 1911 and is topped by a combination of a cross and the Star of David.
