= Fairview, Gauteng =

Fairview
- Location within Gauteng Location within South Africa
- Coordinates: 26°12′10″S 28°04′02″E
- Country: South Africa
- Province: Gauteng
- Municipality: City of Johannesburg
- Main Place: Johannesburg
- Established: 1895

Area
  - Total: 0.21 km^{2} (0.081 sq mi)

Population (2011)
  - Total: 1,716
  - Density: 8,200/km^{2} (21,000/sq mi)

Racial makeup (2011)
  - Black African: 93.6%
  - Coloured: 2.3%
  - Indian/Asian: 1.3%
  - White: 2.6%
  - Other: 0.2%

First languages (2011)
  - Zulu: 41.8%
  - English: 10.7%
  - Tsonga: 7.2%
  - Southern Ndebele: 5.5%
  - Other: 34.8%
- Time zone: UTC+2 (SAST)
- Postal code (street): 2094
- PO box: n/a
- Area code: 011

Fairview is a suburb of Johannesburg, South Africa. It is a small suburb found on the eastern edge of the Johannesburg central business district (CBD), with the suburb of Troyeville to the north, Jeppestown to the south and Malvern to its east. Commissioner Street, the main street in the CBD, has its eastern end in the suburb. It is located in Region F of the City of Johannesburg Metropolitan Municipality.

== History ==
The suburb is situated on part of an old Witwatersrand farm called Doornfontein. This small suburb has it origin in the year of 1895 or early 1896 and was known either as Fairview or Fawcus Township. The land was owned by a man called George E. Fawcus who was married to a coloured woman and sometime after 1903, had made enough money off the land and so retired to Trinidad and Jamaica. He would sell the suburb to J.G. van Boeschoten and J. Lorenz. In the Johannesburg newspaper, The Star, stands were being advertised for sale during November 1896 for an average price of £300 but some were priced as high as £450. On the return of Fawcus' wife from the Caribbean in 1912 after her husband's death, she attempted to have the suburb renamed to Fawcus Township but was not successful.

== Heritage ==
There are several heritage sites in the suburb. In Commissioner Street, Fairview is the modern fire station in front of which stands the original fire station tower whose foundation stone was laid in 1906 by Julius Jeppe. Another heritage site is a Dutch Reformed Church in Op de Bergen Street and further down the same street, examples of early miners residences.
