= Bellevue East =

- Location within Gauteng Location within South Africa
- Coordinates: 26°11′01″S 28°04′11″E
- Country: South Africa
- Province: Gauteng
- Municipality: City of Johannesburg
- Main Place: Johannesburg

Area
  - Total: 0.35 km^{2} (0.14 sq mi)

Population (2011)
  - Total: 8,532
  - Density: 24,000/km^{2} (63,000/sq mi)

Racial makeup (2011)
  - Black African: 94.3%
  - Coloured: 2.2%
  - Indian/Asian: 0.4%
  - White: 2.0%
  - Other: 1.0%

First languages (2011)
  - Zulu: 29.5%
  - English: 25.8%
  - Southern Ndebele: 14.4%
  - Xhosa: 4.4%
  - Other: 26.0%
- Time zone: UTC+2 (SAST)
- Postal code (street): 2198

Bellevue East is a suburb of Johannesburg, South Africa. It is located in Region F of the City of Johannesburg Metropolitan Municipality.
