= Troyeville =

- Location within Gauteng Location within South Africa
- Coordinates: 26.199°S 28.066°E
- Country: South Africa
- Province: Gauteng
- Municipality: City of Johannesburg
- Main Place: Johannesburg
- Established: 1891

Area
  - Total: 0.61 km^{2} (0.24 sq mi)

Population (2011)
  - Total: 4,154
  - Density: 6,800/km^{2} (18,000/sq mi)

Racial makeup (2011)
  - Black African: 89.1%
  - Coloured: 4.1%
  - Indian/Asian: 2.2%
  - White: 3.2%
  - Other: 1.3%

First languages (2011)
  - Zulu: 28.7%
  - English: 13.5%
  - Xhosa: 7.1%
  - Sotho: 5.3%
  - Other: 45.4%
- Time zone: UTC+2 (SAST)
- Postal code (street): 2094
- PO box: 2139

Troyeville is a suburb of Johannesburg, South Africa. It is a small suburb found on the eastern edge of the Johannesburg CBD, with the suburbs of New Doornfontein, Bertrams and Lorentzville to the north, Fairview to the south and Kensington to its east. The main road through the suburb is Albertina Sisulu Road, which connects the CBD to Johannesburg's eastern suburbs and towns of the East Rand. It is located in Region F of the City of Johannesburg Metropolitan Municipality.

== History ==
Troyeville was founded as the gold rush happened and people tried to build homes and churches away from the centre of mining. The suburb was founded on one of the original farms on the Witwatersrand, after a strip of land was sold from the farm Doornfontein. The land was purchased by Hollanders, Van Boeschoten and Lorentz. Their land was surveyed by Gustav Arthur Troye and is named after this surveyor. The survey did not take into count the contours of the land and hence there are steep slopes in the suburb. The street names all have Netherlands origins. During 1895, the plots of land were being sold for an average price of £30. Mohandas Gandhi lived in Troyeville from a period between 1904 and 1906, with the house still in existence at 11 Albermarle Street.

The oldest Baptist church in South Africa is in Troyeville dating from 1897 when it was started by missionaries. An anti-apartheid activist David Webster lived on Eleanor Street at what is now called the David Webster House. The front of the house is decorated to celebrate his life and his murder for his beliefs.

== Education ==
Laërskool Johan Rissik was an Afrikaans language primary school. It included a junior school for kindergarten and first grade and a senior school for students from grades 2 to 5. The junior school was on what was then Kitchener Street (now Albertina Sisulu Road) and the senior school adjoining that street and Pretoria Street. The school was named after the first administrator of the Transvaal, Johann Rissik. It closed on 3 December 1991.

== Gallery ==
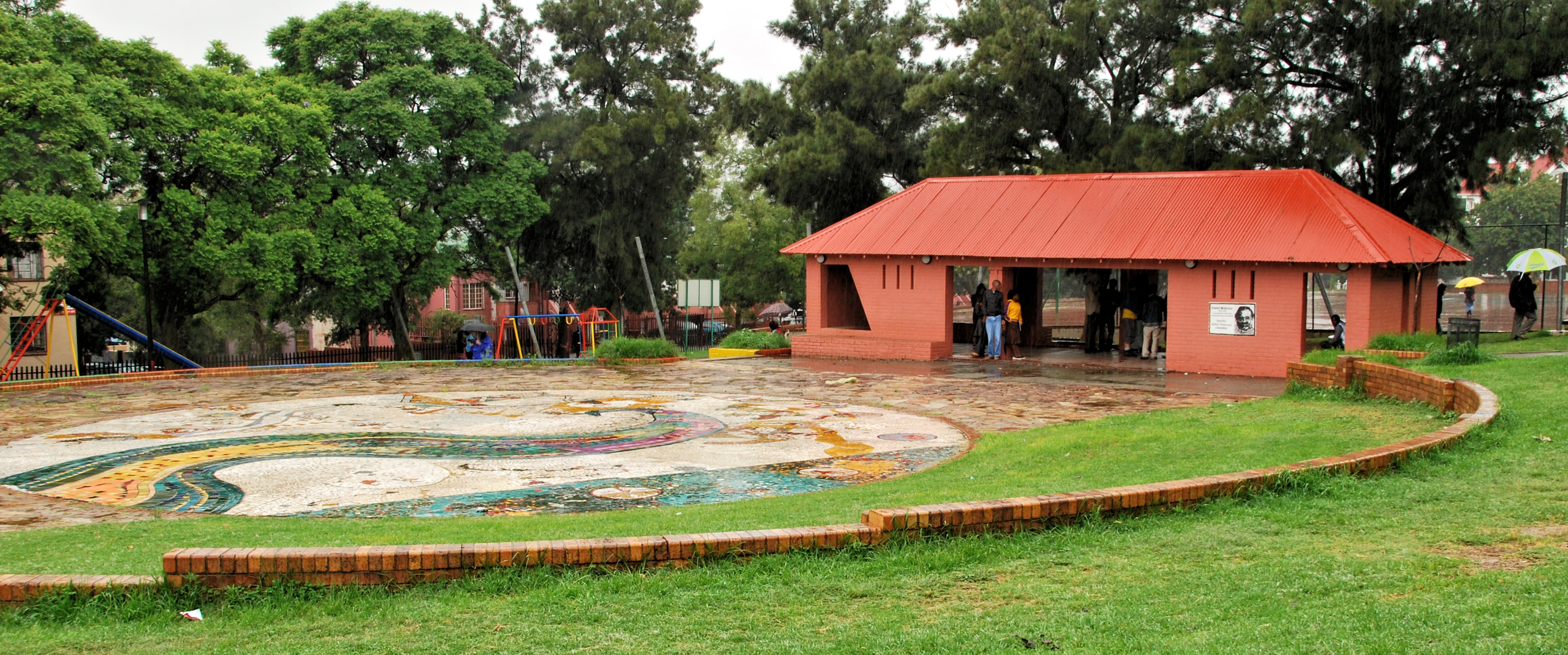
David Webster Park.

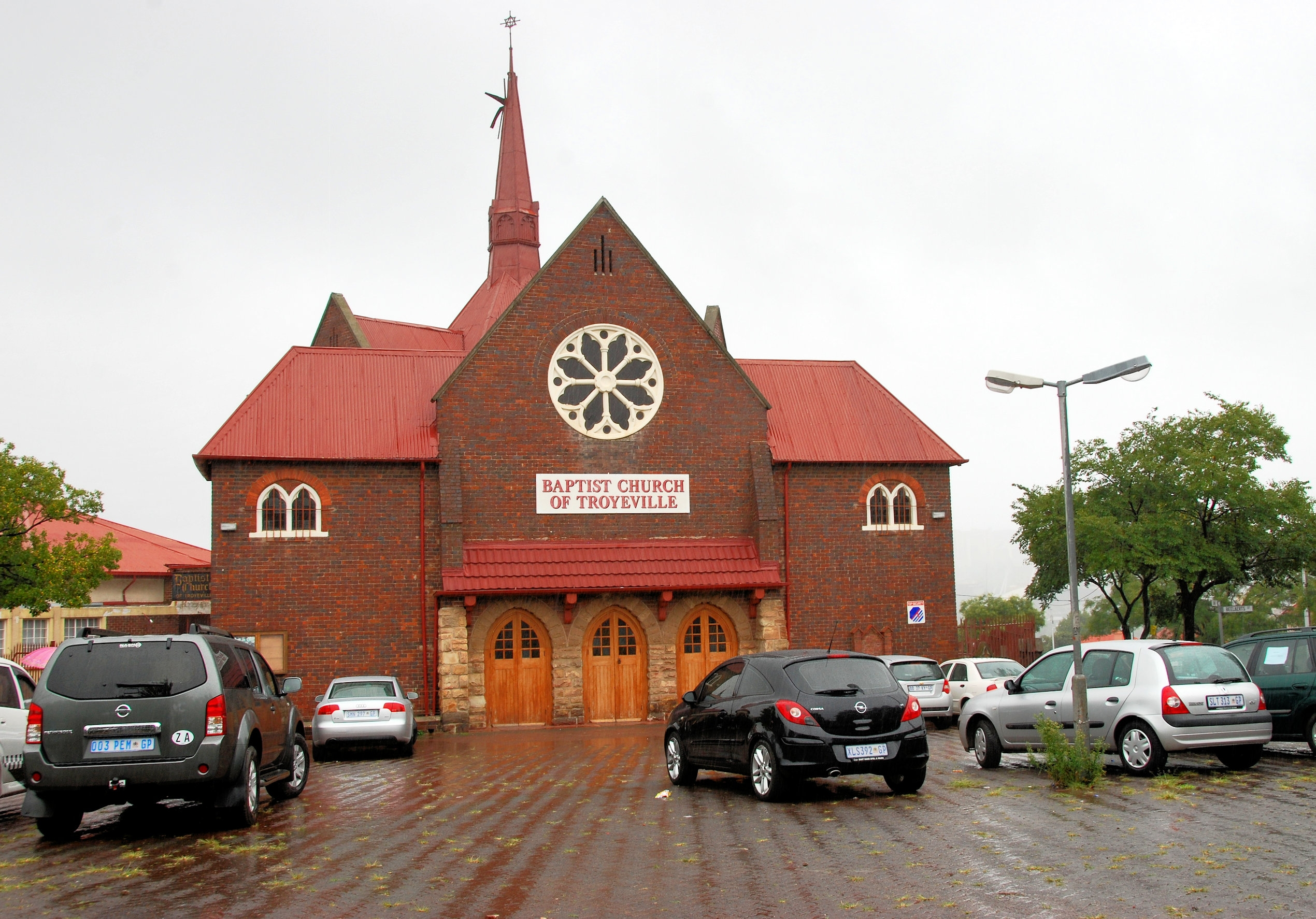
Troyeville Baptist Church

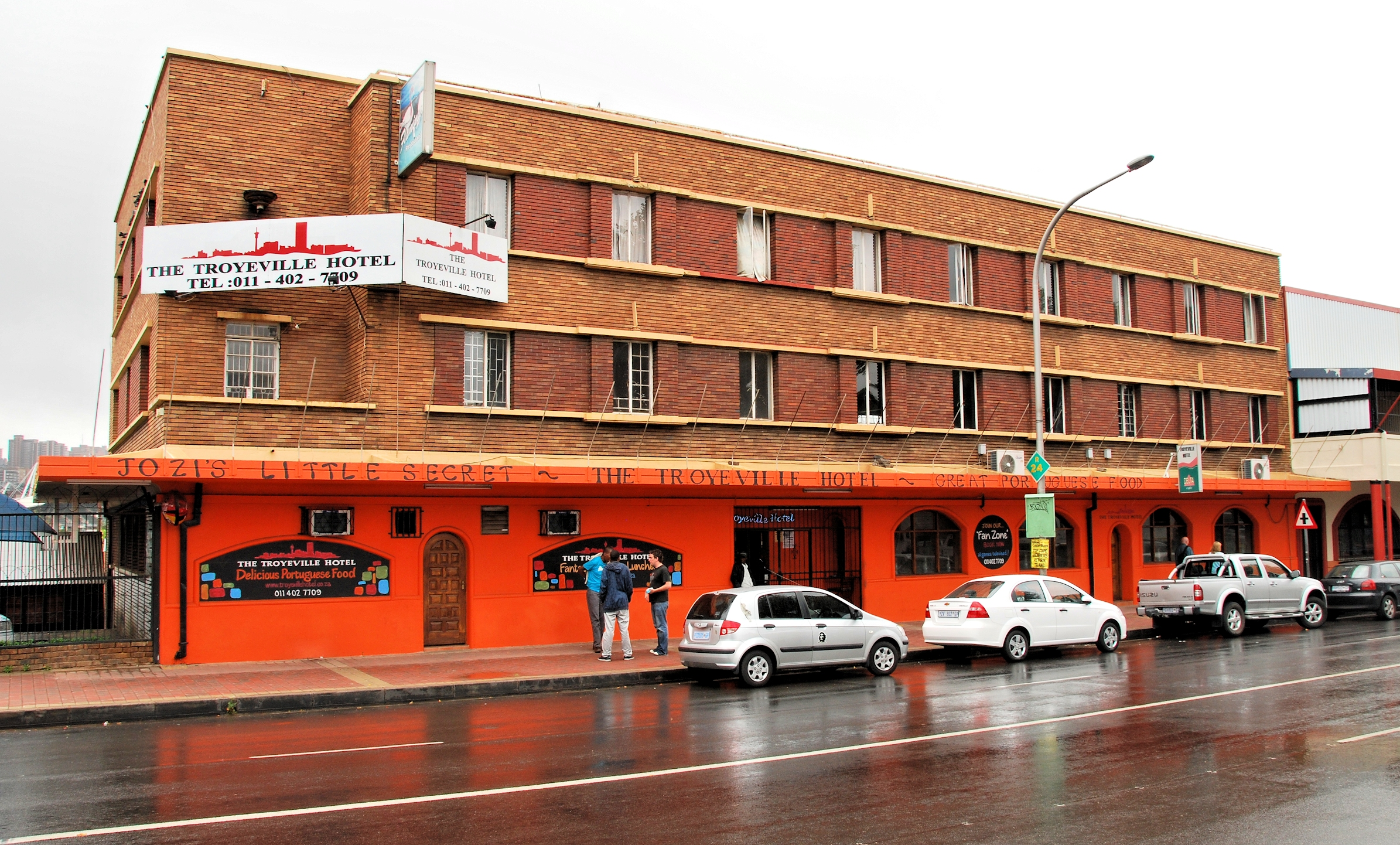
Troyeville Hotel.
