= Jennifer Su =

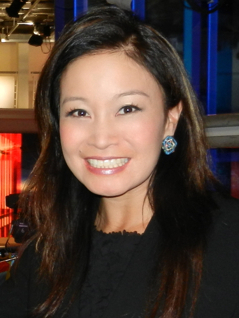
- Jennifer Su in 2011
- Born: 12 August 1968 (age 58); Jenkintown, Pennsylvania
- Education: University of Pennsylvania
- Occupations: Radio presenter; television host; singer
- Spouse: Del Bruce Levin
- Musical career
- Also known as: Jen Su, Jennifer Hai-ying Tsou
- Origin: Tsou

Jennifer Su (born 12 August 1968 as Tsou Hai-ying 鄒海音) is an American South African radio and television personality and singer of Chinese origin. She is best known as a news anchor for The Africa Business Report on Sky News. She is also a former presenter of The Hollywood Report on Gareth Cliff's show on 5FM. During the period of 2006–2008, Su was a prime time anchor for Star News Asia in Hong Kong.

As a teenager, Jen Su won an Idol-style contest in Taiwan, and later went on to release four albums.

== Publications ==
- 2015 – From Z to A-Lister: Building Your Personal Brand
