= Bertrams, Gauteng =

Bertrams
- Location within Gauteng Location within South Africa
- Coordinates: 26°11′34″S 28°3′58″E
- Country: South Africa
- Province: Gauteng
- Municipality: City of Johannesburg
- Main Place: Johannesburg
- Established: 1889

Area
  - Total: 0.39 km^{2} (0.15 sq mi)

Population (2011)
  - Total: 3,906
  - Density: 10,000/km^{2} (26,000/sq mi)

Racial makeup (2011)
  - Black African: 77.1%
  - Coloured: 7.6%
  - Indian/Asian: 3.4%
  - White: 10.7%
  - Other: 1.3%

First languages (2011)
  - Zulu: 21.3%
  - English: 16.9%
  - Afrikaans: 11.4%
  - Southern Ndebele: 7.5%
  - Other: 42.9%
- Time zone: UTC+2 (SAST)
- Postal code (street): 2094

Bertrams is a suburb of Johannesburg, South Africa. It is a small suburb found on the eastern edge of the Johannesburg central business district (CBD), tucked between the suburbs of New Doornfontein and Lorentzville, with Troyeville to the south. It is located in Region F of the City of Johannesburg Metropolitan Municipality.

== History ==
The suburb was founded on one of the original farms on the Witwatersrand, after a strip of land was sold from the farm Doornfontein. The suburb was named after its real estate developer Robertson Fuller Bertrams. It was proclaimed a suburb on 16 August 1889 and was initially called Bertramstown. By the 1930s, Bertrams accommodated a 'racially mixed working class population'. However, in the 1930s, black residents of Bertrams were some of the black people to be relocated to Orlando. Indian and coloured people were also relocated in order establish a white working class housing scheme. Bertrams began to desegregate two decades before the 1991 repeal of apartheid's racial segregation policies.
