= Eugenia Shi-Chia Chang =

Taiwanese-South African businesswoman and politician

Eugenia Shi-Chia Chang (Chinese: 張世嘉; pinyin: Zhāng Shìjiā) is a Taiwanese-South African businesswoman and former Member of Parliament of the Inkatha Freedom Party. She was involved in legal trouble in Taiwan in 2008, and which led to her removal from the Inkatha Freedom Party list in March 2009.

In the late 1980s and early 1990s, she was the president of China Garments Manufacturing (now CGM Group), which opened the first Taiwan-owned plant in the South African homeland of Ciskei. CGM Group was, by about 2003, based in South Africa and operates several large apparel production plants in Lesotho and in Dimbaza, with Chang as senior executive. In 2005, she declared to the Parliament remunerated employment outside Parliament at these employers, all in the manufacturing sector: United Clothing (Pty) Ltd, CGM Industrial (Pty) Ltd, and Presitex Enterprises (Pty) Ltd.

== Political career ==
Chang served as a Member of Parliament for South Africa’s Inkatha Freedom Party (IFP) from 2004 to 2009. From 2004 to 2005, she was the party’s spokesperson on trade and industry and during which she voiced disagreement with the South African government’s Black Economic Empowerment (BEE) policy. In 2009, she was removed from the IFP’s list of potential legislators following revelations of her legal troubles in Taiwan.

She also declared a residential property of 200m² in Bisho.

== See also ==
- South Africa–Taiwan relations
