= Asiatic Registration Act =

Apartheid law of 1906 in South Africa

The Asiatic Registration Act of 1906, of the Transvaal Colony, was an extension of the pass laws specifically aimed at Asians (Indians and Chinese). Under the act every male Asian had to register himself and produce on demand a thumb-printed certificate of identity. Unregistered people and prohibited immigrants could be deported without a right of appeal or fined on the spot if they failed to comply with the Act. The Act was repealed by the British government shortly after enactment (after some lobbying by a delegation led by Mahatma Gandhi), but it was re-enacted again in 1908.

Under the act, every Asian man, woman or child of eight years or upwards, entitled to reside in the Transvaal, was required to register their names with the Registrar of Asiatics and take out a certificate of registration. The applicants for registration had to surrender their old permits to the registrar, and state in their applications their name, residence, caste, age, etc. The registrar was to note down important marks of identification upon the applicant's person and take his finger and thumb impressions.

Parents were required to apply on behalf of their minor children and bring them to the registrar in order to give their finger impressions, etc. In case of parents failing to discharge this responsibility laid upon them, the minor on attaining the age of sixteen years was required to discharge it himself, and if he defaulted, he made himself liable to the same punishments as could be awarded to his parents.

== Background ==
After the First Boer War (1880-1881), the London Convention of 1884, determined how the South African Republic would be governed. Unlike the Orange River Colony, which would not admit Indians, in the Transvaal, Paul Kruger had no choice and Asiatic immigration was allowed.

In 1885, the South African Republic (ZAR) passed Act 3 of 1885, amended in 1886, that placed restrictions on Asiatics in the Transvaal. This Act restricted them to certain locations, and even certain streets in towns and villages. Indians had no rights that burghers had in the republic and could only own property in the locations allocated to them and had to pay a 3 pounds fee if they were engaged in a trade.

After the Second Boer War (1899-1902), Britain resumed control of the now Transvaal Colony. The old ZAR Act 3 of 1885 remained as law until the Transvaal Legislative Council, an appointed body, decided not to abolish the act but to amend it and this was known as the Asiatic Law Amendment Ordinance or Ordinance 29/1906. The ordinance became law on 28 September 1906 when it was published in the Transvaal Government Gazette.

The new ordinance went further than the old ZAR Law 3. Any Asiatic over sixteen years of age, entering or residing in the colony, could be demanded by a police officer or person authorised by the Colonial Secretary, to produce a certificate of registration. This certificate would contain, as means of identification, the fingerprints of the holder and effectively became a pass, with penalties if it were not carried at all times.

Prior to the law passing on 28 September, a meeting was attended by about 3,000 Indians in the Transvaal, and several motions were passed, and a delegation was to be established and a petition sent London calling for the law to be vetoed as laws passed by the Legislative Council needed assent by the British government. This mass meeting was held at 2pm on 11 September 1906 in the Empire Theatre in Johannesburg after all Indian businesses closed from 10am that morning.

Abdul Gani was the president of the meeting and was attended by the Colonial Secretary representative, Mr. Chamney. Five resolutions were passed at the meeting. The first resolution proposed by Nanalai Valji and it urged that the Legislative Council not pass the Asiatic Ordinance and presented the community's reasoning. The second resolution, proposed by Abdul Rahman, explained the reasons why the ordinance should be withdrawn by the local and British government. Resolution three, by Essop Mian, proposed to send a delegation to London to explain the community's grievances to the British government. Hajee Ojer Ally proposed the fourth resolution, and called for the attendees to go to jail rather than submit to the new ordinance if it was passed. Mahatma Gandhi spoke in favour of this resolution saying that it was time for action. The fifth resolution was proposed by Bhikubhai D. Malia, calling for the first resolution be sent to Legislative Council and the other resolutions be sent to the High Commissioner to the British government. The meeting ended at 5.30pm with God Save The King.

The delegates sent from the British Indian Association of the Transvaal were Mahatma Gandhi and Hajee Ojer Ally, a Muslim merchant of Johannesburg and founder of the Hamida Islamic Society, and they met the Secretary of State for the Colonies in London on 8 November 1906. They were accompanied to the meeting with Lord Elgin by a deputation headed by Sir Lepel Griffin, Lord Stanely of Alderley, Sir George Birdwood, Sir Henry Cotton, J. D. Rees, Harold Cox, Sir Mancherjee Bhownaggree, Ameer Ali, Dadabhai Naoroji and Dr. J. H. Thornton.

Gandhi and Ally stated in their petition, that they did not seek political power nor did they want unrestricted immigration of Indians into the Transvaal. But what they did want, was the freedom to own land, freedom to move around, freedom of trade subject to municipal requirements. For those reasons they wanted the ordinance vetoed by the British government, and a royal commission formed to investigate the Indian grievances. A core part of their petition was what it meant to be a British Indian and what being a member of the British Empire was really meant to mean. They also reiterated their non-violent opposition to the legislation.

Elgin acknowledge in his discuss with the deputation that he had also received telegrams from municipalities in the Transvaal in favour of the new law as well as telegrams from Transvaal Indians not in favour of the two delegates representing their interests. He also acknowledged the strong anti-Indian sentiment in the Transvaal by all cross-sections of the white population. Nor could Elgin promise a royal commission, as he was not in a position to make that decision. He acknowledged that he had received an interpretation of how the new law would be enforced in the colony that was contrary to the interpretation of the delegation. Mention was made that in 1907, the Transvaal Colony would obtain responsible government and would be free to make its own laws.

Following the meeting with Lord Elgin, on 22 November 1906, the two delegates and their supporters met with the Secretary of State for India John Morley to discuss their petition with him after their discussions with Lord Elgin.

On 29 November 1906, Lord Elgin informed the governor of the Transvaal that the British government would not assent to the new ordinance. He stated in his reply to the governor that the new ordinance did not meet the requirements of reform that had been asked of the old ZAR government by the British government prior to 1899 nor was there any changes made as required by his predecessor. He acknowledged in his reply that the law were indeed based on the views of the population of Transvaal and that the colonial government had believed it sought to improve the position of the Indians. He mentioned two ordinances in his reply that had been proposed to him prior to ending up with a single ordinance that he claimed was different in its substance and form. He also stated in his reasoning, that the Indians would prefer the old law as the new one would leave them worse off. Earl of Selborne William Palmer, governor of the Transvaal Colony, in his reply, objected to the vetoing of the ordinance and believed in his view, the law was in no way harassing or degrading to the Indians.

Gandhi and Ally would leave for South Africa on 1 December 1906.

When the Transvaal Colony obtained responsible government in 1907, the Asiatic Registration Act and the Immigration Act were passed by the colony's Legislative Assembly.

== Resistance to legislation ==
In response to the Transvaal Asiatic Registration Act, and to prevent the Asiatic community of South Africa suffering intolerable humiliation, Gandhi developed the concept of satyagraha.

In the book, Satyagraha in South Africa, Gandhi outlines how he developed the concept of satyagraha in South Africa. In the following section, he provides a summary of the nature and content of the Transvaal Asiatic Registration Act, which he later renamed the "Black Act." The extract also provides a useful description by Gandhi of why the "Black Act" was resisted — on the grounds of the safety of the Indian community, and to prevent the Asiatic community of South Africa suffering an intolerable humiliation.

== See also ==
- Category:Apartheid laws in South Africa
- Apartheid in South Africa
