= Max Coleman =

South African politician (1926–2022)

Max Coleman OLS

Member of the National Assembly
- In office 1994–1995

Personal details
- Born: 1926
- Died: 16 January 2022 (aged 95)
- Citizenship: South Africa
- Party: African National Congress
- Spouse: Audrey Coleman (m. 1953)
- Children: 4, including Colin
- Education: University of the Witwatersrand; Imperial College London

Max Coleman (1926 –16 January 2022) was a South African human rights activist and former businessman. He represented the African National Congress (ANC) in the National Assembly from 1994 to 1995 and then served in the South African Human Rights Commission from 1995 to 1996. During apartheid, Coleman was a founding member of the Detainees' Parents' Support Committee, a civil society organisation, after his son Keith was detained for his political activities. Coleman subsequently sold his business in order to organise on the committee's behalf full time.

== Early life and education ==
Max Coleman's father was an Orthodox Jew, born in Lithuania but raised in Ireland, and his mother was an Irish Catholic. Coleman was born in 1926, the year after they emigrated to South Africa.

He studied at the University of the Witwatersrand ("Wits"), where he was politically active, and spent time in London, where he completed a doctorate in chemical engineering at Imperial College.

== Business career ==
Upon his return to South Africa, Coleman co-founded a successful chemical and photographic business, Photra, which employed around 500 people at its height.

== Anti-apartheid activism ==
In the 1950s, Coleman and his wife were inactive members of the Congress of Democrats: they were morally opposed to apartheid, but Coleman had not been involved significantly in the anti-apartheid movement.

Coleman later said that he became politically conscious after the 1976 Soweto uprising, when his sons – then teenagers and young adults – became involved in student politics and "started educating their parents". His eldest son, Keith, was detained without trial for his activism in October 1981 alongside Neil Aggett and others who appeared on a list of anti-apartheid "comrades" written by Barbara Hogan and intercepted by the police's Security Branch. Keith was held at John Vorster Square in Johannesburg until April 1982, and during that time Coleman took up a daily vigil outside the police station, holding up a placard to protest political detentions.

Also during that period, Coleman, his wife, David Webster, and others founded a committee, initially meeting at Wits University, for the parents of the young activists who had been detained in the October 1981 raids. Inspired by the Argentinian Mothers of the Plaza de Mayo, they called the group the Detainees' Parents' Support Committee. The committee became a national organisation for legal and financial assistance, petitioning, and record-keeping in advocacy for detained anti-apartheid activists and their families, growing especially quickly during the 1985 state of emergency; it established headquarters in Khotso House in Johannesburg.

Coleman sold his business and, with his wife, became a full-time human rights activist. In 1985, he was involved in founding the Kagiso Trust with leaders of the South African Council of Churches. Initially relying largely on Coleman's patronage and that of the European Union, the trust helped fund the Detainees' Parents' Support Committee and various development initiatives. After the Detainees' Parents' Support Committee was banned, he headed its successor organisation, the Human Rights Committee, into the 1990s.

== Post-apartheid government: 1994–1996 ==
In South Africa's first post-apartheid elections in 1994, Coleman was elected to a seat in the National Assembly, the lower house of the new South African Parliament; he represented the governing party, the African National Congress (ANC). He left Parliament in 1995 when he was appointed as a commissioner to the South African Human Rights Commission. However, he resigned from the commission the following year, with effect from October 1996, citing "personal reasons"; the Mail & Guardian reported that he had clashed with the commission's chair, Barney Pityana.

== Recognition and honours ==
In November 2021, President Cyril Ramaphosa awarded Coleman the Order of Luthuli in silver "for his contribution to the fight for liberation and promotion of human rights through active involvement in lobbying utilising both civic organisations and government institutions". His wife received the honour at the same time and afterwards they released a joint statement that was highly critical of the ANC and government, writing:

The freedoms Nelson Mandela and the ANC so bravely fought for, the vision of egalitarian, non-racial democracy, is today but a flickering glimmer of the light that shone brightly on 27 April 1994. State capture and thuggery have corrupted not only the state, but the minds and soul of the ANC. They have attempted to steal the freedom, vision and hopes of the nation. They cannot be allowed to succeed. The ANC must rid itself of corrupt elements, the democratic state must be restored to its historic duty to put South Africans first.

The Colemans jointly received the Mahatma Gandhi Satyagraha Award from the Gandhi Development Trust in 2014.

== Personal life and death ==
In 1953, Coleman married Audrey Coleman (née Goldman), the sister of an old friend whose anti-apartheid activism – initially through women's organisation Black Sash – predated her husband's. They had four sons: Keith, Brian, Neil, and Colin. Colin Coleman is a banker and academic, and Neil Coleman was a longtime Congress of South African Trade Unions official before he co-founded the Institute for Economic Justice, a left-leaning think tank in Johannesburg.

Coleman died in his sleep on 16 January 2022, aged 95. President Ramaphosa made a video address at his memorial.

On 6 February 2022, the 40th anniversary of Neil Aggett's death in custody, there was a commemoration to honour Aggett at Westpark Cemetery, organised by the Kathrada Foundation. His de facto widow Liz Floyd addressed the group, and paid tribute to Coleman, George Bizos, and Frank Dutton, who fought for justice for Aggett and other detainees.
