= Bezuidenhout Valley =

- Location within Gauteng Location within South Africa
- Coordinates: 26°11′17″S 28°04′28″E
- Country: South Africa
- Province: Gauteng
- Municipality: City of Johannesburg
- Main Place: Johannesburg

Area
  - Total: 1.77 km^{2} (0.68 sq mi)

Population (2011)
  - Total: 9,252
  - Density: 5,230/km^{2} (13,500/sq mi)

Racial makeup (2011)
  - Black African: 64.07%
  - Coloured: 10.02%
  - Indian/Asian: 12.44%
  - White: 11.15%
  - Other: 2.31%

First languages (2011)
  - English: 45.59%
  - Zulu: 16.51%
  - Afrikaans: 5.85%
  - Ndebele: 3.58%
  - Other: 16.26%
- Time zone: UTC+2 (SAST)
- Postal code (street): 2094

Bezuidenhout Valley is a suburb of Johannesburg, South Africa. The area lies to the east of the Johannesburg CBD and is surrounded by the suburbs of Kensington to the south and Observatory to the north. It is located in Region E of the City of Johannesburg Metropolitan Municipality. It is colloquially known as “Bez Valley.”

== History ==
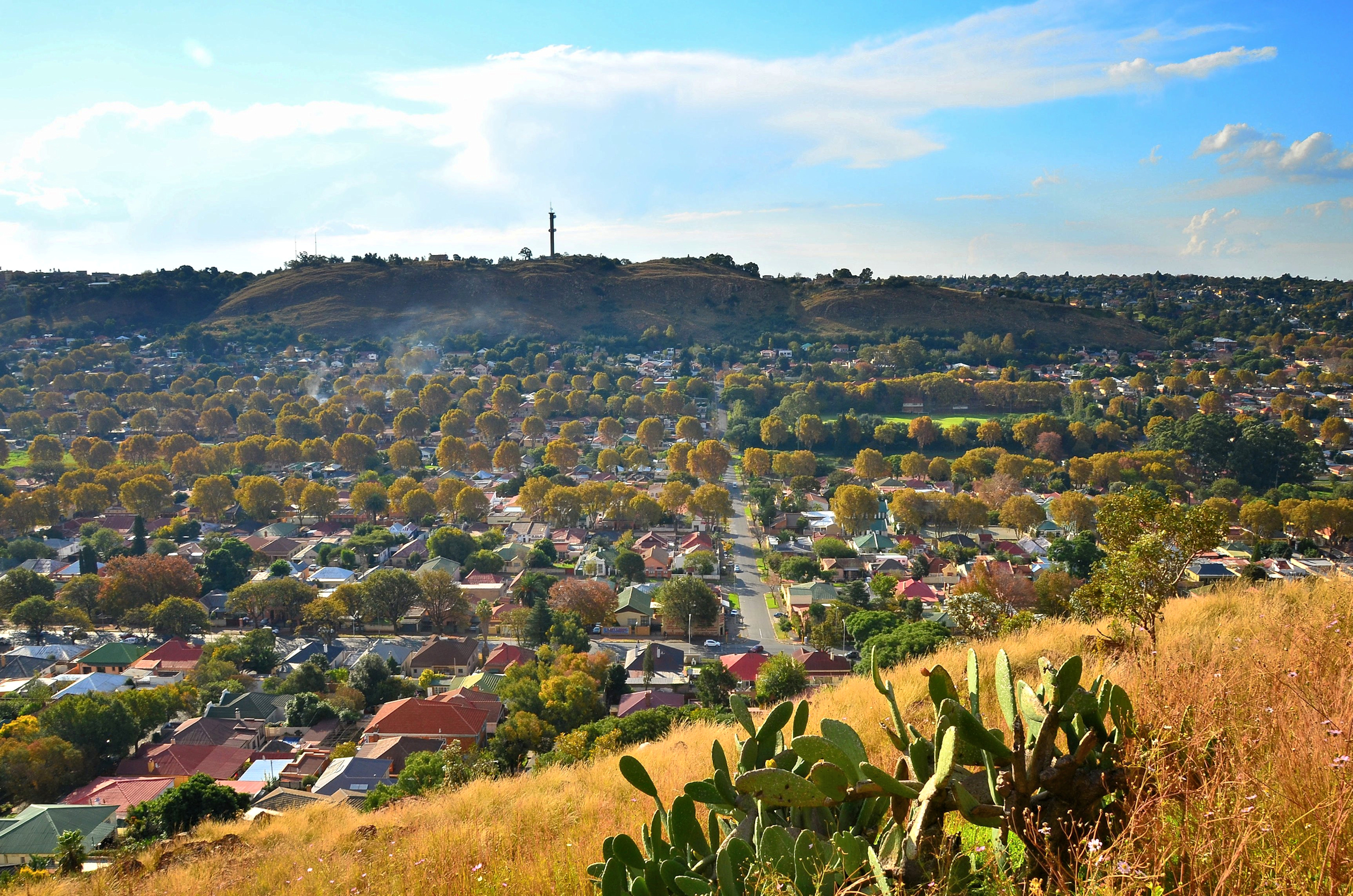
Bezuidenhout Valley

The suburb is situated on part of an old Witwatersrand farm called Doornfontein. The farm Doornfontein was purchased in 1861 from B.P. Viljoen by Frederik Jacobus Bezuidenhout. Parts of the farm were sold from 1902 and the suburb stands from 1906. In March 1949, Willem Bezuidenhout sold the remaining land of 133ha to the Johannesburg City Council for use as a park and to be called Bezuidenhout Park.
