= Kensington, Gauteng =

Kensington
- Location within Gauteng Location within South Africa
- Coordinates: 26°11′36″S 28°6′22″E
- Country: South Africa
- Province: Gauteng
- Municipality: City of Johannesburg
- Main Place: Johannesburg
- Established: 1897

Area
  - Total: 5.21 km^{2} (2.01 sq mi)

Population (2011)
  - Total: 19,197
  - Density: 3,680/km^{2} (9,540/sq mi)

Racial makeup (2011)
  - Black African: 45.9%
  - Coloured: 6.4%
  - Indian/Asian: 9.5%
  - White: 37.0%
  - Other: 1.3%

First languages (2011)
  - English: 59.6%
  - Zulu: 11.0%
  - Afrikaans: 6.7%
  - Xhosa: 2.5%
  - Other: 20.2%
- Time zone: UTC+2 (SAST)
- Postal code (street): 2094
- PO box: 2101

Kensington is a hilly suburb of Johannesburg, South Africa. It was established in 1897 by Max Langermann (after whom the thoroughfare Langermann Drive is named). It is located in Region F of the City of Johannesburg Metropolitan Municipality and is bounded to the west by the suburb of Troyeville, to the east by Bedfordview and the north by Bruma and Cyrildene.

== History ==
Roberts Avenue, Kensington, 2002.

Prior to the discovery of gold on the Witwatersrand in 1886, the suburb lay on land of one of the original farms called Doornfontein. Kensington is laid out over the slopes of several koppies (flat-topped, high-sided hills). The streets were laid out in 1903, with the suburb named by the owner of the land, Max Langermann. All of the streets coming off Langermann Drive are in alphabetical order and are named after British war ships.

The streets were heavily planted with trees, which give the area a distinctive, wooded appearance. Notable features of the suburb include Rhodes Park, named after Cecil Rhodes; Jeppe High School for Boys, Jeppe High School for Girls, Kensington Castle and the Kensington Cross, along with other streets e.g. Emerald Street named on the far end of Kensington.

=== The Kensington Cross ===
The Kensington Cross is a memorial on Caledonia Hill, made out of granite with the shape of an Iona Cross, a superimposed sword (a 16th Century two-handed true claymore or claidheamhmor), the memorial proudly bears the Scottish shield of lion rampant and royal treasure. The inscription reads "Nemo me impune lacessit 1900".

Also known as the Boer War Cross of Iona, the statue has an identical twin. On the esplanade at Edinburgh Castle and the other is on Caledonia Hill, Johannesburg. The later is cared for by the Transvaal Scottish Association.

== Demographics ==
=== Religion ===
Kensington is also home to the headquarters for the Church of Scientology of Johannesburg.

== Economy ==
=== Retail ===
There are several shopping centres and office parks in the area such as the Eastgate Shopping Centre, Park Meadows Shopping Centre and the Pick 'n Pay head offices. Kensington is a restaurant neighbourhood in development, with most restaurants and coffee shops amid the antique shops on Queen Street. There is an annual Spring Fest on the opening weekend of September.

== Education ==
There are several schools in the suburb. Kensington Ridge Primary School opened in August 1937. Jeppe High School for Boys, Jeppe High School for Girls and Jeppe Prep are all located on Roberts Avenue. Leicester Road Primary school opened in 1938.
