= David Kan =

South African Taiwanese businessman (1959–2022)

- Born: July 2, 1959; Taipei, Taiwan
- Died: May 19, 2022 (aged 62); South Africa
- Education: Pittsburg State University
- Occupation: Businessman
- Known for: Founder of Mustek
- Spouse: Su-Wen Annie Kan (1992-2004) Dionne Chen (2005-2022)
- Children: 3

David Chih-Hsing Kan (2 July 1959 – May 19, 2022) was a Taiwanese-born CEO and founder of Mustek, one of the largest assemblers and distributors of personal computers and complementary ICT products in South Africa. Mustek is the operational business division of the Mustek Limited Group, which also includes Rectron.

== Early life and education ==
Born in Tapei, Taiwan, on 2 July 1959, Kan did a series of odd jobs growing up, including working as a dishwasher at the age of 15. He was also a waiter, truck driver, and removal company worker.

On completion of the Taiwanese equivalent of matric at Ta-Hwa Junior College in Hsinchu in 1980, he left for the US to study mechanical engineering at Pittsburg State University in Kansas.

After graduating in 1986, he relocated to South Africa, where his father was working as an economic counsellor for the Republic of China. Kan was working in a cutlery manufacturing facility when in 1987 he attended the first personal computer (PC) exhibition hosted by the Taiwanese government in Johannesburg. It was here that Kan met the then managing director of the Taiwanese company Mustek Corporation, Owen Chen, who was interested in setting up a warehouse in South Africa. Kan made a partnership proposal with Chen and visited Mustek Corporation in Taiwan to receive training.

== Career ==
Kan set up Mustek in South Africa in 1987, importing and distributing components and assembling PCs for other brands, and then becoming manufacturer of the Mecer brand of computers. Considered a pioneer in the tech space in South Africa, he led the development of the country’s first PC assembly plant.

To get the business started, he borrowed $50,000 from both Chen and his father. That was the only capital investment the company would ever need.

Kan attributed the company’s early success “with being at the right place at the right time”, as the demand for PCs began to grow in the 1980s, and import tariffs gave Mustek a competitive advantage in establishing its dominance in the South African market.

In 1995, Rectron was established as part of the Mustek Group to focus on the distribution of PC components.

Mustek also comprises Mecer Inter-Ed, a controlling shareholding in Palladium, shareholdings in Sizwe Africa IT Group and Khauleza IT Solutions, and a substantial shareholding in Yangtze Optics Africa Cable. Mustek operates in South Africa, with anchor operations in Zimbabwe, Kenya and Nigeria.

The IT company listed on the Johannesburg Stock Exchange in 1997. This made it the first Taiwanese company to be listed on a South African stock exchange. In 2003, it did a dual listing on the Taiwan Stock Exchange through issuing Taiwan Depositary Receipts (TDRs). In 2005, the company was responsible for about 25% of the computers sold in South Africa, and its ME-CER computer brand ranked first in personal computer sales in the country.

Mustek reported an after-tax profit for the six months between 1 July and 31 December 2021 of R152 million, and an increase in revenue of 12.5% from R3.72 billion in 2021 to R4.19 billion in 2022. At the beginning of 2022, Kan had increased his shareholding in the firm to 25.42%.

Kan was a founding member of the Board of Directors of Zinox, a Nigerian tech brand launched in 2001.

He died on May 19, 2022, aged 62.
