= Bruma, Gauteng =

Bruma
- Location within Gauteng Location within South Africa
- Coordinates: 26.1751°S 28.1042°E
- Country: South Africa
- Province: Gauteng
- Municipality: City of Johannesburg
- Main Place: Johannesburg

Area
  - Total: 1.28 km^{2} (0.49 sq mi)

Population (2011)
  - Total: 2,260
  - Density: 1,770/km^{2} (4,570/sq mi)

Racial makeup (2011)
  - Black African: 32.6%
  - Coloured: 3.5%
  - Indian/Asian: 20.4%
  - White: 40.0%
  - Other: 3.5%

First languages (2011)
  - English: 68.5%
  - Afrikaans: 5.8%
  - Zulu: 2.7%
  - Xhosa: 1.5%
  - Other: 21.5%
- Time zone: UTC+2 (SAST)
- Postal code (street): 2198
- PO box: 2026

Bruma is a suburb of Johannesburg, South Africa. It is noted for a small lake (being treated to reduce water-borne pollution), and for its popular flea market which sold souvenirs from across Africa. The old flea market was closed due to the development of a Chinese mall. Around 50 art and craft traders operate from nearby Oppenheimer Street and continues to attract many visitors and tourists. The area surrounding Bruma Lake has been redeveloped in the last few years. It has a small mall known as Asia City. The mall mainly sells goods imported from Asia.

== Geography ==
=== Communities ===
The residential area is renowned for compact houses and townhouses~~.~~ The neighbouring suburbs include Cyrildene, where a small Chinatown exists, Bedfordview and Kensington.

=== Bruma Lake Flea Market, Gauteng ===
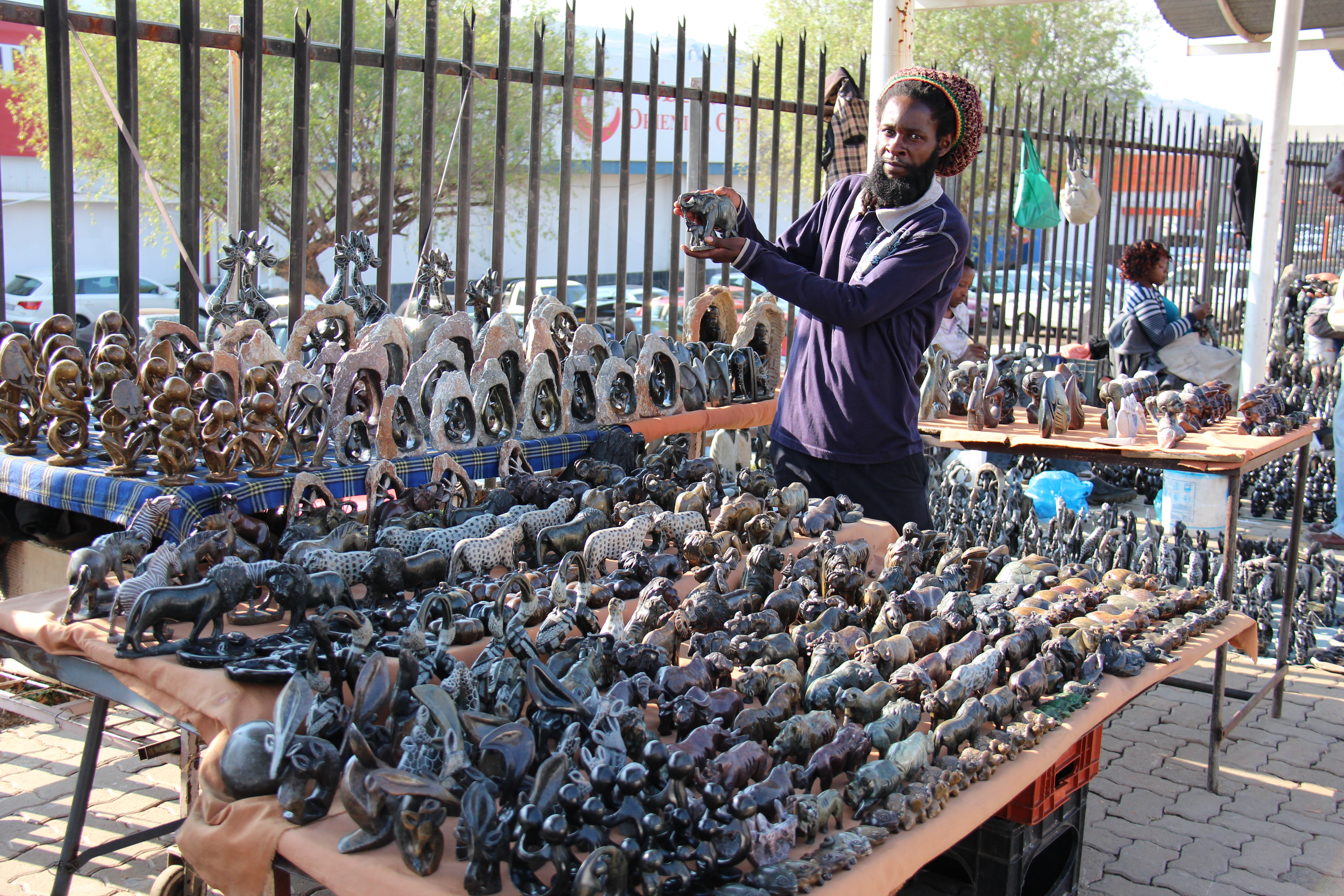
A trader at the market

Bruma flea market offers a wide range of arts and crafts from South Africa and other African countries.

There are more than 50 art and craft traders presently operating along Oppenheimer Street, Bruma (opposite McDonald's).

Some of the arts and crafts sold at the market include handmade items such as bead work, wood crafts, wire art, stone sculptures, African clothing and leather souvenirs.

The old Bruma flea market was closed during 2012.

== Law and government ==
=== Government ===
The Railway Safety Regulator previously had its head office in Waterview Corner in Bruma.

== Infrastructure ==
=== Roads ===
The R24, N12 and N3 Eastern Bypass highways are accessible from Bruma, and the R24 highway leads directly to O.R International Airport, formerly called Johannesburg Airport.
