= Cyrildene =

Suburb in Johannesburg, South Africa

- Location within Gauteng Location within South Africa
- Coordinates: 26.173°S 28.101°E
- Country: South Africa
- Province: Gauteng
- Municipality: City of Johannesburg
- Main Place: Johannesburg
- Established: 1938

Area
  - Total: 1.20 km^{2} (0.46 sq mi)

Population (2011)
  - Total: 3,417
  - Density: 2,850/km^{2} (7,370/sq mi)

Racial makeup (2011)
  - Black African: 26.5%
  - Coloured: 3.0%
  - Indian/Asian: 33.9%
  - White: 31.1%
  - Other: 5.5%

First languages (2011)
  - English: 55.8%
  - Zulu: 3.7%
  - Afrikaans: 3.4%
  - Northern Sotho: 2.1%
  - Other: 35.0%
- Time zone: UTC+2 (SAST)
- Postal code (street): 2198

Cyrildene (simplified Chinese: 西罗町; traditional Chinese: 西羅町) is a suburb of Johannesburg, South Africa. The area is found east of the Johannesburg CBD and is surrounded by the suburbs of Linksfield, Observatory and Bruma.

In the early-mid twentieth century it drew in Jewish families from Central Johannesburg, by 1971, Jews made up 63% of the resident population. Most Jewish residents have since relocated to more affluent areas of Johannesburg or emigrated abroad.

During the apartheid era, it was classed as a "whites only" area under the terms of the Group Areas Act. Since the repeal of the Act in 1991, the resident-mix has become more cosmopolitan, with a large Chinese population.

It is noted for a new Chinatown that exists on Derrick Avenue. This new Chinatown is now considered as the main Chinatown in Johannesburg, replacing the declining Chinatown on Commissioner Street in the inner-city of Johannesburg. It is located in Region F of the City of Johannesburg Metropolitan Municipality.

== History ==
The suburb is situated on part of an old Witwatersrand farm called Doornfontein. It would be proclaimed as suburb on 18 May 1938 and was named after the land developer's son, Cyril Cooper.

=== Jewish community ===
In 1942, a Jewish congregation, Cyrildene - Observatory Extension Hebrew Congregation, was established, as the area was attracting a growing number of Jewish families from the central areas of the city. Prior to constructing a permanent home, services were held at private homes, a shop, Cyrildene Garage, with High Holiday services held at a marquee. Services and Talmud Torah classes were also held at the site of the present Athlone Girls High School in Observatory.

In 1950, the congregation build a communal hall and classrooms on Aida Avenue in Cyrildene. In 1965, the hall was converted into a permanent synagogue, and it was consecrated by Rabbi Bernard M. Casper. Several prominent members of the Jewish community have been involved with the congregation, including Solly Krok, furniture retailer, Eric Ellerine and Melbourne-based Rabbi Ralph Genende, Officer of the Order of Australia (AO).

Cyrildene was also home to a Jewish sporting club. A factor in the establishment of Jewish sporting clubs was antisemitism, with Jews barred from being admitted to several clubs in the city at the time.

In his seventeen-month period underground between 1961 and 1962, Nelson Mandela spent some of this time at a "safe house" in Cyrildene, the home of Jewish couple, Cyril and Raie Jones.

In 1971, Jews made up 63% of the resident population. During the 1990s, Jewish residents increasingly moved to more prosperous areas of Johannesburg or emigrated overseas.

=== Chinese community ===
In 1991, Cyrildene was subject to the Abolition of Racially Based Land Measures Act, 1991. This abolished the Group Areas Act, in place since the 1950s, and classes Cyrildene as a "whites only" area.

Unlike the old and now largely abandoned Chinatown in Newtown, which was largely made up of second or third generation South African Chinese, the new inhabitants of the Chinatown in Cyrildene are overwhelmingly first generation Chinese immigrants from mainland China. The Chinatown has a paifang (arch).

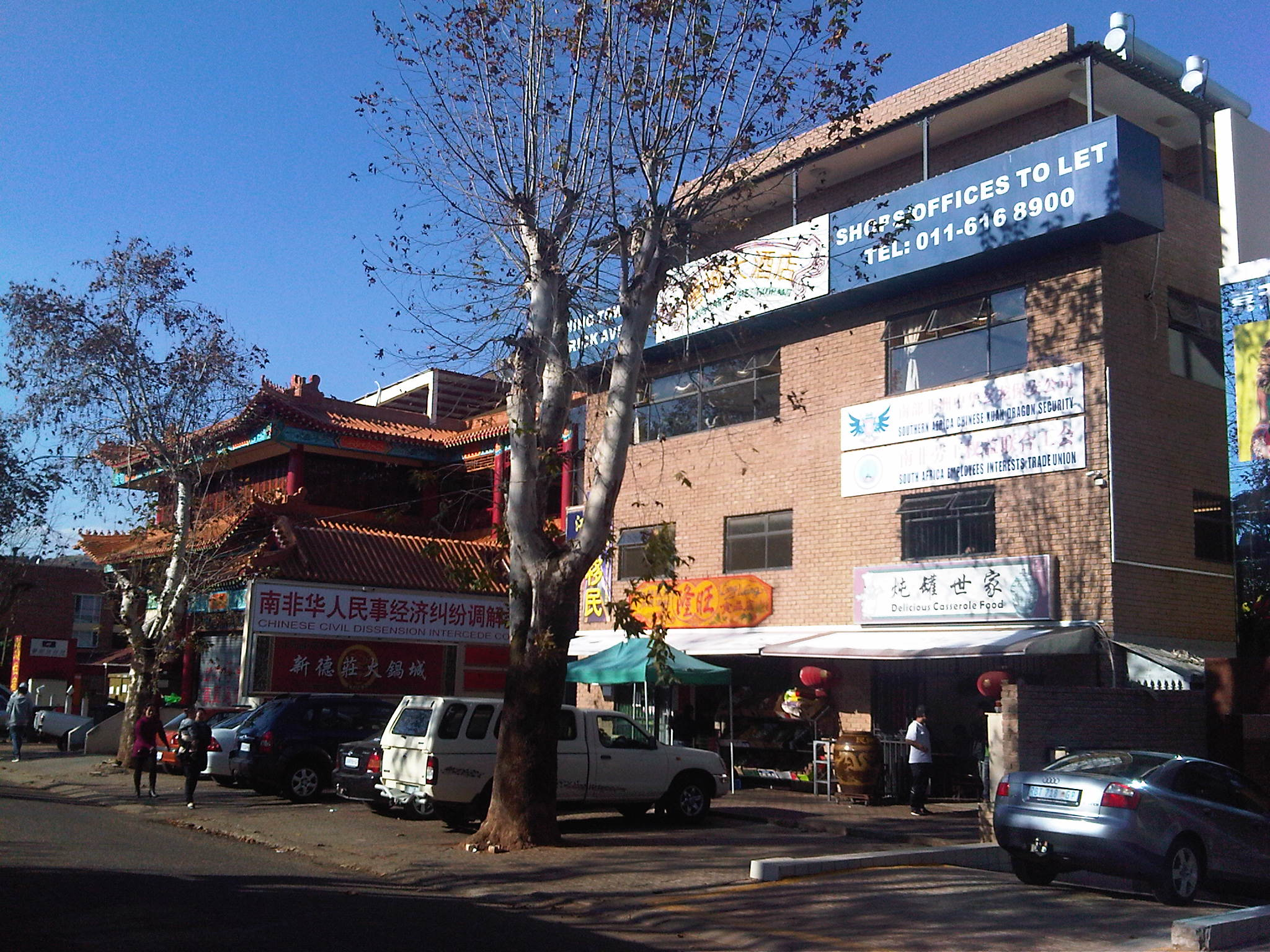
A street scene of the Chinatown on Derrick Avenue in Cyrildene, Johannesburg. (May 2011)

== Notable residents ==
- L Ron Hubbard, lived in Cyrildene in the 1960s for a few months. The house is now used as a museum. It is also used as a recruitment centre of the Church of Scientology. The house, at 40 Hannaben Street, was built in 1951 for the a Greek timber merchant called Manos Broulidakis and was designed by Frank Ludwig Jarrett.
