= List of museums in South Africa =

This list of museums in South Africa is a list of museums, defined for this context as institutions (including nonprofit organisations, government entities, and private businesses) that collect and care for objects of cultural, artistic, scientific, or historical interest and make their collections or related exhibits available for public viewing. Museums that exist only in cyberspace (i.e., virtual museums) are not included.

To use the sortable tables: click on the icons at the top of each column to sort that column in alphabetical order; click again for reverse alphabetical order.

== Museums ==
=== Eastern Cape ===
Name	Province	Location	Image	Type	Notes	Coordinates	SAHRIS Site Reference
Albany Museum	Eastern Cape	Grahamstown					
Amathole Museum	Eastern Cape	King William's Town					
Fort Beaufort Museum	Eastern Cape	Fort Beaufort					
National English Literary Museum	Eastern Cape	Grahamstown		Literature			9/2/003/0016
Observatory Museum	Eastern Cape	Grahamstown					9/2/003/0045
Red Location Museum	Eastern Cape	Port Elizabeth		Apartheid			
Schreiner House Museum	Eastern Cape	Cradock		Literature		32°10′24.53″S 25°37′04.32″E	
South African Air Force Museum	Eastern Cape	Port Elizabeth		Military Aviation		33°59′23″S 25°37′04″E	
The Owl House	Eastern Cape	Nieu-Bethesda					9/2/033/0007
East London Museum	Eastern Cape	East London					

=== Free State ===
Name	Province	Location	Image	Type	Notes	Coordinates
Anglo-Boer War Museum	Free State	Bloemfontein		Military		29°14′06″S 26°21′24″E
National Museum, Bloemfontein	Free State	Bloemfontein		Natural History, Cultural History, Art		29°06′54″S 26°13′08″E
South African Armour Museum	Free State	Bloemfontein		Military		
Parys Museum, Parys	Free State	Parys		Natural History, Cultural, Religious		

=== Gauteng ===
Name	Province	Location	Image	Type	Notes	Coordinates
African Window	Gauteng	Pretoria		Cultural History		
Zonderwater Italian military cemetery	Gauteng	Cullinan		Military History	Italian World War II cemetery and memorial located in the former Zonderwater POW camp.	
Hechter Schulz Museum and Study Centre	Gauteng	Boksburg		Ethnographic		
Apartheid Museum	Gauteng	Johannesburg		Apartheid		26°14′15″S 28°00′33″E
Eksteen Transport Museum	Gauteng	Pretoria		Transport		
Freedom Park	Gauteng	Pretoria		Cultural		25°46′00″S 28°11′22″E
Geological Survey Museum (South Africa)	Gauteng	Pretoria		Geological		
Hector Pieterson Museum	Gauteng	Johannesburg		Apartheid	The events leading up to the Soweto uprising	26°14′05″S 27°54′32″E
Fietas Museum	Gauteng	Johannesburg				
James Hall Transport Museum	Gauteng	Johannesburg		Transport Museum		26°14′03″S 28°03′12″E
Johannesburg Art Gallery	Gauteng	Johannesburg				
Johannesburg Holocaust & Genocide Centre	Gauteng	Johannesburg		Memory. Education. Lessons for Humanity.		
Kruger House	Gauteng	Pretoria		Historic house	The house used by President Paul Kruger of the South African Republic	25°44′47″S 28°10′53″E
Lindfield Victorian House Museum	Gauteng	Johannesburg		Living Victorian House Museum		26°11′06.71″S 28°00′29.47″E
Mapungubwe Museum	Gauteng	Pretoria		Archaeological		
Melrose House	Gauteng	Pretoria		Military, Residential	Preserved Georgian mansion in which the Treaty of Vereeniging was signed	
MuseuMAfricA	Gauteng	Newtown, Johannesburg				
National Cultural History Museum (South Africa)	Gauteng	Pretoria				25°45′12″S 28°11′04″E
Nelson Mandela National Museum	Gauteng	Johannesburg		Historic house		26°14′18″S 27°54′31″E
No Show Museum	Gauteng	Johannesburg		Art of nothing		
Peacemakers Museum	Gauteng	Johannesburg				
Pretoria Art Museum	Gauteng	Pretoria		Art		25.747°S 28.213°E
Fort Klapperkop Military Museum	Gauteng	Pretoria		Military		25°46′49″S 28°12′37″E; 25°46′37″S 28°11′05″E
SAB World of Beer	Gauteng	Johannesburg		Beer		
Sammy Marks House	Gauteng	Pretoria		Historic house	Preserved Victorian mansion belonging to Jewish entrepreneur Sammy Marks	
South African Air Force Museum	Gauteng	Pretoria		Military Aviation		25°48′12″S 28°09′44″E
South African Airways Museum Society	Gauteng	Rand Airport, Germiston		Civil Aviation		26°14′30″S 28°9′33″E
South African National Museum of Military History	Gauteng	Johannesburg		Military		26°09′49″S 28°02′29″E
South African National Railway And Steam Museum	Gauteng	Krugersdorp		Transport		
South African Police Service Museum	Gauteng	Pretoria		Law Enforcement		
Willem Prinsloo Agricultural Museum	Gauteng	Pretoria		Agriculture		
Transvaal Museum	Gauteng	Pretoria		Natural History		25°45′11″S 28°11′21″E
Van Tilburg Collection	Gauteng	Pretoria		Arts		
Van Wouw Museum	Gauteng	Pretoria		Sculpture		
Voortrekker Monument	Gauteng	Pretoria		Cultural	Monument to the early pioneers of the South African Interior	25°46′35″S 28°10′33″E

=== KwaZulu-Natal ===
Name	Province	Location	Image	Type	Notes	Coordinates
Fort Amiel Museum	KwaZulu-Natal	Newcastle				27°44′47″S 29°55′17″E
Himeville Museum	KwaZulu-Natal	Himeville				
Margate Art Museum	KwaZulu-Natal	Margate				
KwaZulu-Natal Museum	KwaZulu-Natal	Pietermaritzburg				
Voortrekker Museum	KwaZulu-Natal	Pietermaritzburg				
The Old Prison Museum	KwaZulu-Natal	Pietermaritzburg				

=== Limpopo ===
Name	Province	Location	Image	Type	Notes	Coordinates
Eersteling Monuments	Limpopo	Polokwane		Industrial	The site of the country's first gold crushing site and its first gold power plant are marked by monuments	
The Irish House	Limpopo	Polokwane		Residential	Historic building which functions as a museum.	
Bakone Malapa Northern Sotho Open-Air Museum	Limpopo	Polokwane		Cultural, "living"	Depicts the traditional and modern-day lifestyle of the Bakone people.	
Mapungubwe Hill	Limpopo	Musina		Archaeological	The ancient kingdom of Mapungubwe gave rise to Great Zimbabwe	

=== Mpumalanga ===
Name	Province	Location	Image	Type	Notes	Coordinates
Samora Machel Monument	Mpumalanga	Mbuzini		Accident memorial	The site where Mozambican President Samora Machel lost his life in an aeroplane accident.	
Barberton Museum	Mpumalanga	Barberton		Local history, geology, archaeology, cultural	Museum focussing on the Barberton district and Swazi cultural group	
Krugerhof Museum	Mpumalanga	Waterval-Boven		Second Boer War	Museum housed in an old farm house used by the Transvaal Government in exile	
Pilgrim's Rest	Mpumalanga	Pilgrim's Rest		Cultural	The entire gold-rush town of Pilgrim's Rest has been preserved as a living museum	

=== North West ===
Name	Province	Location	Image	Type	Notes	Coordinates
Boekenhoutfontein	North West	Rustenburg		Historic residence	The former residence of Paul Kruger	

=== Northern Cape ===
Name	Province	Location	Image	Type	Notes	Coordinates
Duggan-Cronin Gallery	Northern Cape	Kimberley				
Fred Turner Folk and Culture Museum	Northern Cape	Loeriesfontein				30°57′08″S 19°26′49″E
Old Parsonage Museum	Northern Cape	Fraserburg				
McGregor Museum	Northern Cape	Kimberley				
Sol Plaatje Museum	Northern Cape	Kimberley				
Windmill Museum	Northern Cape	Loeriesfontein				30°57′06″S 19°26′49″E
Sonskip Living Museum (an earthship)	Northern Cape	Orania				29°49′00″S 24°24′41″E

=== Western Cape ===
Name	Province	Location	Image	Type	Notes	Coordinates
CAPE HERITAGE MUSEUM, CASTLE OF GOOD HOPE	Western Cape	Cape Town				
Bartolomeu Dias Museum Complex	Western Cape	Mossel Bay				
Bredasdorp Shipwreck Museum	Western Cape	Bredasdorp				
Cape Education Museum	Western Cape	Wynberg, Cape Town		Education		34.001414°S 18.466457°E
Cape Medical Museum	Western Cape	Cape Town				
District Six Museum	Western Cape	Cape Town				33.927723°S 18.4236726°E
Koopmans-de Wet House	Western Cape	Cape Town				33.920941°S 18.421291°E
Groot Constantia Manor House	Western Cape	Cape Town				
Ceres Transport Riders' Museum	Western Cape	Ceres				
CP Nel Museum	Western Cape	Oudtshoorn				
Franschhoek Motor Museum	Western Cape	Franschhoek				33.5253°S 18.5913°E
George Museum	Western Cape	George				
Heart of Cape Town Museum	Western Cape	Cape Town				33°56′28″S 18°27′47″E
Hout Bay Museum	Western Cape	Hout Bay				
Huguenot Monument Memorial Museum	Western Cape	Paarl				33°54′50″S 19°07′27″E
Iziko South African Museum	Western Cape	Cape Town		Museum		
Iziko South African National Gallery	Western Cape	Cape Town		Art		
Montagu Museum	Western Cape	Montagu				
Old Harbour Museum	Western Cape	Hermanus				
Outeniqua Transport Museum	Western Cape	George				
Robben Island Museum	Western Cape	Cape Town				33°48′01″S 18°22′19″E
South African Sendinggestig Museum	Western Cape	Cape Town		Historic house		
Slave Lodge	Western Cape	Cape Town		Museum		
Simon's Town Museum	Western Cape	Simon's Town		Museum		
South African Air Force Museum	Western Cape	Cape Town		Military Aviation		33°54′17″S 18°29′35″E
South African Naval Museum	Western Cape	Simonstown				34°11′35″S 18°25′59″E
Waterworks Museum	Western Cape	Cape Town				
The Warrior Toy Museum	Western Cape	Simonstown		Toy		
Stellenbosch Toy and Miniature Museum	Western Cape	Stellenbosch				
Stellenbosch Museum	Western Cape	Stellenbosch				33.9374°S 18.8629°E
Chavonnes Battery Museum	Western Cape	Cape Town				33°54′26″S 18°25′17″E
Drostdy Museum	Western Cape	Swellendam				
Zeitz Museum of Contemporary Art Africa	Western Cape	Cape Town				33°54′30″S 18°25′23″E

== See also ==
- List of natural history museums in South Africa
- List of museums
