= Red Square (disambiguation) =

Red Square is a city square in Moscow.

Red Square or Redsquare may also refer to:

== Places ==
- Red Square (Oriental Plaza), a former public square in Fordsburg, South Africa
- Red Square (University of Washington), an open square on campus, Seattle, Washington, U.S.
- Red Square (restaurant), a Soviet-themed restaurant/bar in Las Vegas, Nevada, and in Atlantic City, New Jersey, U.S.
- Red Square (Cheboksary), a city square, site of the Chuvash National Museum, in Cheboksary, Russia
- Red Square, the name of Alexander Nevsky Square between 1923 and 1952
- Red Square, the former nickname for a high-rise apartment building that featured a statue of Vladimir Lenin until 2016 in New York City, U.S.
- Red Square, a location on the campus of Georgetown University, Washington, D.C., U.S.
- Red Square, a location on the campus of Georgetown University in Qatar, Qatar
- Red Square, a location on the campus of The Evergreen State College, Olympia, Washington, U.S.
- Red Square, a location on the campus of Salisbury University, Salisbury, Maryland, U.S.
- Red Square, a location on the campus of Western Washington University, Bellingham, Washington, U.S.
- Red Square, a location on the campus of Pacific Lutheran University, Tacoma, Washington, U.S.

== Other uses ==
- Red Square (novel), a novel by Martin Cruz Smith
- Red Square (painting), a painting by Kazimir Malevich
- Red Square Nebula, a celestial object
- The solidarity symbol used during the 2005 and 2012 Quebec student protests
- Redsquare, the name of a South Korean girl group
