= Red Square (Fordsburg) =

The Red Square was an open plaza in Fordsburg, South Africa that was a popular site for mass political meetings in the 1940s and 1950s. The site is now covered by the South Mall and Car Park 4 of the Oriental Plaza. Completed in 1976, the Plaza was built to accommodate Indian traders evicted by the apartheid government from the main trading street, 14th Street as well as other streets including the eastern and western boundary streets, Delarey and Krause streets of Pageview, Fietas.

== History ==
Red Square was located in Fordsburg, a suburb of Johannesburg. During the 1940s and 1950s, it was frequently the site of political meetings and protests; it was particularly popular with the Communist Party. On 6 April 1952, the Defiance Campaign was launched at the square by James Moroka of the African National Congress and Yusuf Dadoo of the South African Indian Congress, together with many other African, Indian and Coloured leaders. During the campaign, the square was nicknamed Freedom Square by activists.

Forced removals were enforced in the nearby suburb of Pageview (Fietas), destroying the existing vibrant commercial 14th Street and other streets. The Oriental Plaza was built as a compromise between the Johannesburg City Council and the Department of Community Development in the 1970s, in an attempt to reluctantly address the loss of the evicted Indian traders. In the process a substantial part of Fordsburg’s urban fabric including the Red Square was demolished. The Red Square still however holds social, cultural and historical significance.
