= Oriental Plaza =

Shopping centre in Johannesburg, South Africa

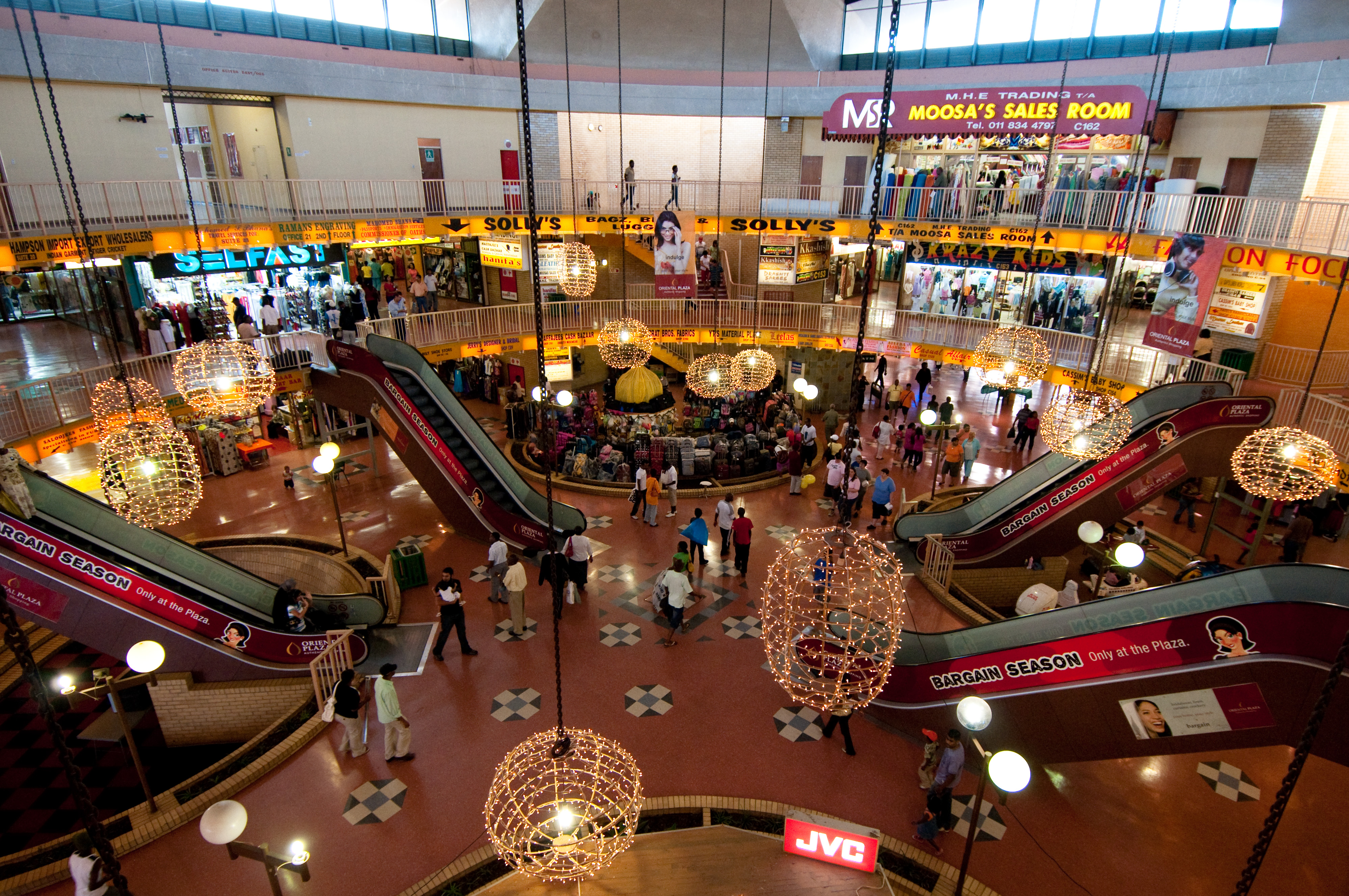
- Location: Cnr Lillian Ngoyi Street and Dolly Rathebe Street, Fordsburg, Johannesburg
- Coordinates: 26°12′15.6″S 28°01′28.6″E
- Opened: 1975; 51 years ago
- Num. of stores: 300
- Floors: 3
- Website: www.orientalplaza.co.za

The Oriental Plaza, known locally as the Plaza is a large shopping centre and tourist attraction in Fordsburg, a suburb of Johannesburg, South Africa. Consisting of multiple connected malls, it was created for Indian traders who were forcibly removed from nearby Fietas by the apartheid government.

== History ==
Fourteenth Street in Fietas was a thriving business node, with shops owned by Indian businessmen. However, the apartheid government insisted, against objections by officials of the Johannesburg City Council, that the area would be "white" under the Group Areas Act. Initially all traders were to be removed to Lenasia, however, a plan was devised by the government's Department of Community Development, and the council, resulted in the development of the Oriental Plaza as a large shopping centre in Fordsburg. Development began in 1971, and it was completed in 1975, with the earliest merchants taking occupation in 1974. The compensation paid to Indian merchants who were evicted from businesses throughout Johannesburg was inadequate, however they were pressured into moving into the plaza. Café (convenience store) owners and general dealers were forced to create shops that sold goods which appealed to white customers, and to compete with merchants who were more experienced in selling those lines. Business was initially tightly controlled by the department, and shops were not allowed to merge. By the 1980s, restrictions eased, and owners were able to buy their premises.

Red Square, a political meeting place in the 1940s and 1950s is now covered by Car Park 4 and the South Mall of the Oriental Plaza.

== In popular culture ==
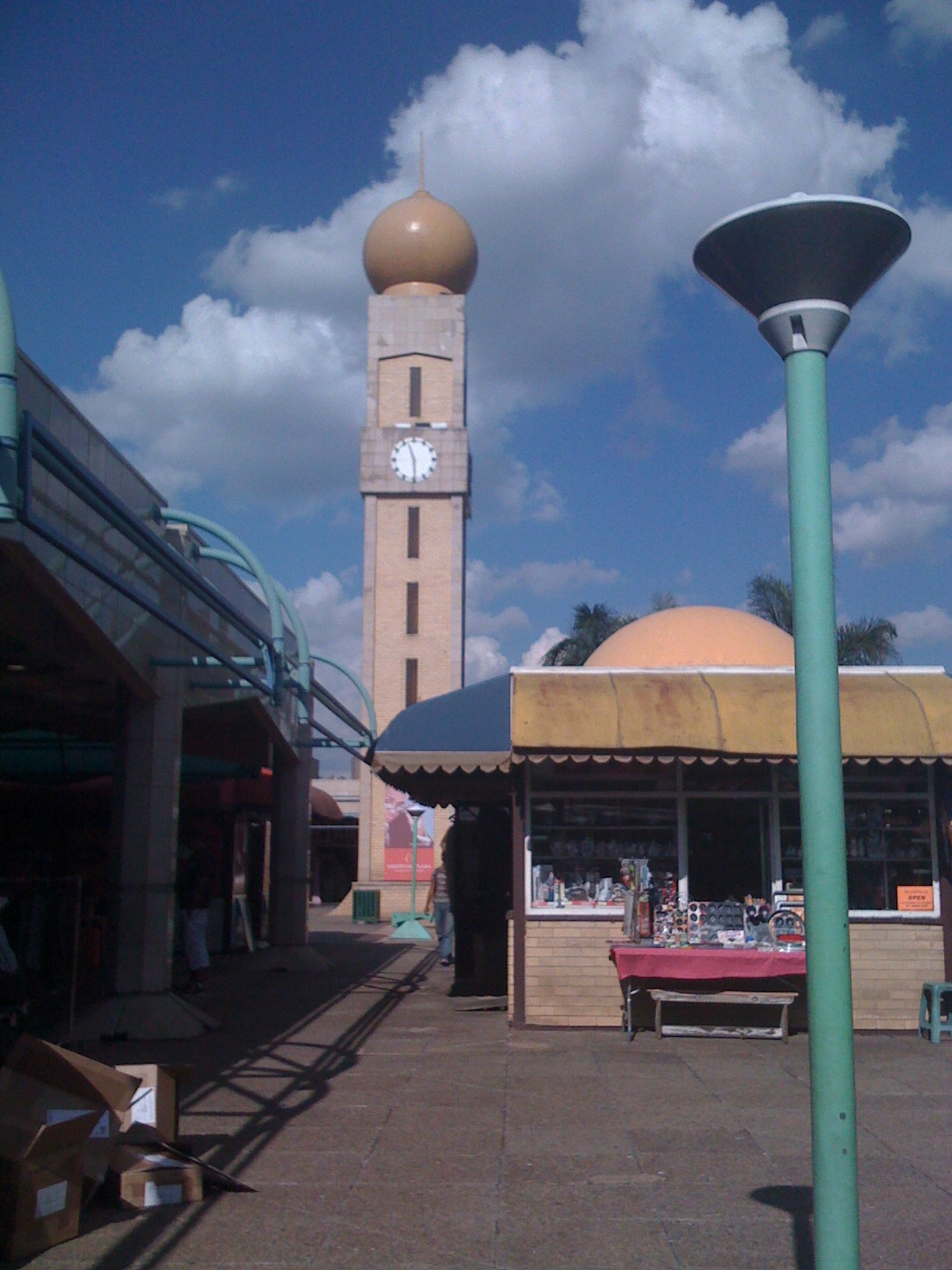
Freestanding minaret on a rooftop courtyard

The Plaza features in the 2012 movie Material, starring Riaad Moosa.

== Other shopping centres ==
There is an Oriental Plaza in Ferndale, Randburg. There is also complex of shops in Marabastad, Pretoria (Asiatic Bazaar) that shares a similar history to the Oriental Plaza.
