= Fordsburg Square =

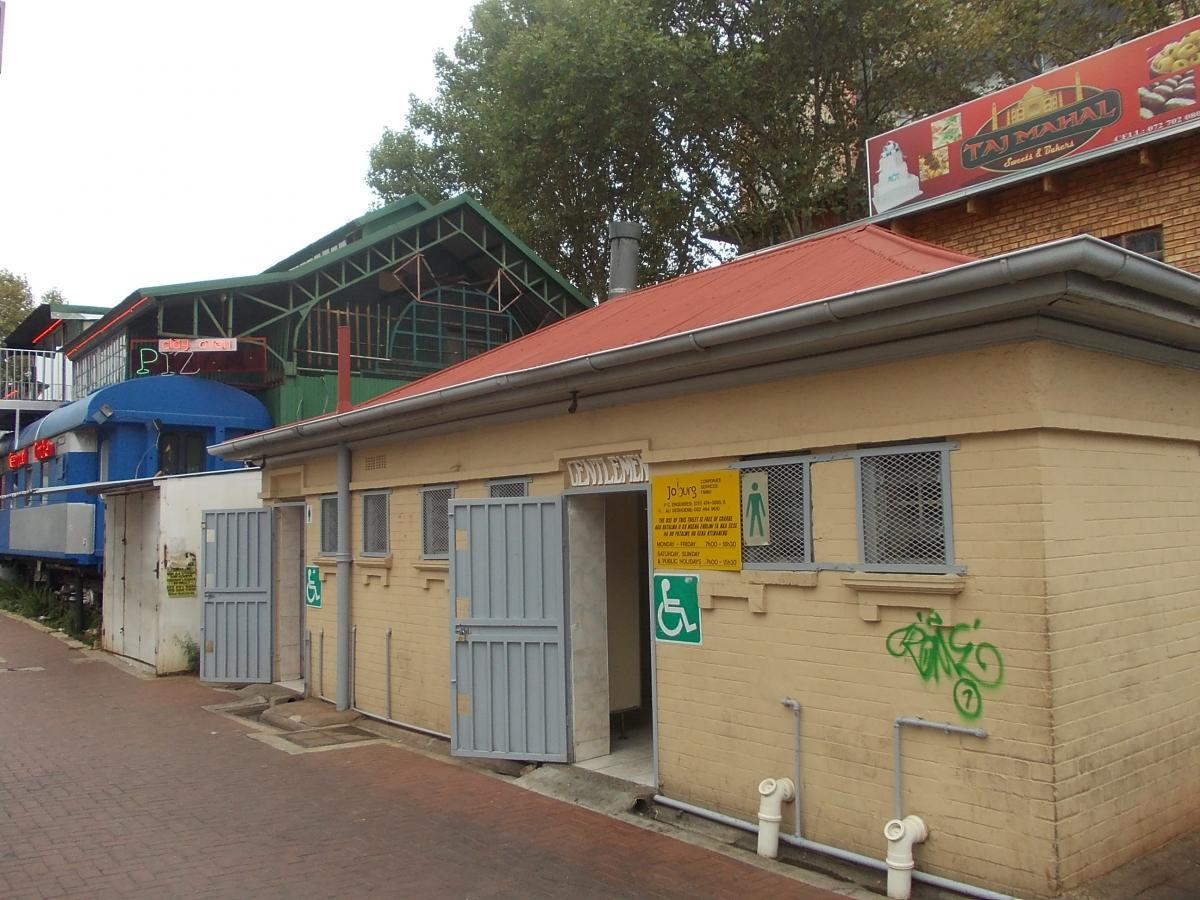
- The toilets are the only building remaining from the battle
- Interactive map of the Fordsburg Square area

General information
- Type: Municipal square
- Location: Mint Road, Fordsburg, Johannesburg, South Africa
- Coordinates: 26.20477°S 28.0209°E

Fordsburg Square in Fordsburg is a thriving square that is the site of a flea market was recently known for being run-down. This square in Johannesburg is the location of a battle between striking miners and the South African police, army and air force.

== Description ==
Fordsburg Square is the site of a flea market that was known for being run-down.

== History ==
The Rand Rebellion against the Jan Smuts government ended here on the 14 March 1922. The rebels involved did not just withdraw their labour but also began to take over areas of Johannesburg, some that they were in control of being Benoni, Brakpan suburbs of Fordsburg and Jeppe. The strike had become an open rebellion and on the 15 March the army was called to bombard the Fordsburg square which was deemed the stronghold of the rebels. By this time the rebels had dug substantial World War I trenches across the square. Even the South African Air Force was called to bomb this square but they hit the nearby Mint Road Presbyterian Church.

== Today ==
One of the buildings that offered protection to the rebels was the municipal toilets and these are still standing and in use. In 2013 a Blue Plaque was added to the side of that building to commemorate the role that the square took in the History of South Africa.
