= George Museum =

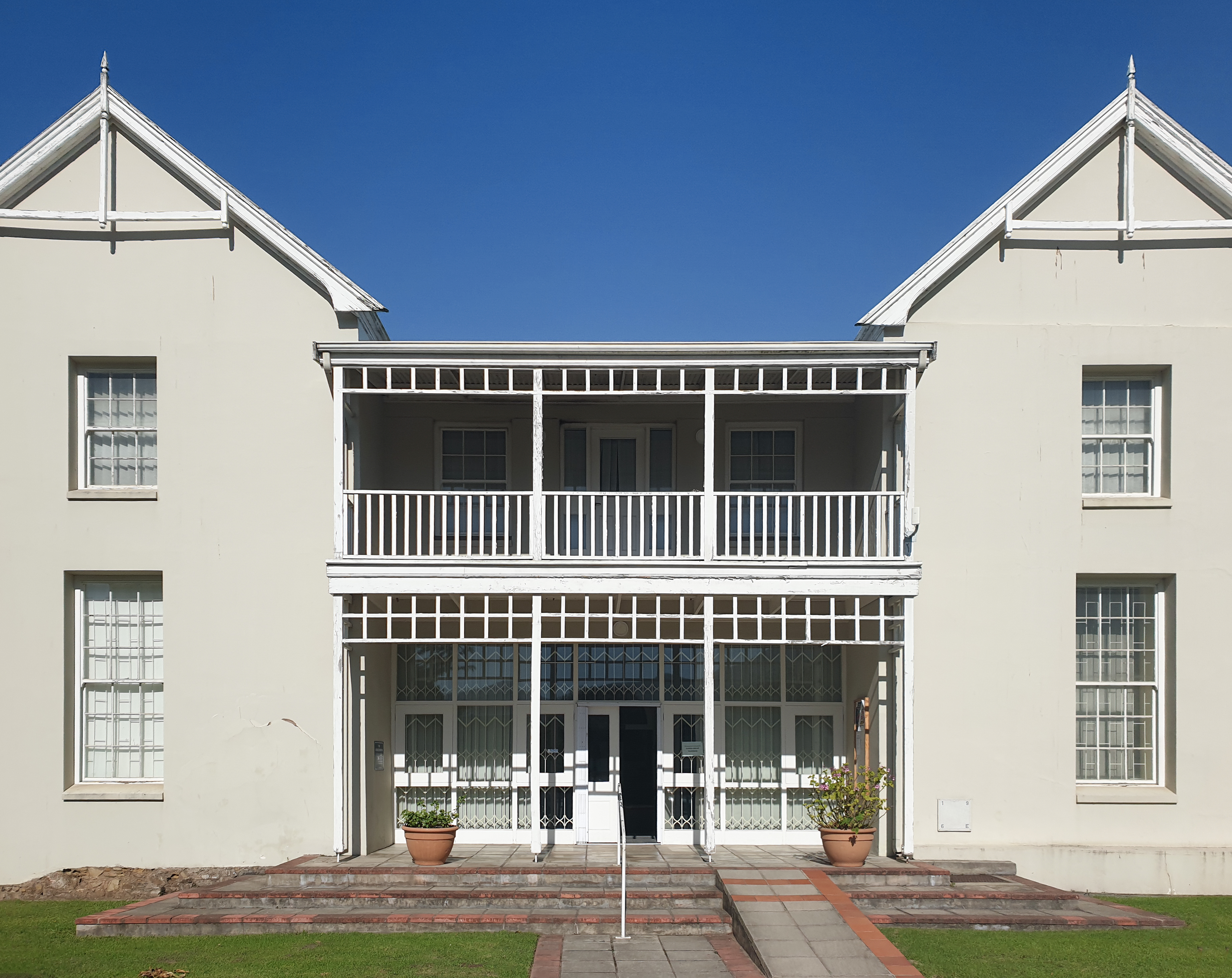
- Established: 1967
- Location: 9 Courtenay Street, George, 6530 (Garden Route District Municipality)
- Coordinates: 33°57′18.43″S 22°27′34.66″E
- Type: Cultural History
- Curator: Lorinda Hakimi
- Owners: Department of Cultural Affairs & Sport (Western Cape Government), South Africa
- Website: http://www.westerncape.gov.za/eng/directories/facilities/131/4616

George Museum is a cultural history museum located in the town of George, Western Cape, South Africa. It preserves the history of the town of George with a special focus on the timber industry. It also houses an art collection. The museum was started by Charles Sayers, in 1967 in a single room in Courtenay Street. The museum is now housed in the building the first magistrate, Adrian van Kervel built as the Drostdy (residency) from 1812 -1815.

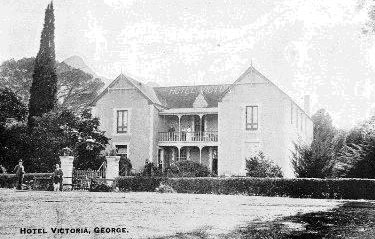
Victorian Hotel (George Museum, Western Cape, South Africa)

== History ==
=== Background of the George Museum ===
What the visitor sees in the George museum today has grown from the private collections of one man, Charles Sayers. He was the owner and long-time editor of the George & Knysna Herald, a newspaper established by his parents in 1881. Sayers collected and preserved all aspects of his hometown's history, with a specialist interest in old mechanical musical instruments. In 1967 he opened his "Mini Museum" to the public, housed in a single room adjoining a café in Courtenay Street. The people loved it and much encouraged by local authorities he moved to the first George Town House – the administrative building next to the market square which dated back to 1847. By now the Sayers Museum had attracted the attention of officialdom and barely six months after the move it attained provincial aided museum status as a fully-fledged cultural history museum for the region, with indigenous timber and its allied industries as its main theme. The growing popularity led to another move, this time to the building, which had been the original drostdy (magistrate's residence and office) in the young town. The original "Mini Museum" has been re-created within the present George Museum. Adrian van Kervel, the first magistrate built the building in 1812–1815 as the Drostdy (residency). In 1826 it burnt down but was re-built. It became the legendary Victoria hotel in the late 19th century until it was sold to the George Municipality in 1972. In 1976 the museum was established here. The Drostdy or now the museum has amazing exhibitions on display. There are examples of the flourishing local Timber industry, old timber tools, implements, a yellowwood woodcutter's cottage and an outdoor selection of labeled indigenous trees are on display.

=== Establishment of George Town ===
The town of George relates to its establishment based on the timber industry. From the beginning of European colonization in South Africa in 1652, timber and the provision of various woods was of paramount importance for the survival of the settlers. Once forest areas near the present Cape Town were exhausted, the search for more timber continued east along the coast. The great forests of the Southern Cape were discovered as early as 1711, but due to their inaccessibility it was only decades later in c. 1777 that the Dutch East India Company(DEIC) established a woodcutters post or “buitepos” where George is today. However, as early as 1772 there was a gradual influx of settlers’ intent on making a living from the forests. In early days the lives and livelihood of the people revolved around the timber industry and the rich forests in the vicinity. .

=== The George Beacon ===
In the George Museum foyer is the original George Beacon which was erected by the DEIC in 1785, by the then Governor of the Cape, Cornelis Jacob van de Graaff to strengthen their claim and to deter the English from trying to stake a claim in Outeniqualand. It was proclaimed a National Monument in 1962 and a heritage object in 1992.

=== Establishment of a new magisterial district ===
On 23 April 1811 the Earl of Caledon, Governor of the Cape of Good Hope, issued a proclamation to form a new Drostdy (magisterial district) in Outeniqualand. He proclaimed that the district and the town, where the Landdrost (later known as the magistrate) would reside, be named after the reigning monarch of England, George III.

=== The Drostdy ===
The plans for the Drostdy were drawn up by the surveyor J. H. Voorman of Swellendam. He was also responsible for the layout of the wide streets. Construction started in 1813. The Drostdy was a double storey with thatched wings and linked by a flat-roofed ground floor hall. The building contractor was a certain Trenk. Various accounts describe the building as being H-shaped. The Drostdy, van Kervel's official office and residence, was completed at the end of 1815. During July 1826 when Landdrost van der Riet (the 2nd Landdrost) and his family were on vacation, a fire nearly destroyed the Drostdy. Luckily the walls and the hall which is under the flat roof were still standing. The authorities originally intended having the Drostdy rebuilt, but eventually they decided to sell the property and in 1830 it passed into the hands of William Hollett. One can accept that when Hollett rebuilt the Drostdy, he would have retained that part of the building under the flat roof which was still intact, as well as such walls as were still standing. During the years that followed the property often changed hands and no doubt each new owner made his own alterations to the building. The thatched roof made way for one of corrugated iron very early on. The wood of the windows was replaced by steel, existing doorways were closed up, and new ones broken in. Parts of walls were demolished and other walls were erected.

== Library and Archives ==
Documents, genealogy, photographs, maps, books and newspapers about the history of George are housed here.

=== Gallery of photographs ===
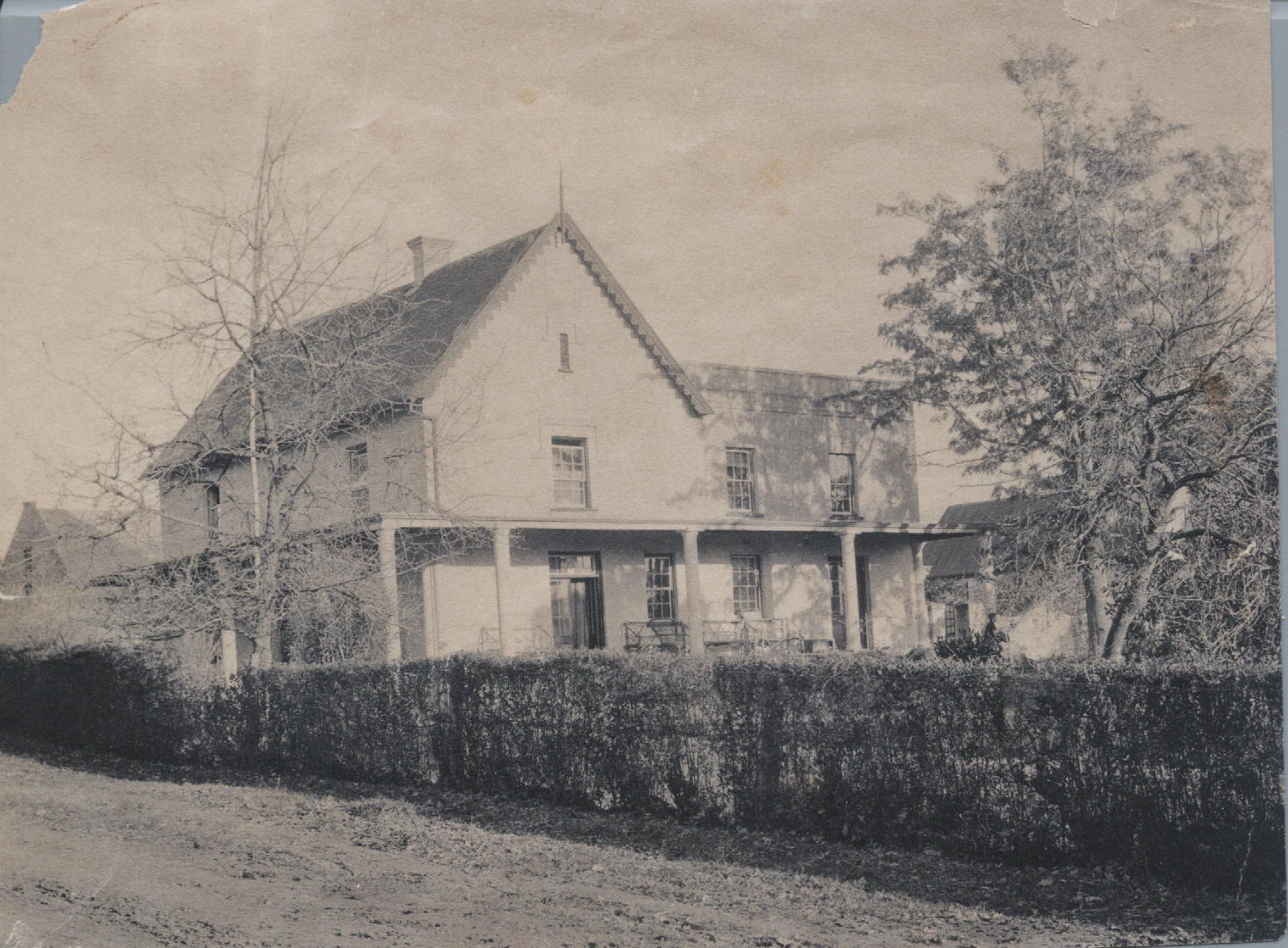
Davidson Road

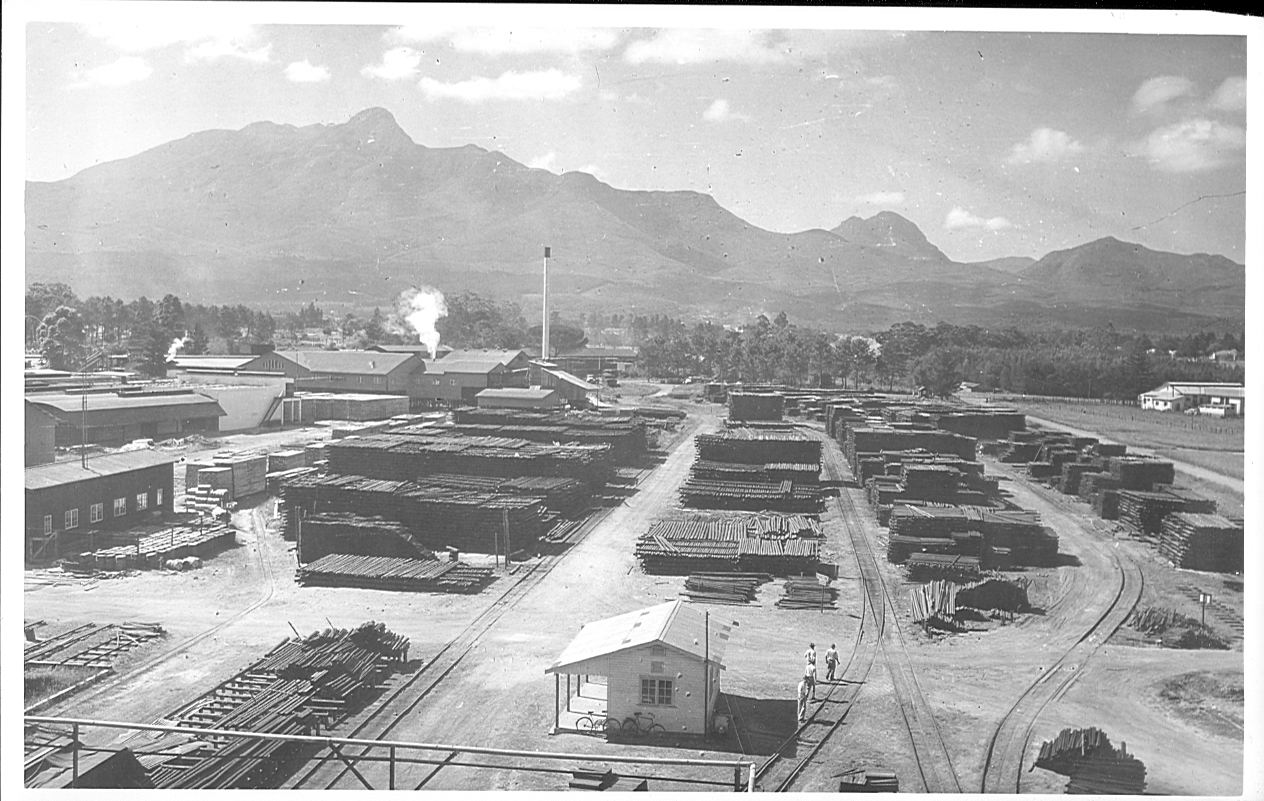
State Saw Mill

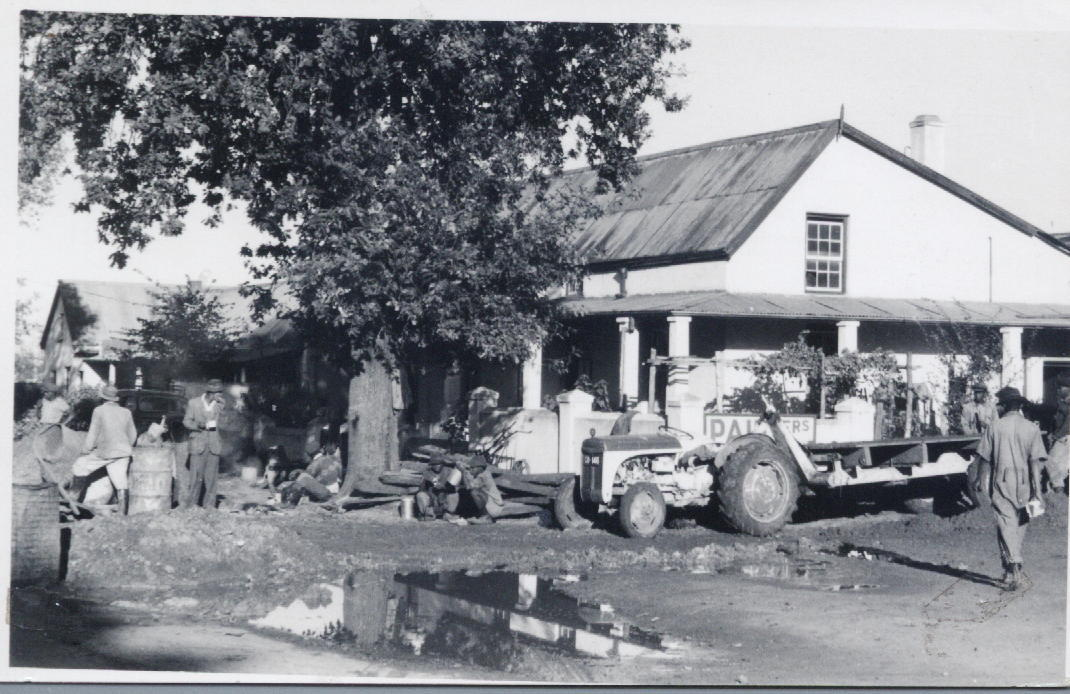
George in the past

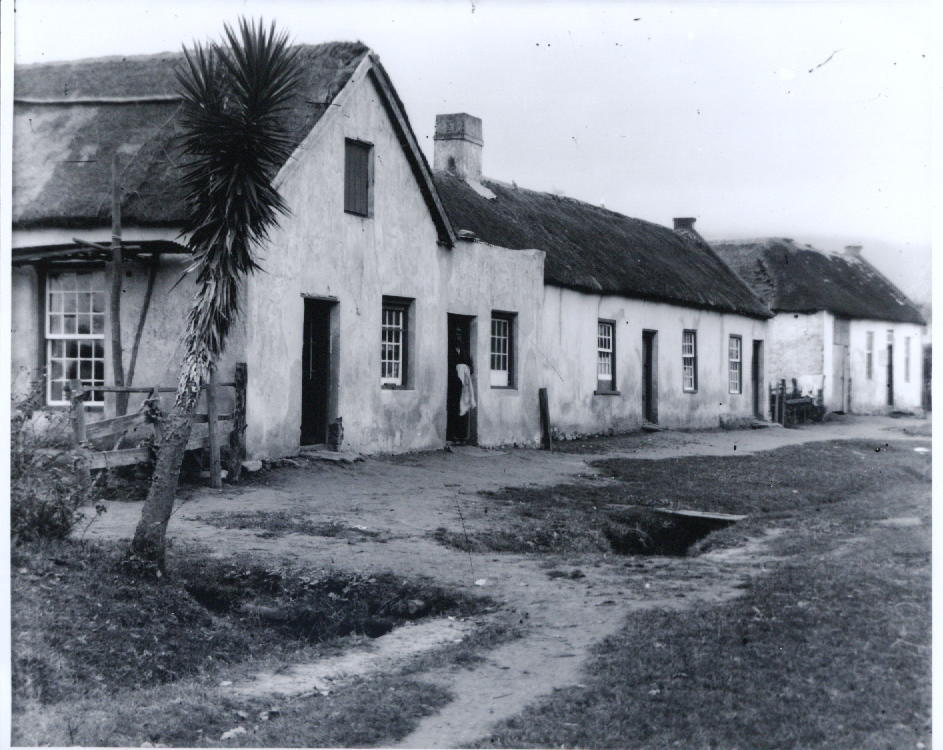
Meade Street

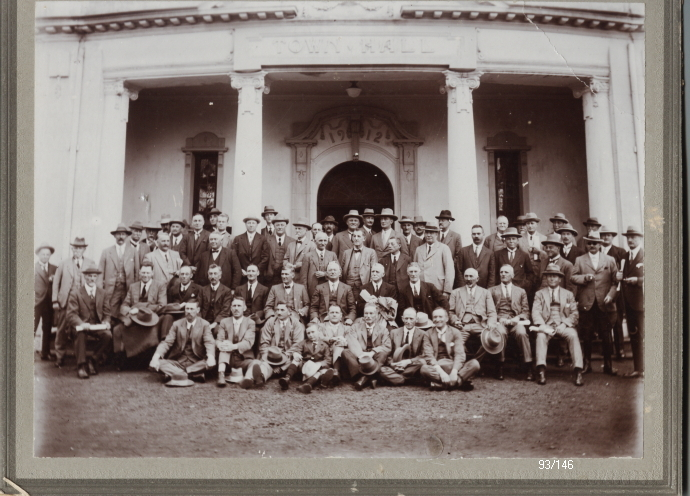
Second Town Hall

== Exhibitions ==
The George Museum strives to make the community more aware of their heritage and to give them a better understanding of their environment through its exhibitions. The museum endeavors to collect and exhibit assets that portray the cultural heritage of George and surroundings. It traces the history of the town to its origins as a DEIC (Dutch East Indian Company) outpost established in the Southern Cape in c. 1777. It soon became the hub of a flourishing timber industry. The museum's main exhibition theme of " Indigenous Woods and Associated Industries of the Southern Cape" focusses on the timber industry of the Southern Cape and the role the industry played in the history of George. The Timber theme is unique in the sense that no other Southern Cape museum has a wood theme as a main theme.

=== Outdoor Complex: Wood Industry Exhibitions ===
The outdoor complex, focussing on the wood industry, consists of plantings of indigenous forest trees, the Timber Museum and a reconstructed yellowwood cottage (c.1910+). This cottage has been furnished according to records of the woodcutters.

From the beginning of colonisation in South Africa, timber and the provision of wood was of paramount importance to the settlers, being used for buildings, furniture, wagons and carts, firewood etc. The Timber Industry Museum focus on the history of the industry and offers an insight into what it was like in the very beginning. On display are an array of woodworking tools that were used for example various axes, grinding stones and the many different kinds of axes that were used.

=== Exhibitions of local historical significance occupy the main building of the museum ===
The Mini Museum is a museum within the Museum. It is designed to recreate an atmosphere of bygone times. The display contains many of the original pieces painstakingly collected by Charles Sayers (founder of the museum) for his beloved museum. George was a prosperous market town in Victorian times and in the late 19th century it became the legendary Victoria Hotel. Typical bedroom, dining and drawing room furniture from this period make interesting exhibits. A collection of mechanical musical instruments, ranging from Swiss musical boxes of 1796 to Edison phonographs of the ate 19th century and His Master's Voice gramophones of the 1900s is also on display.

=== Gallery of special exhibitions ===
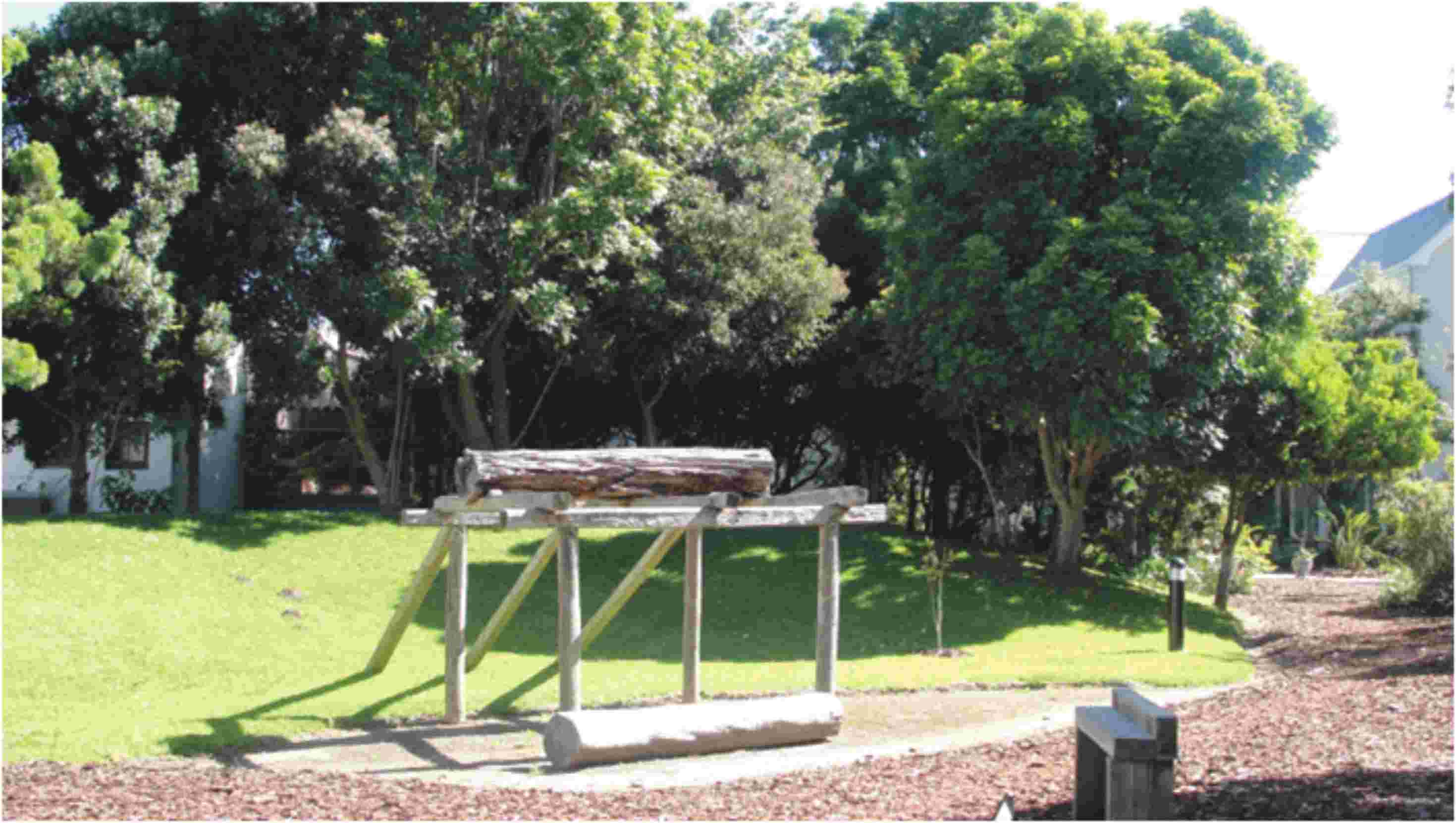
George Museum garden and outdoor complex

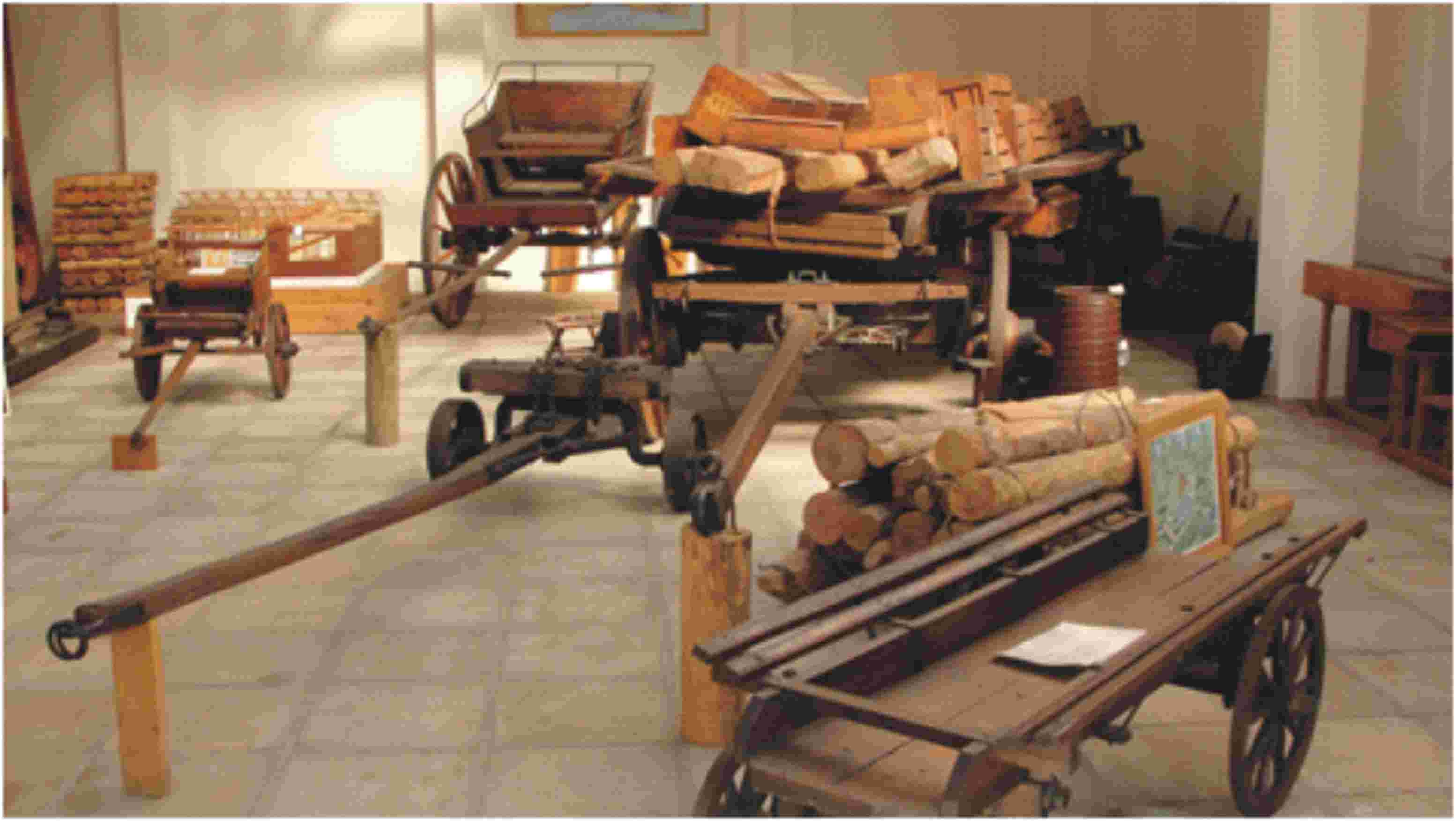
Timber Museum

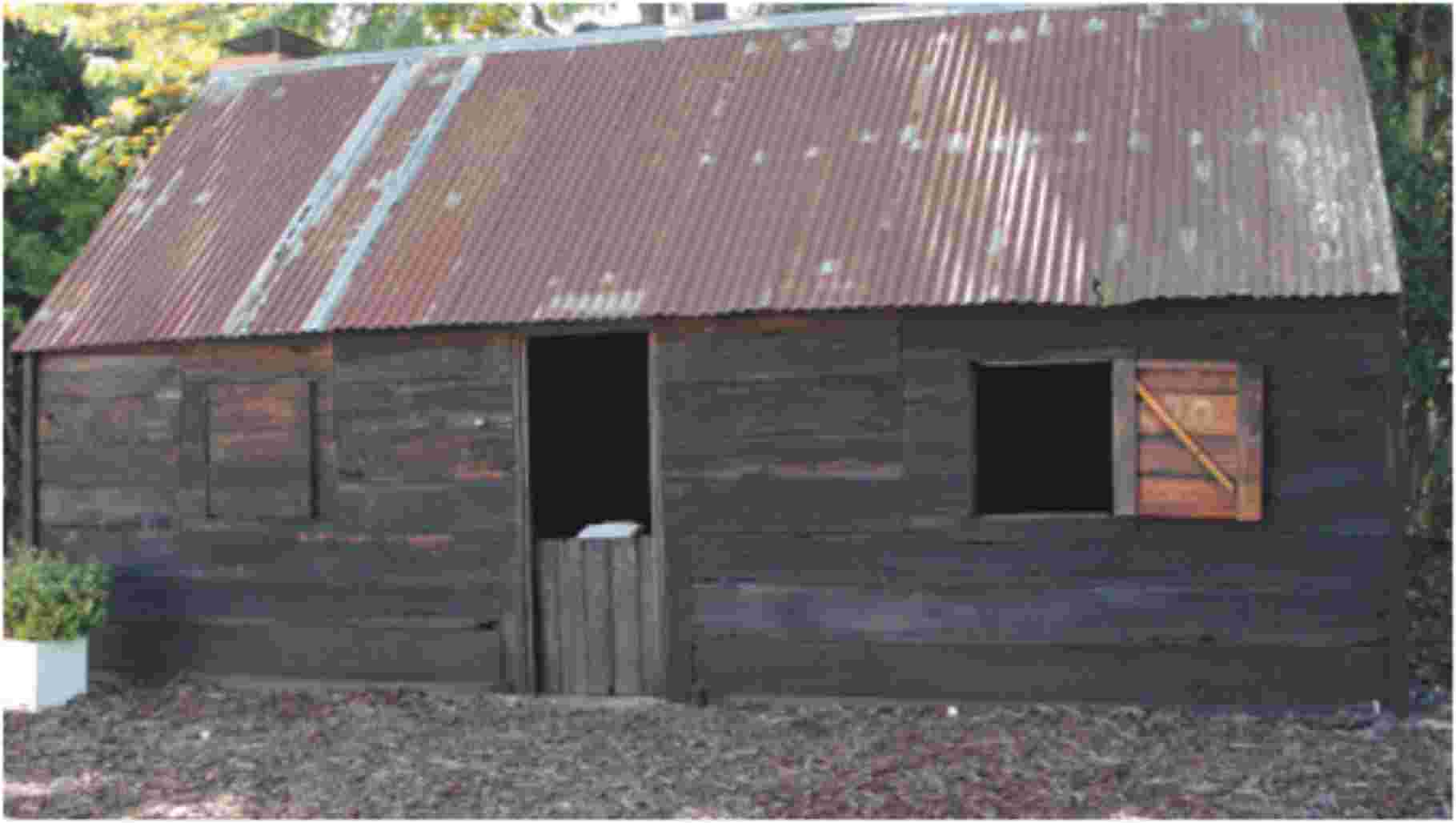
Yellowwood House

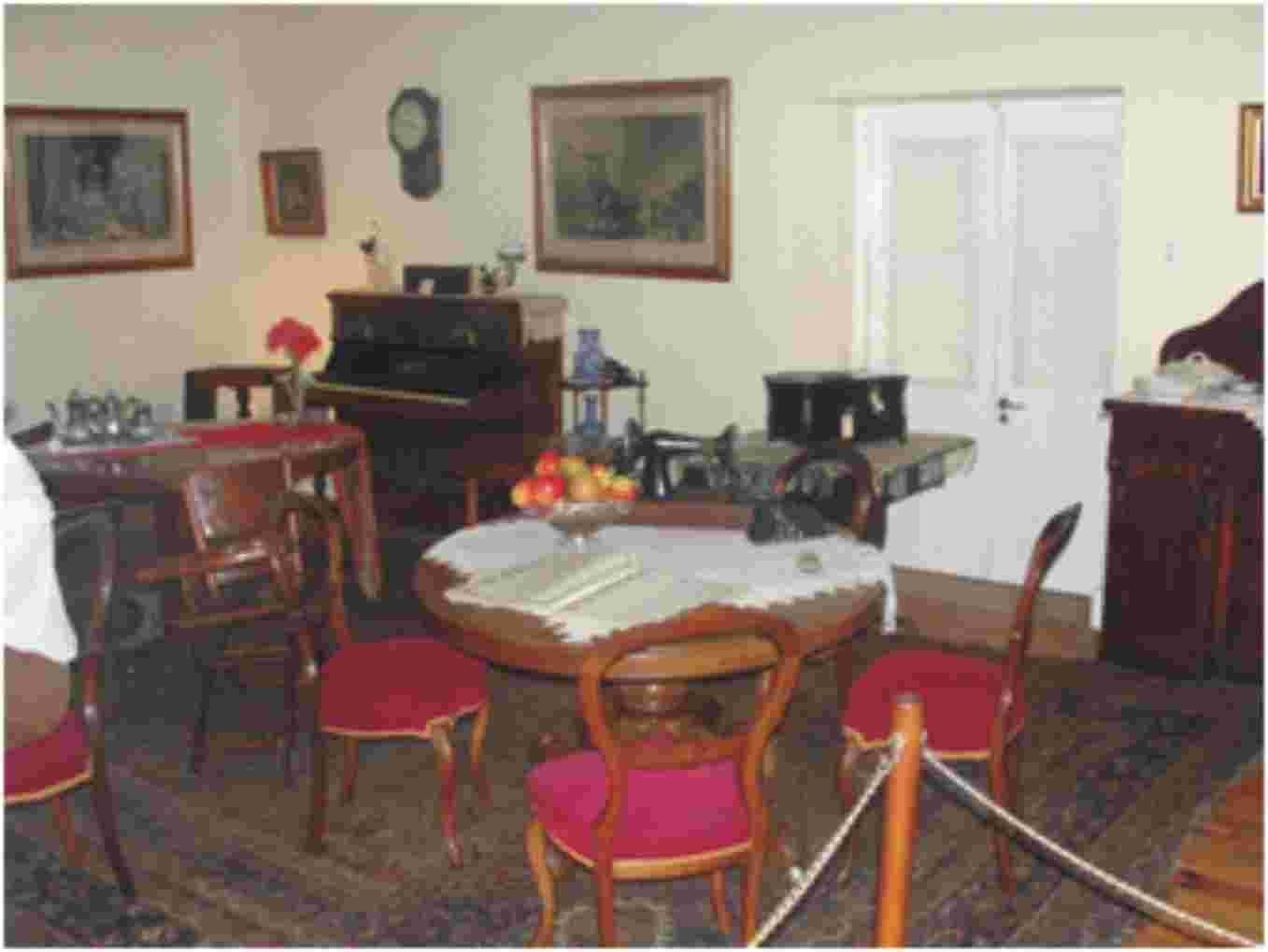
Victorian Dining Room

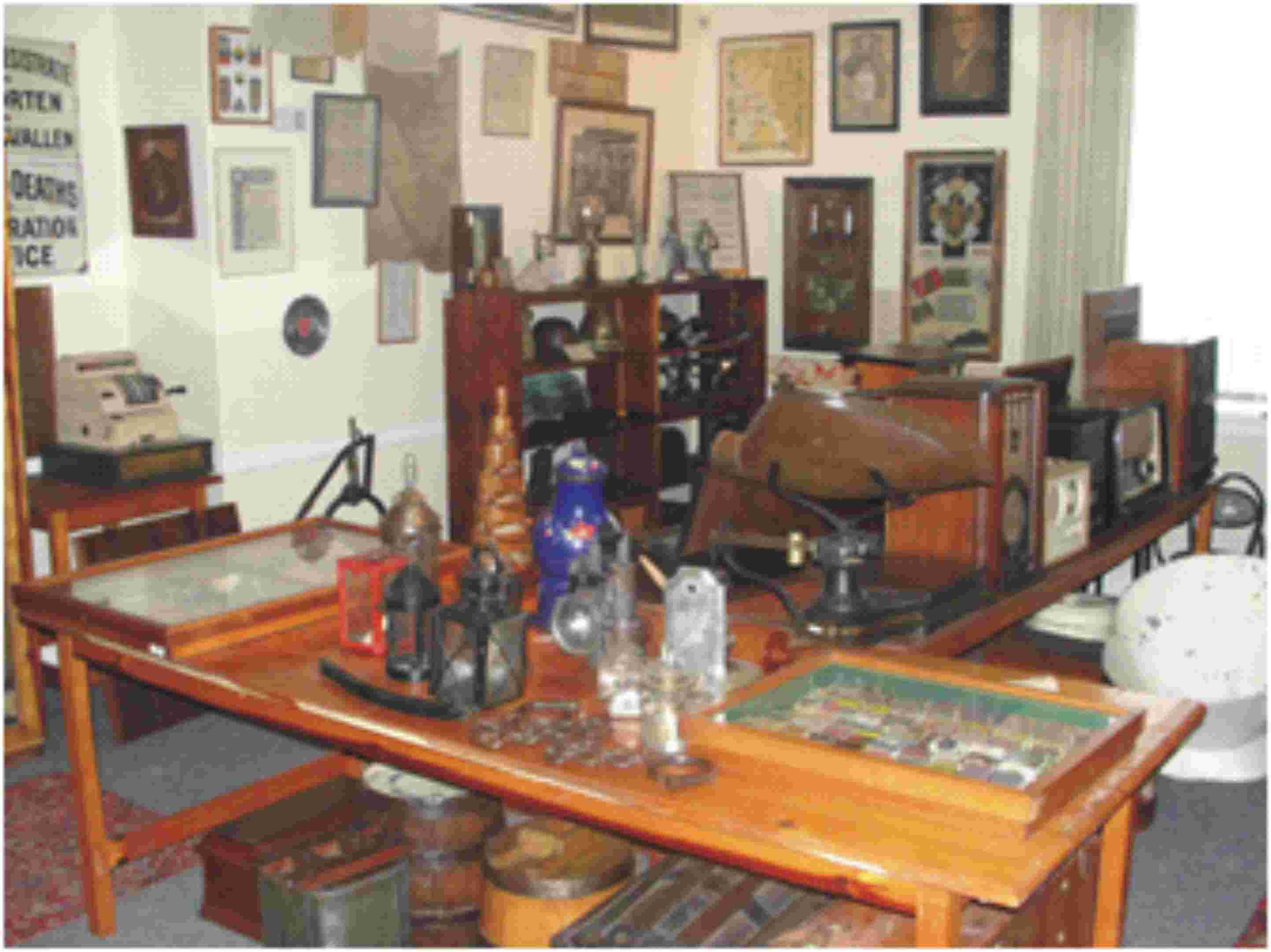
Mini Museum

=== Forced Removals in George ===
This recently added exhibition focuses on the forced removals that took place in George from 1904 to 1989. During the course of the 19th and 20th centuries various laws were introduced in South Africa to remove black communities from land they occupied. This exhibition portrays the communities in George that were forcefully removed and the places of relocation. As there is little information available regarding this important part of history, visitors are requested to identify people in the photographs and also to identify role players in the resistance against the forced removals, in order for the museum to recognise and acknowledge these people. By involving the community in the exhibition, and by providing a way to express their feelings it is possible to establish a sense of belonging, local pride and value in the community by acknowledging that they have something which is unique and of value. By stimulating dialogue and encouraging visitor participation it was possible to acquire valuable information and broaden the scope of knowledge on the subject.

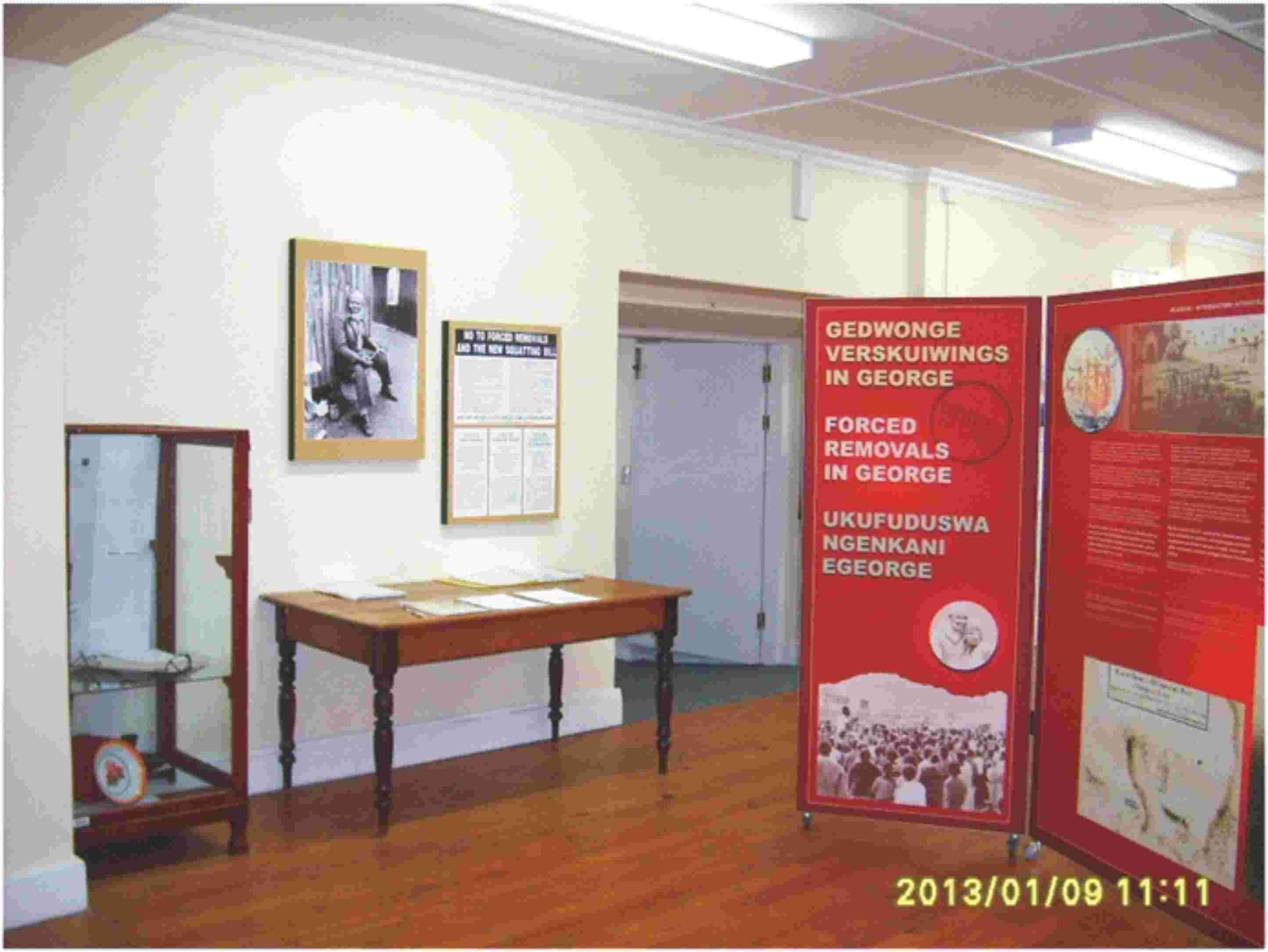
Forced Removals Exhibition

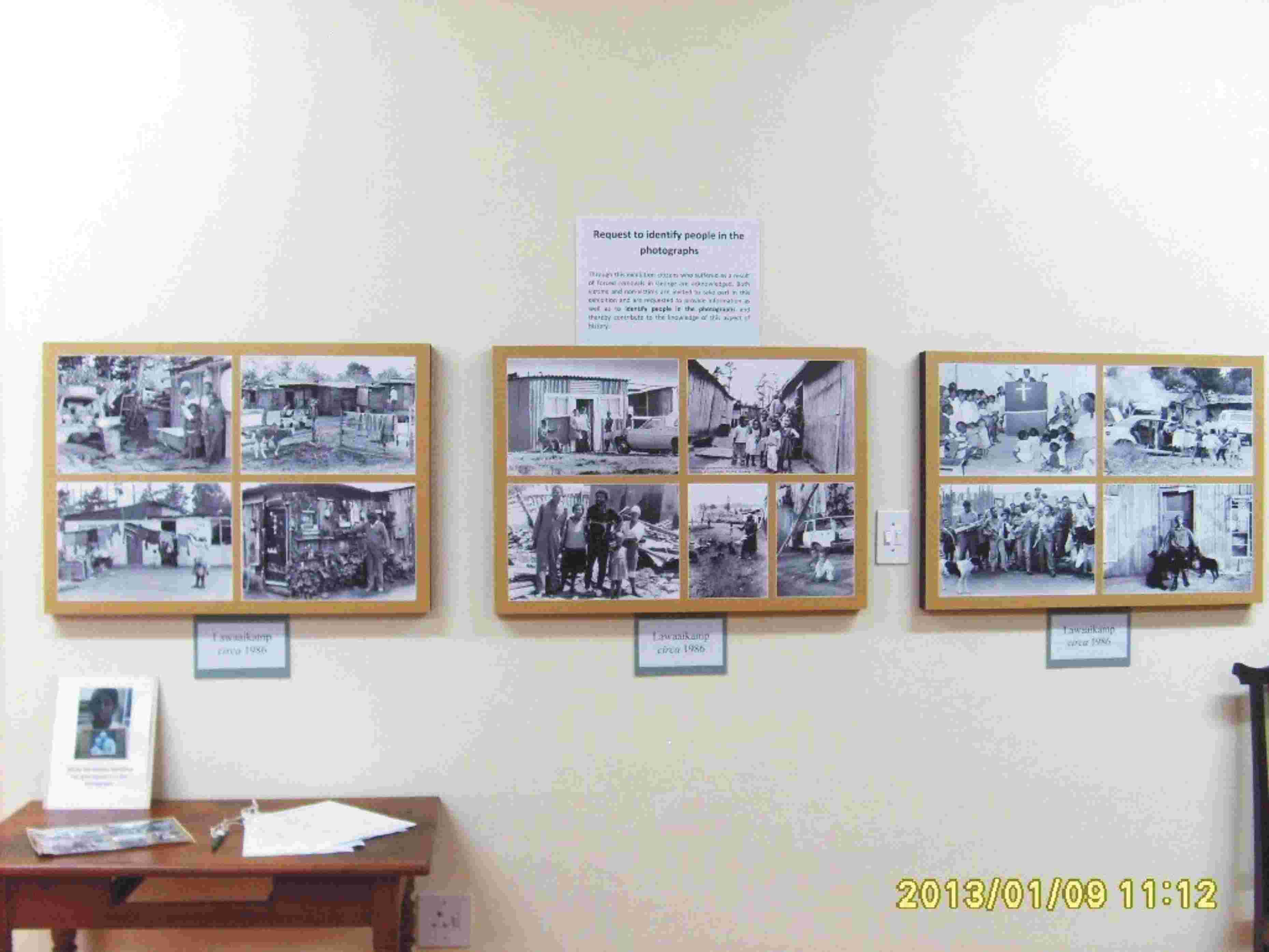
Forced Removals Photographic Display

=== The museum also hosts temporary displays. ===
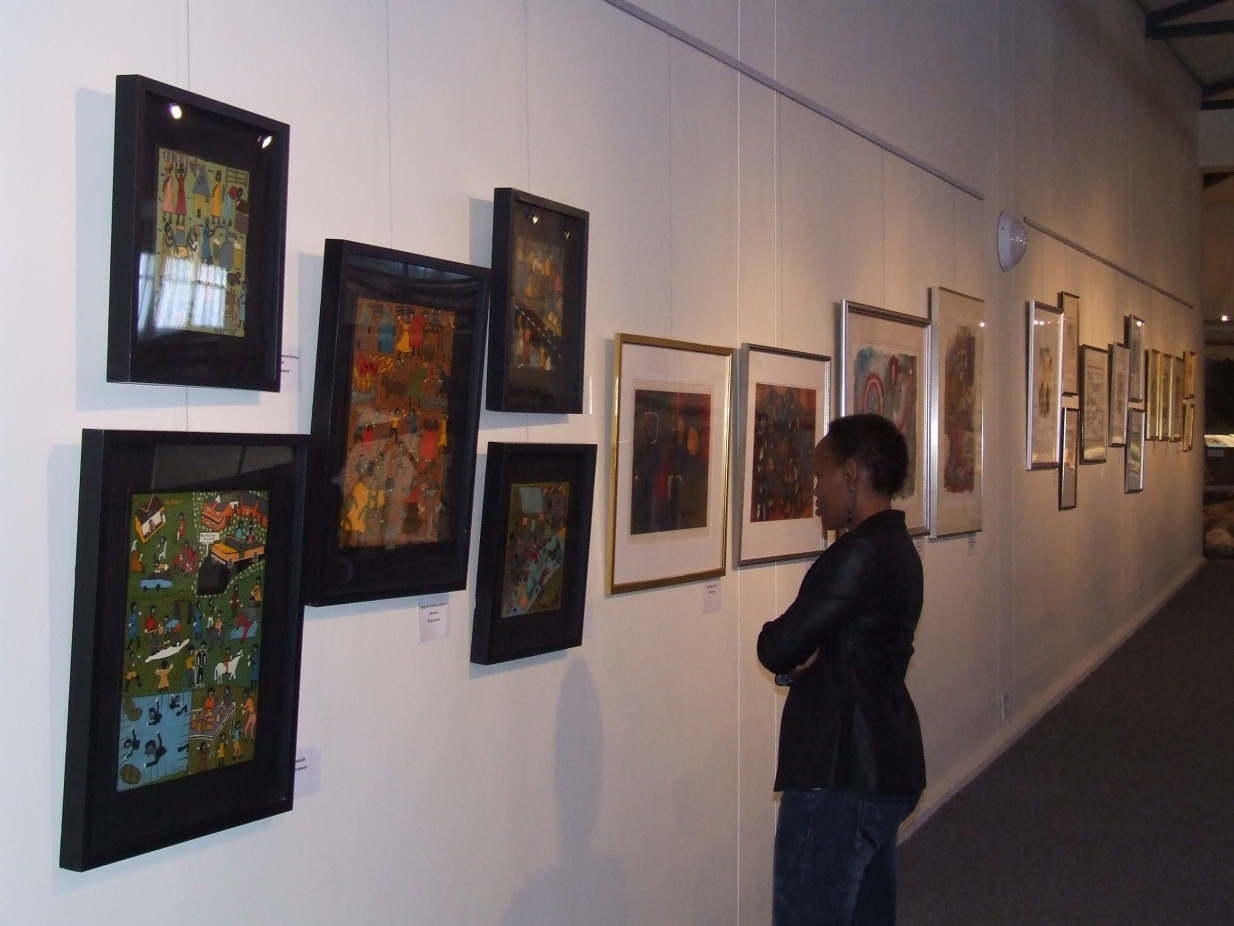
Art exhibition in the Sayers Hall

The Sayers Hall is now an Art Gallery. Presently, selective works from the collection of the Western-Cape Library Service, featuring prominent South African artists, as well as a collection of 2010 soccer memorabilia, also by South African artist are on view.

=== Gallery of sport memorabilia on display ===
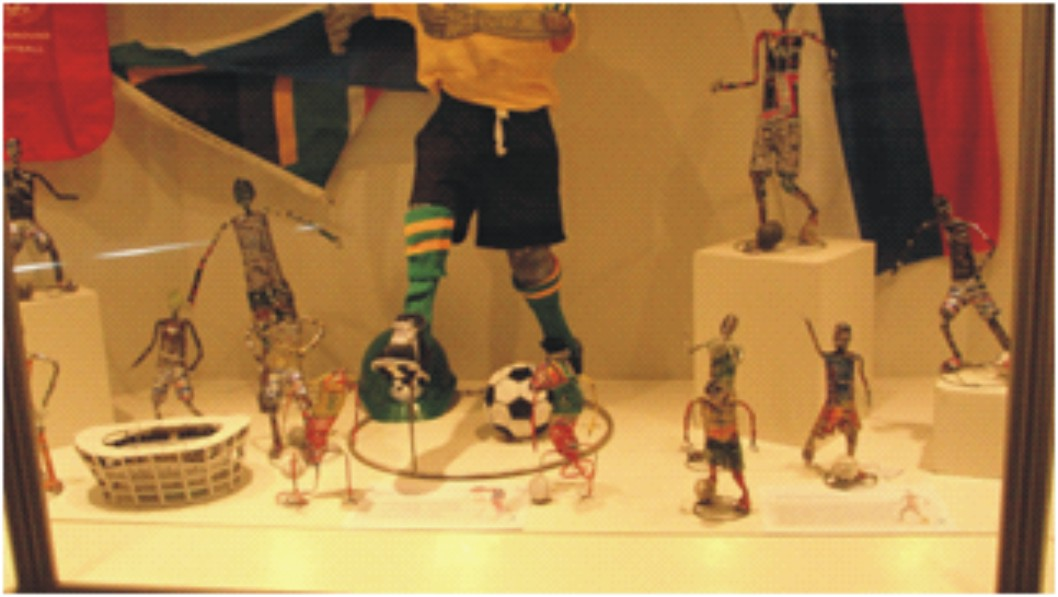
Soccer players made from wire.

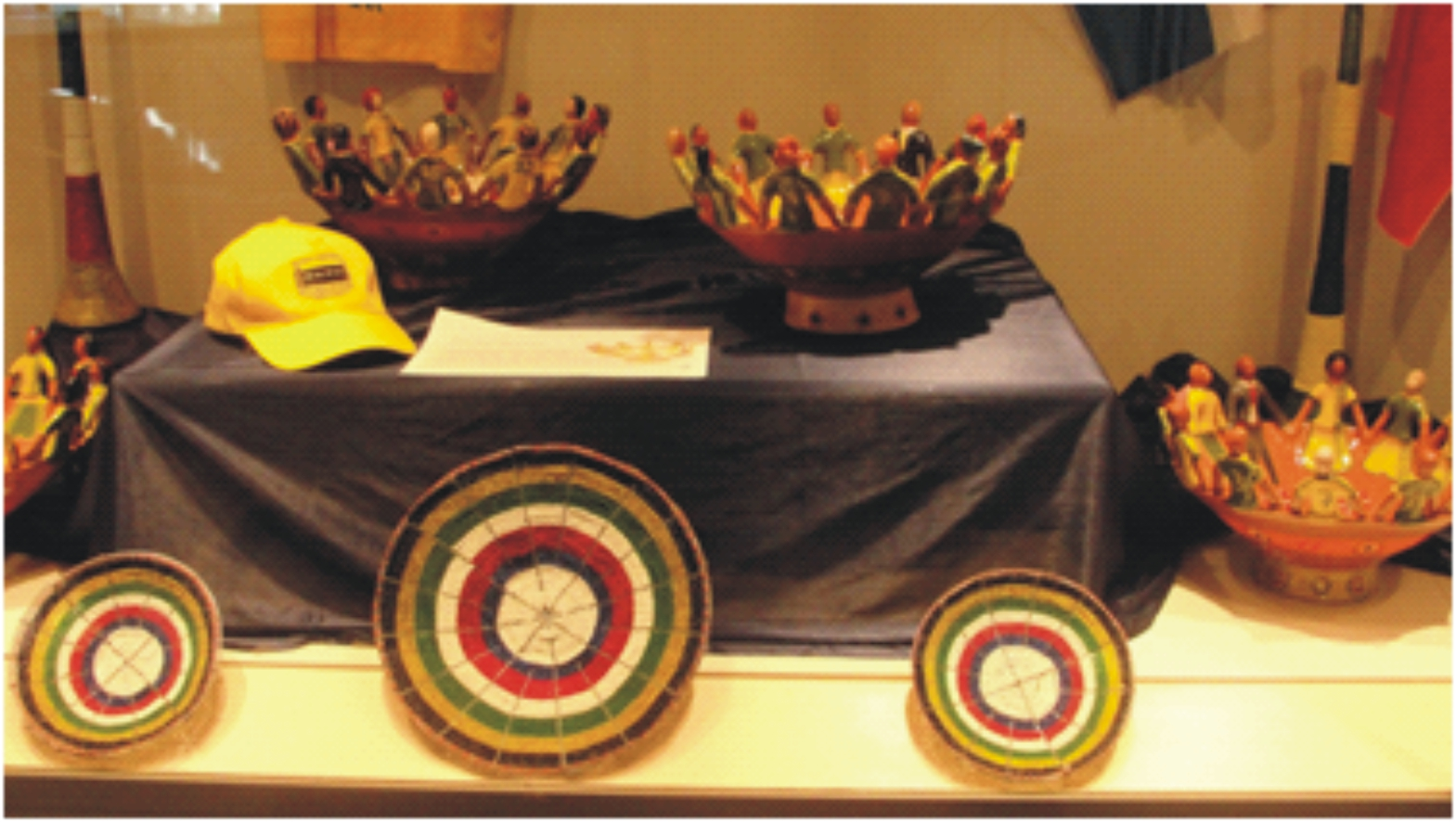
Art works made from wire, beads and ceramics.

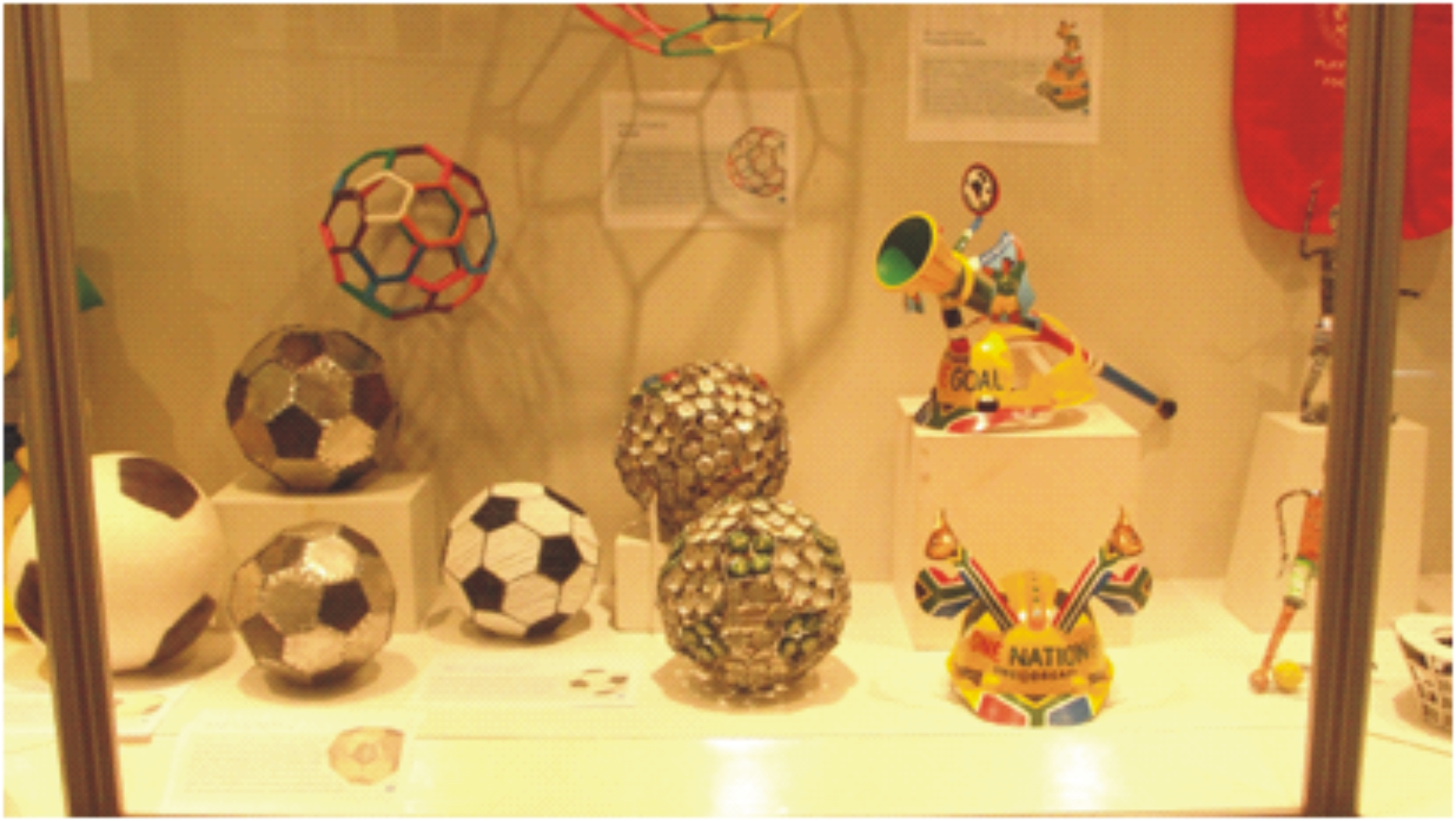
Soccer balls made from a variety of materials.

=== Educational Programmes ===
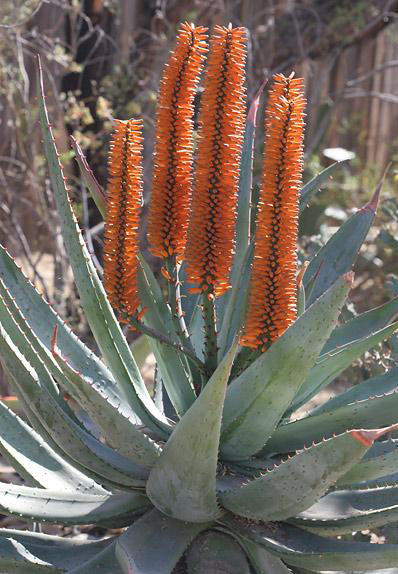
Medicinal plant George Area, Western Cape, South Africa

The George Museum offers a range of educational programs for school groups. The following curriculum-related education programmes are annually presented at the George Museum.

The Architecture of George

The historical buildings in George, built in the 18th and 19th century as well as the different architectural styles are presented (Grade 10/11: Civil Technology and Creative Arts).

Local History Education Programme

The history of George, its first inhabitants, town development, historical buildings and churches are presented (Grade 4: (Social Sciences / History).

Slavery Education Programme

This programme explores the history of slavery in the Southern Cape (Grade 5: Social Sciences / History).

Medicinal plants

Scientists agree that people developed in Africa millions of years back. Thus traditional African medicine is the oldest and most tested type of medicine. Through hundreds of years these recipes were passed on orally from family to family. A lot of these medicines are still being used today. In this programme eight indigenous plants are introduced including a practical: making of medicine(Grade 10/11:Social Sciences: History / Natural Science:Biology).

The history of medicine

The history of western, indigenous and traditional medicine Barnard, Pasteur, Curie) is presented.: (Grade 6 : Social Science/ History).

San/Khoekhoen Education Programme

This programme explores the lifestyle, food, beliefs and clothing of the San/Khoekoen and also includes a practical bracelet making session (Grade 5: Social History / History).

Explorers and Fortune Hunters Education Programme

This programme explores the history of Dias and Da Gama as well as a PowerPoint presentation of the caravel (Grade 6: Social Science / History).

Fossil Education Programme

Powerpoint: What are fossils, reasons for formation, types of fossils and why we study fossils. Clay practical included(Grade 5 - 7: Social Sciences / History).

Ecosystems

This programme introduces learners to the basics of ecosystems (Grade 11: Social Sciences : Geography).

=== Gallery of educational activities ===
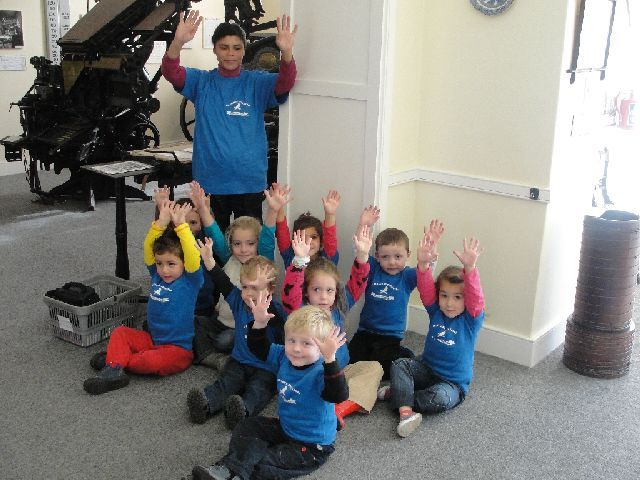
Educational activities

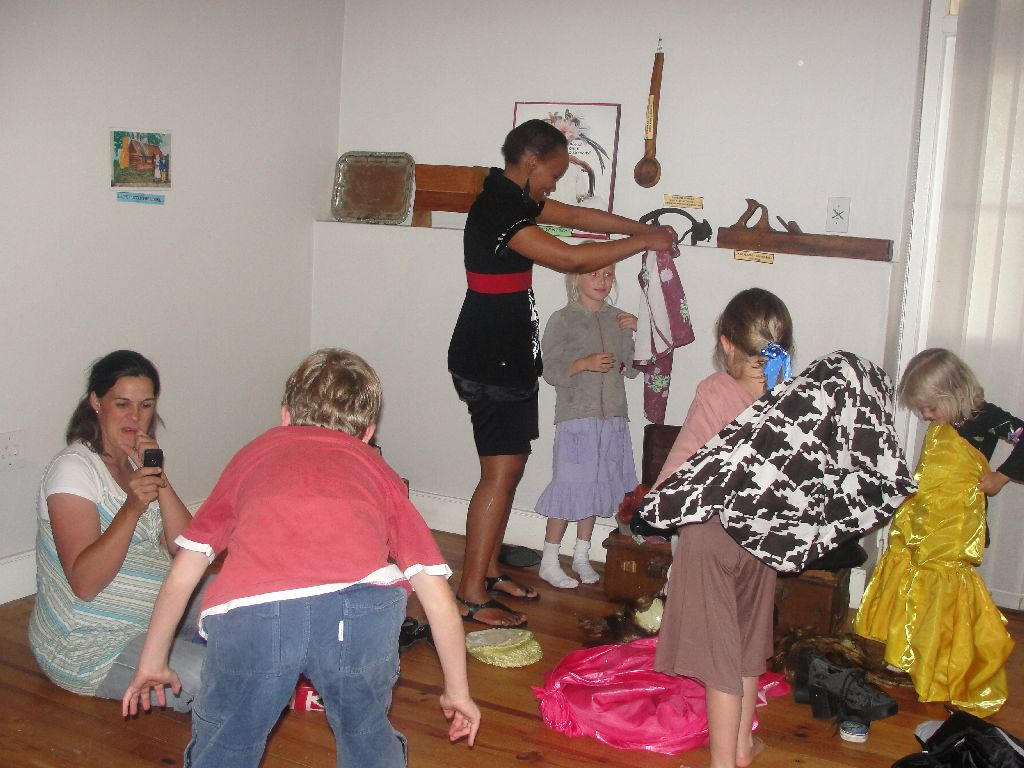
Dressing up

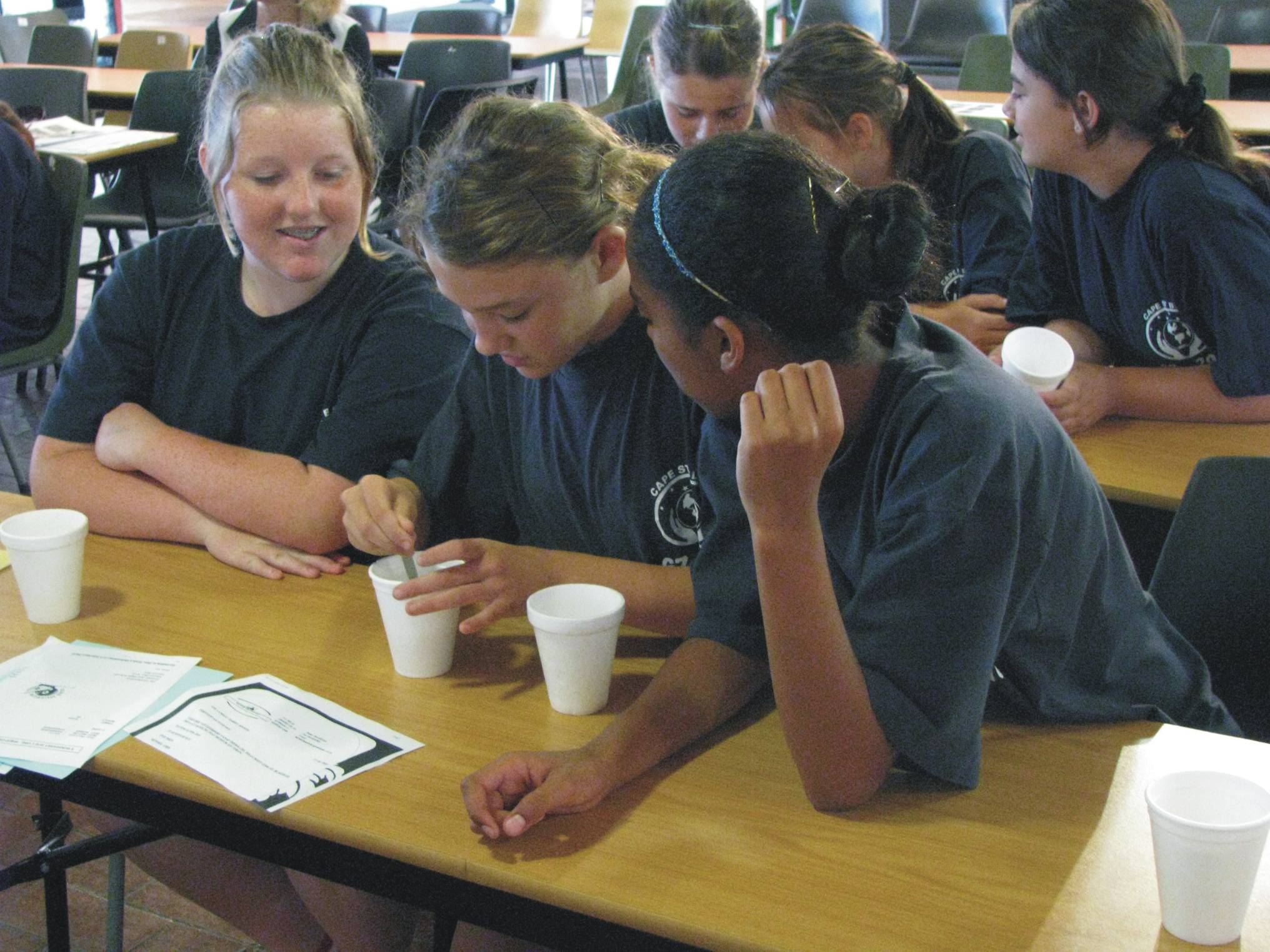
Medicinal plant tea

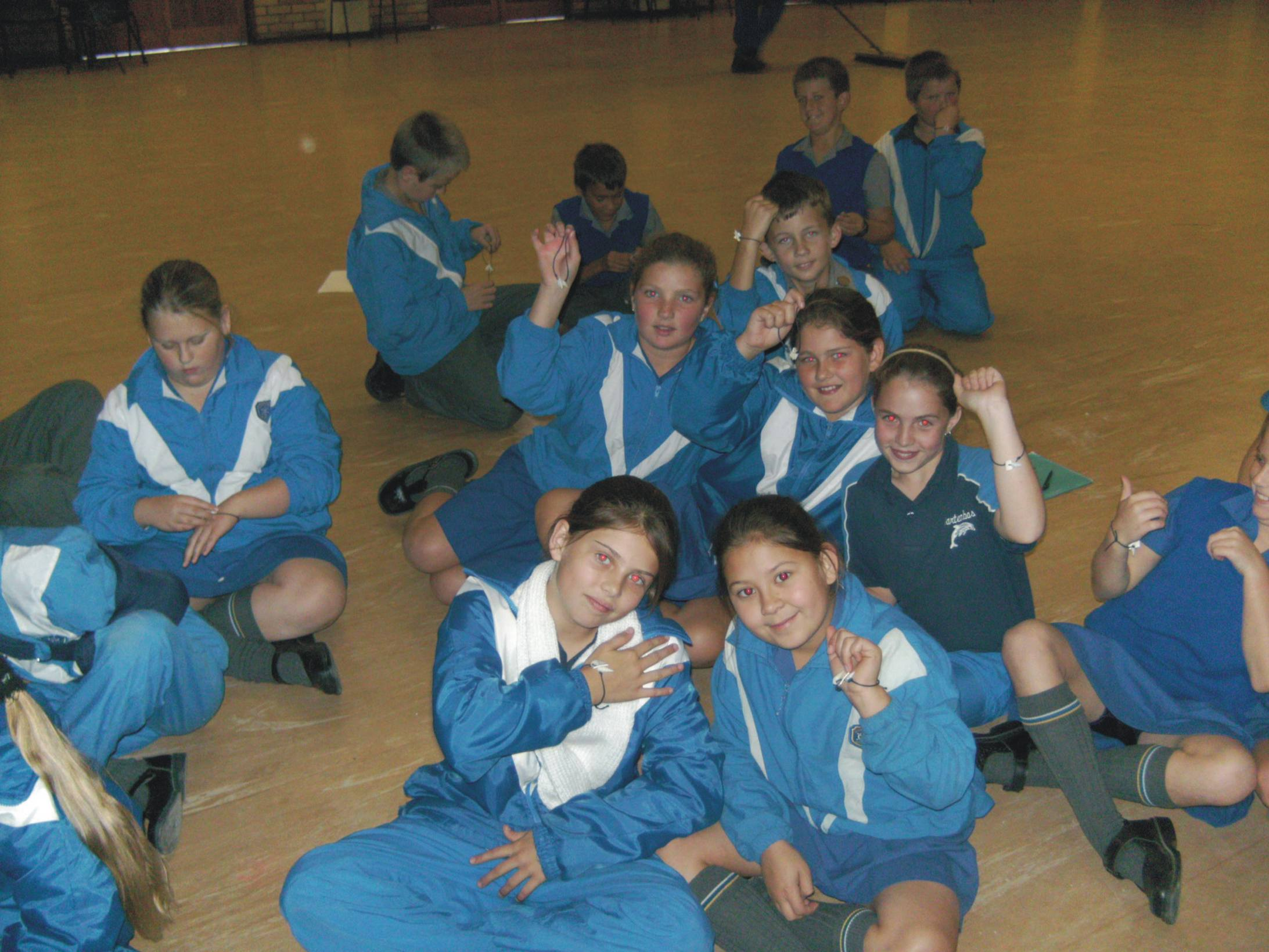
Bracelets made by learners

== Literature ==
- De Jager, D.M. 1942. Gedenkboek van die Gemeente George by geleentheid van die Honderdjarige Herdenking van die Kerkinwyding, 1842–1942. Gedruk deur die George en Knysna Herald.
- Burden, M.2009. Strukture, Styke en Stories: 'n Interpretasie van Kerkargitektuur in George. Paper presented at National Congress of the Society for Cultural History held in George.
- Du Preez, I.F. 1987. From mission station to Municipality. Published by the Municipality of Pacaltsdorp. George Printing CC. George.
- Parker, S. 1993. The Development of George. Historical survey 1811–1975. University of Port Elizabeth. Department of Architecture.
- Sayers, C. 1982. Looking back on George. Herald Phoenix (Pty)Ltd. George.
- Stals, E.L.P. 1961. George. Die verhaal van die dorp en distrik. UItgegee deur die Munisipaliteit en Afdelingsraad van George. Pro Ecclessia Drukkery. Stellenbosch.
