= Fordsburg =

- Location within Gauteng Location within South Africa
- Coordinates: 26°12′24″S 28°1′24″E
- Country: South Africa
- Province: Gauteng
- Municipality: City of Johannesburg
- Main Place: Johannesburg

Area
  - Total: 0.55 km^{2} (0.21 sq mi)

Population (2011)
  - Total: 2,350
  - Density: 4,300/km^{2} (11,000/sq mi)

Racial makeup (2011)
  - Black African: 46.2%
  - Coloured: 2.1%
  - Indian/Asian: 50.0%
  - White: 0.3%
  - Other: 1.4%

First languages (2011)
  - English: 43.6%
  - Zulu: 15.1%
  - Tswana: 5.0%
  - Xhosa: 4.5%
  - Other: 31.8%
- Time zone: UTC+2 (SAST)
- Postal code (street): 2092
- PO box: 2033

Fordsburg is a suburb of Johannesburg, South Africa. It is located in Region F of the City of Johannesburg Metropolitan Municipality. Fordsburg is a residential suburb, although housing numerous shops and factories.

Today, Fordsburg is a major centre of Indian and Pakistani culture, with a large number of halal restaurants. The Oriental Plaza, located in Fordsburg, was created by the Apartheid government as a large shopping centre for Indian-owned shops, and is a major attraction in Fordsburg. The suburb was portrayed in the 2012 film Material, which highlighted some of the cultural, racial and religious issues still facing South Africa's post-apartheid society.

From the earliest days of Johannesburg, the suburb housed a large Jewish community - with the Fordsburg/Mayfair Hebrew Congregation established in 1893 - as well as associated institutions such as a Kosher butchery, chevra kadisha, welfare organisations and Bet midrash.

== 1922 Miner's strike ==
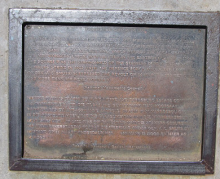
Old 1922 plaque in Fordsburg Square.

Fordsburg was the site of a miners strike by Afrikaner nationalists and many Communists. Mine bosses insisted on using African labour in the mines. White workers opposed this policy, and Smuts called in the troops and airforce. This strike is also known as the Rand Rebellion. A plaque in Fordsburg Square records the people who were killed there in the last battle of the rebellion.

Writer Herman Charles Bosman and playwright Athol Fugard, as well as anti-apartheid activists such as Yusuf Dadoo, GM Naicker and Nelson Mandela spent time in Fordsburg. In 1987, writer/composer Mbongeni Ngema rehearsed his new musical Sarafina! there, in preparation for a run at the Market Theatre and then Lincoln Center Theater in New York.
