= Margate Art Museum =

Art museum in Margate, South Africa

- Location within South Africa
- Established: 1994
- Location: Lot 1000, Don Pienaar Square, Viking Road, Margate (Ugu District Municipality)
- Coordinates: 30°45′12″S 30°22′55″E
- Type: Art Gallery
- Website: visitmargate.co.za/margate-art-museum

Margate Art Museum is an art museum in Margate in the KwaZulu-Natal province of South Africa. It is the largest art museum in KwaZulu-Natal.

== Location ==
Margate Art Museum is in the same vicinity as the Margate Hall and the municipal offices of the Ray Nkonyeni Local Municipality between Cook Street, Viking Road and Newton Road. It is located just west of the Margate Central Business District (CBD).

== Opening days ==
Entrance to the museum is free and the museum is open from Tuesday to Saturday. It is open from 08:30 to 16:00 from Tuesday to Friday and from 08:30 to 14:00 on Saturdays.
