= Fietas Museum =

Museum in Pageview, Gauteng, South Africa

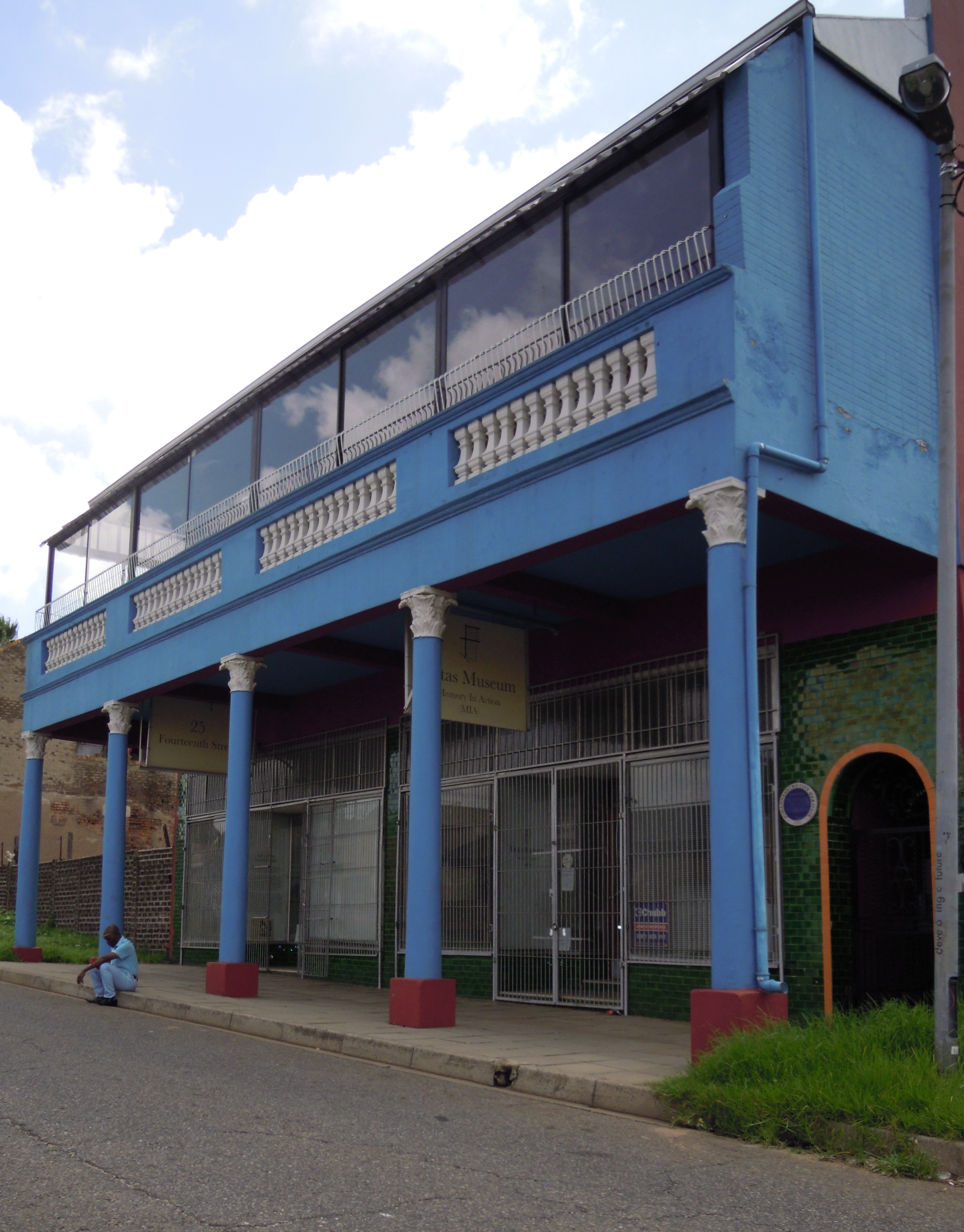
- Fietas Museum
- Established: 24 September 2013
- Location: 25 14th street, Pageview, Johannesburg
- Coordinates: 26.196552°S 28.018842°E
- Type: Apartheid
- Curator: Salma Patel
- Website: http://www.gauteng.net/attractions/attraction-fietas-museu-mmemory-in-action-mia

Fietas Museum was opened on 24 September 2013, the museum is located in Pageview, Gauteng, South Africa. The building that the museum is housed in is one of the few to survive the forced removals under the Group Areas Act and was declared a Heritage resource in 2007.

== Fietas ==
Fietas was the unofficial name given to the suburb of Pageview in its heyday between 1940 and 1965. During apartheid, the government attempted to exert control over the growing 'non-White' population of Johannesburg, by setting up 'locations' along racial lines.

Pageview was initially earmarked for 'Malay', 'Cape Coloured' and 'Coloured' people. By the 1940s, the population had become predominantly 'Indian' and 14th Street into a popular shopping destination but this came to the attention of the government and the area was re-zoned as a whites only area under the Group Areas Act. 14th street in particular was a subject of interest in one of Nat Nakasa's writings. The following quote appears on the windows of the museum entrance doors:

Well-known Nationalists come all the way from the platteland to buy in Fourteenth Street. It is possible to find members of the Johannesburg Stock Exchange or a City Councillor’s wife waiting to be served after an African labourer in Fourteenth Street.

— QUITE A PLACE, FOURTEENTH STREET
