= Franschhoek Motor Museum =

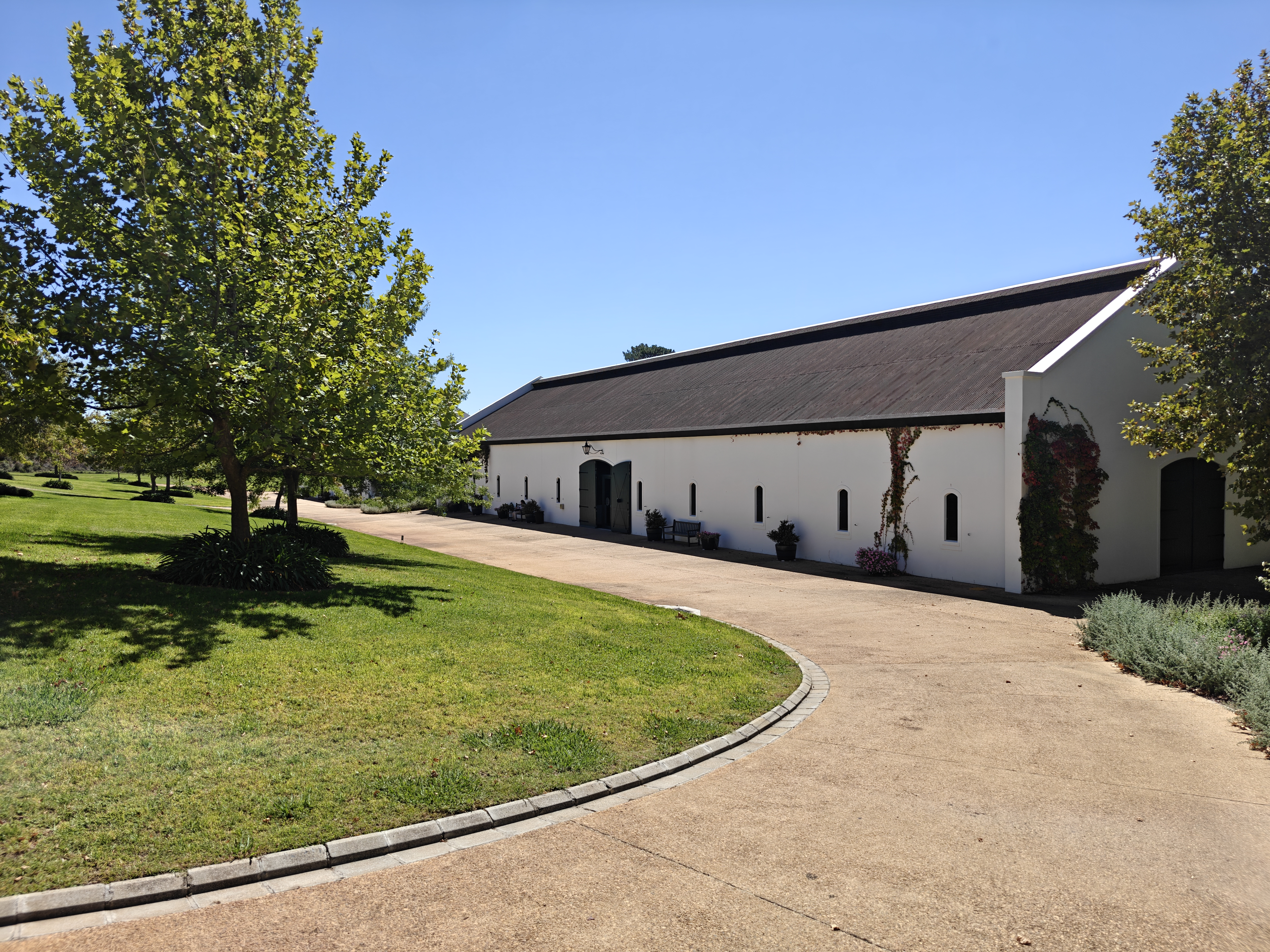
- The Franschhoek Motor Museum courtyard and one of the vehicle display buildings
- Established: 7 May 2007; 19 years ago
- Location: Franschhoek, Western Cape, South Africa
- Coordinates: 33°52′47″S 19°00′11″E
- Type: Automobile museum
- Founder: Johann Rupert
- Owner: Johann Rupert
- Parking: Surface lot on site
- Website: fmm.co.za

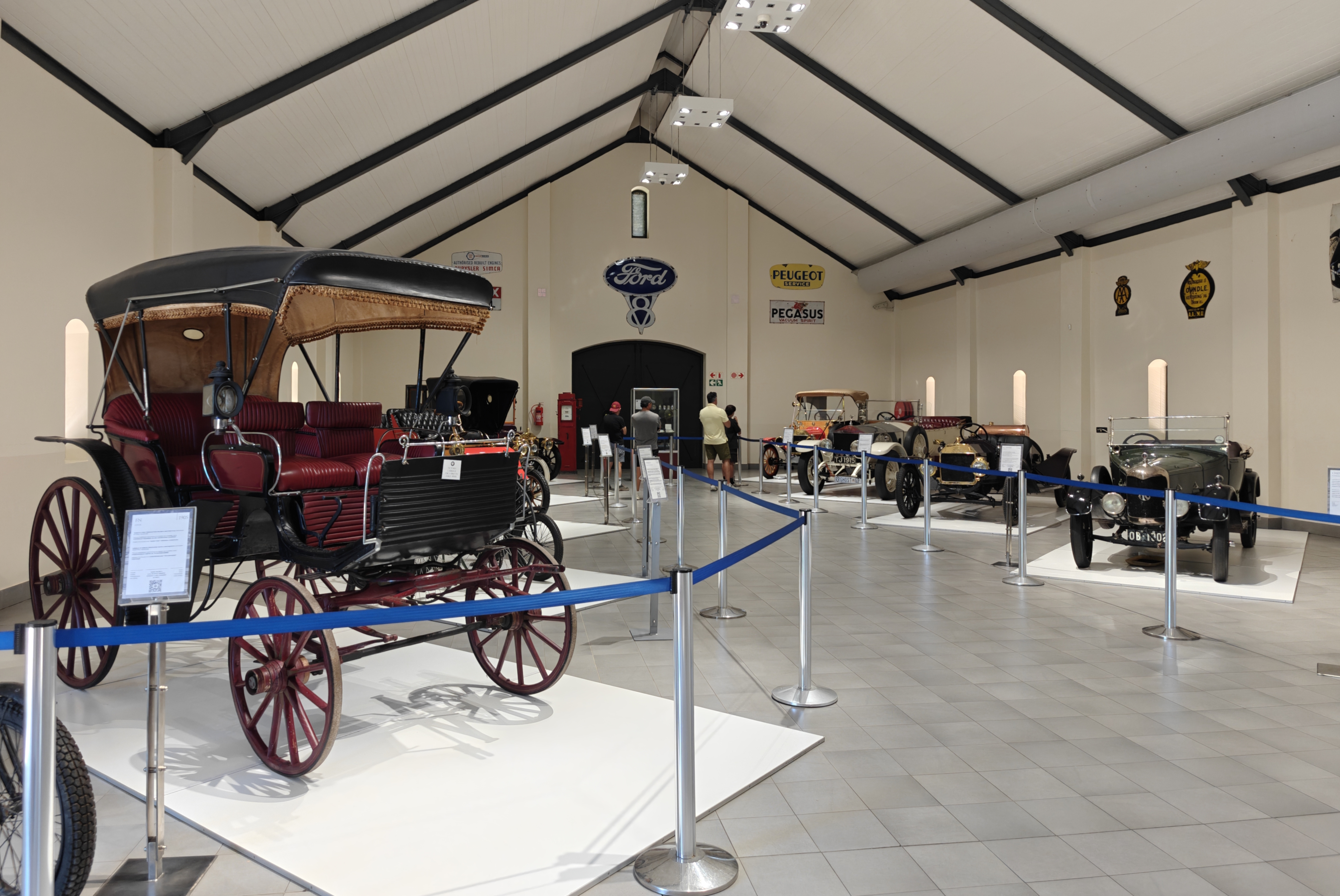
Cars on display in one of the museum's four buildings

The Franschhoek Motor Museum is an automotive museum that maintains a rotating collection of vehicles, motorcycles, and bicycles dating back over 100 years. Opened in 2007, it is owned by South African billionaire Johann Rupert.

The Motor Museum is situated on the L’Ormarins Estate, a wine estate in Franschhoek, in the Western Cape province of South Africa, which is also home to Rupert Wines.

The museum is located roughly 70 kilometers from Cape Town, a city which has been ranked as one of the top three globally for its car culture.

== History ==
The Franschhoek Motor Museum has its origins in the Heidelberg Museum, which was opened by Anton Rupert in 1974. In 1999, the museum was bought by British American Tobacco, and was closed by the company in 2003.

In 2004, Johann Rupert, Anton's son, bought his father's car collection and moved it to the L’Ormarins Estate, a wine estate in Franschhoek.

The Franschhoek Motor Museum opened to the public in May 2007.

== Collection ==
The museum is housed in four separate, dehumidified buildings, all facing a courtyard. Total floorspace is around 2,700 sqm. The collection has over 200 vehicles, 80 of which are on display at any given time.

Vehicles are displayed on rotation, so visitors have a different experience each time they go to the FMM. The collection has vehicles built in South Africa and overseas, and portrays the evolution of the automobile. It is categorized as follows:

- Antique – built before 31 December 1904
- Veteran – built between 1 January 1905 and 31 December 1918
- Vintage – built between 1 January 1919 and 31 December 1930
- Post-Vintage – built between 1 January 1931 and 31 December 1945
- Post-45 – built between 1 January 1946 and 31 December 1960
- Post-60 – built after 1 January 1961

As of March 2026, the museum houses vehicles from 1877 through 2021.
