= Pageview, Johannesburg =

Pageview
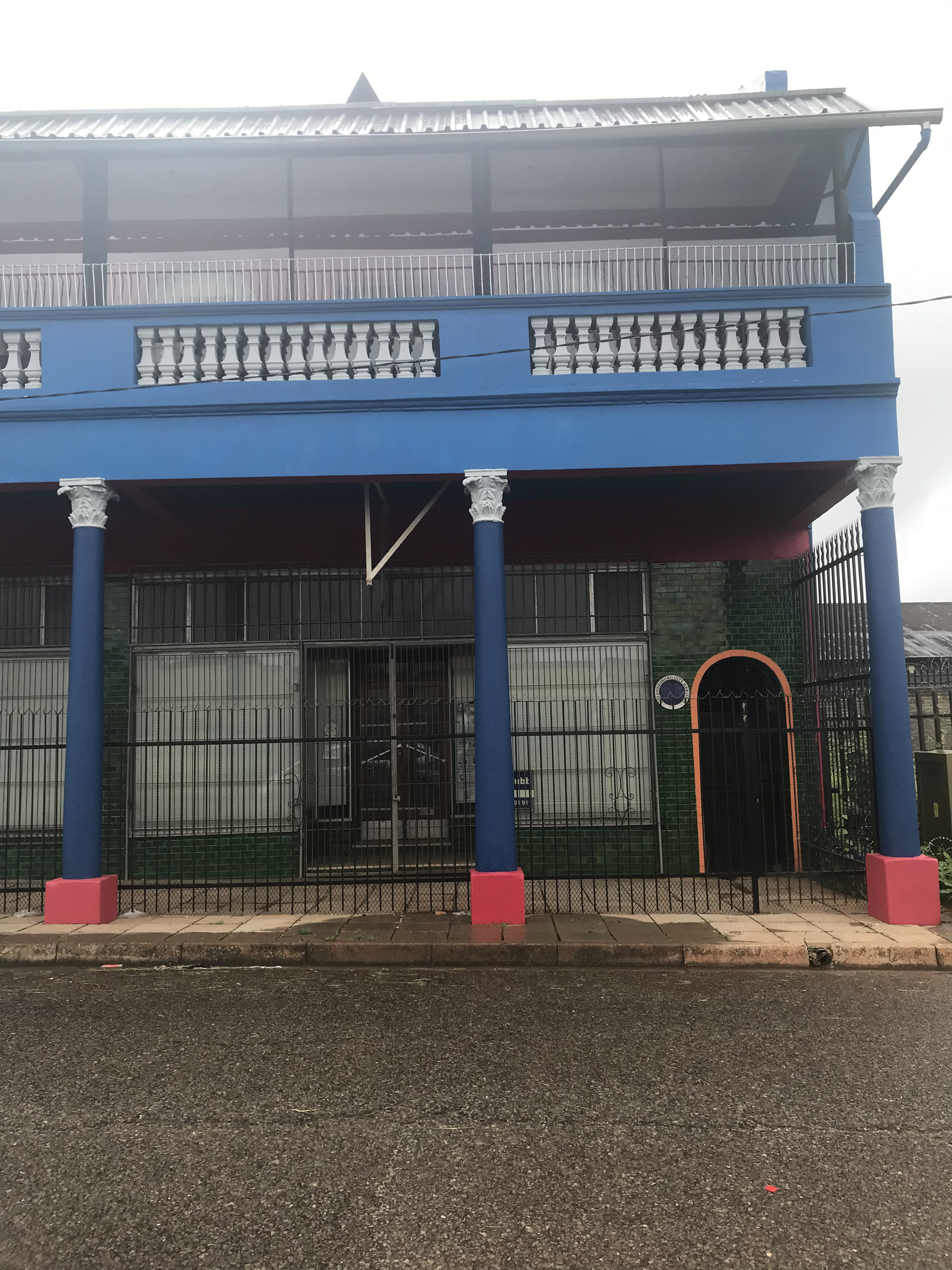
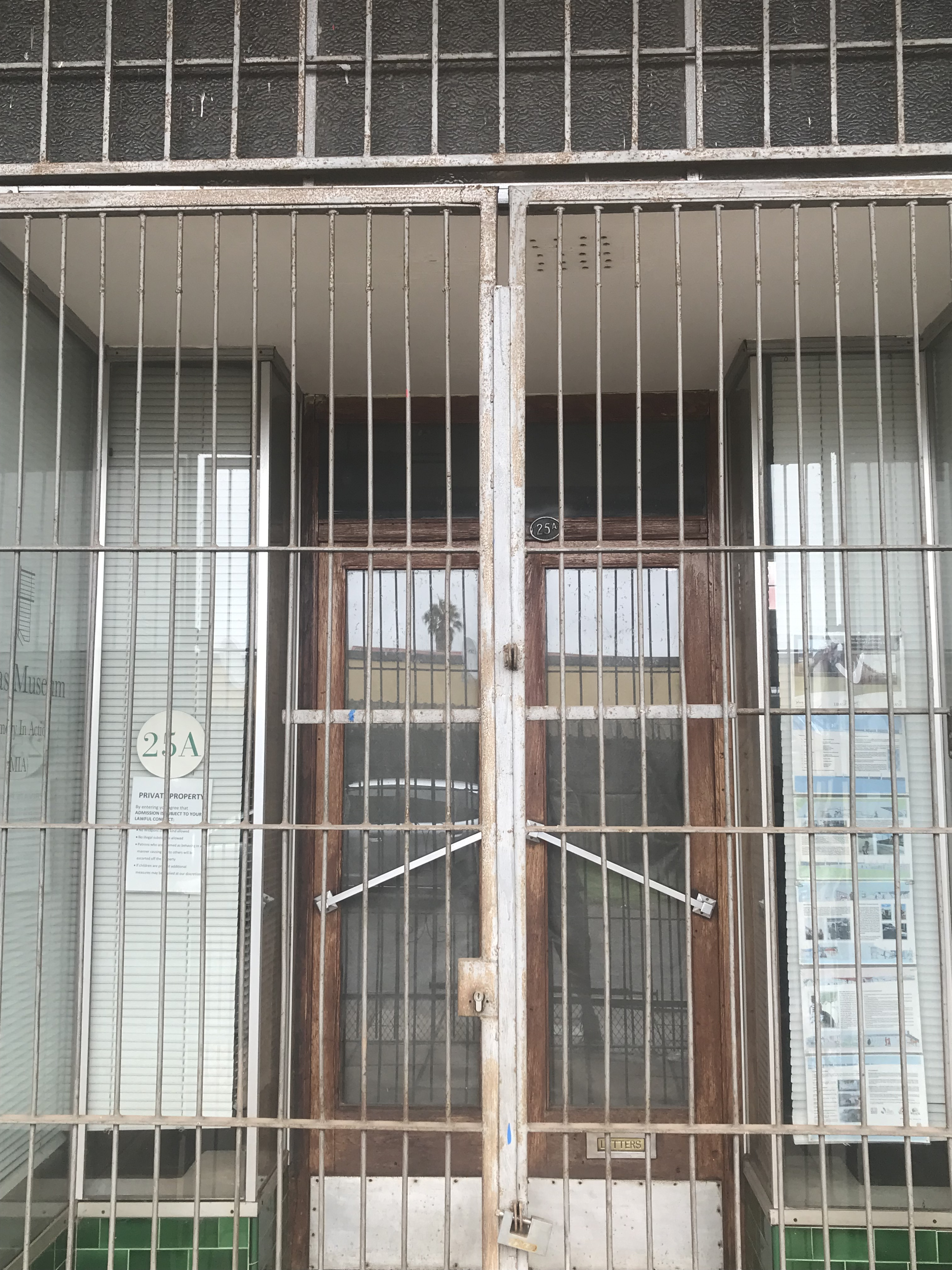
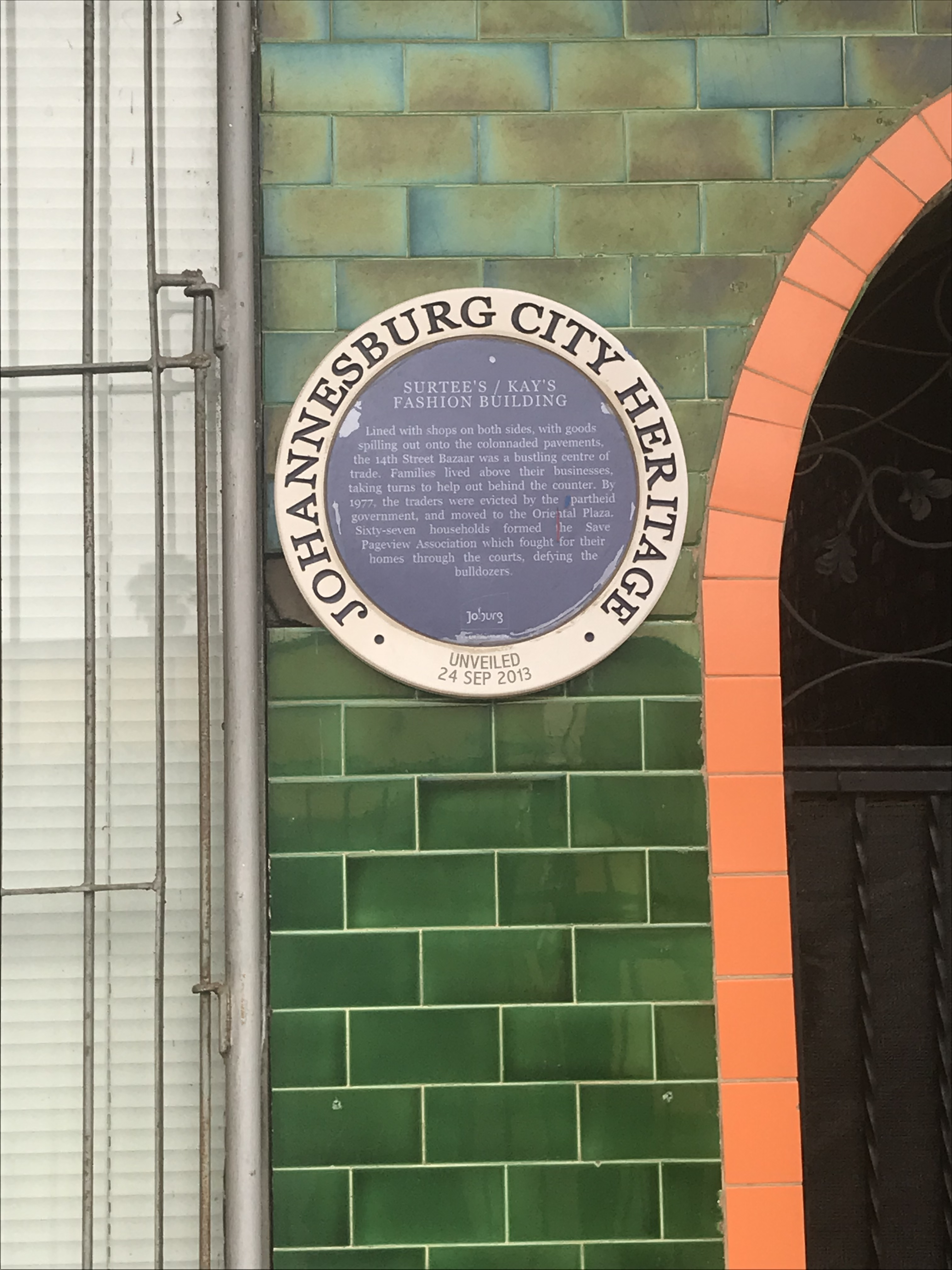
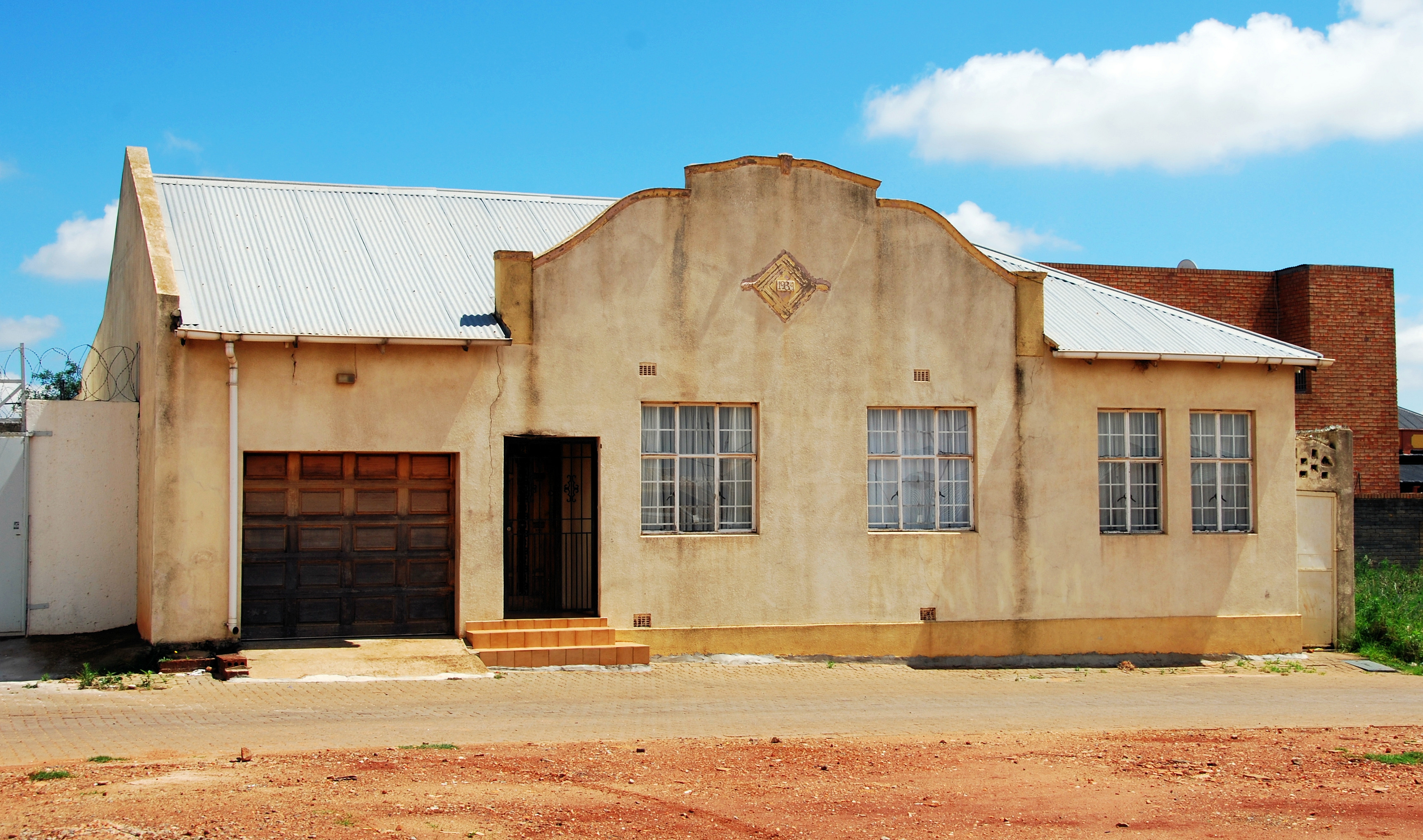
- A double-story building is all that remains of the once bustling 14th Street precinct. Fietas Museum - keeping the memory alive Surtee's / Kay's Fashion Building Blue Plaque An old house in Pageview An endangered heritage - Pageview

- Location within Gauteng Location within South Africa
- Coordinates: 26.198°S 28.017°E
- Country: South Africa
- Province: Gauteng
- Municipality: City of Johannesburg
- Main Place: Johannesburg

Area
  - Total: 0.17 km^{2} (0.066 sq mi)

Population (2011)
  - Total: 947
  - Density: 5,600/km^{2} (14,000/sq mi)

Racial makeup (2011)
  - Indian/Asian: 41.1%
  - Black African: 29.4%
  - White: 14.8%
  - Coloured: 11.1%
  - Other: 3.7%

First languages (2011)
  - English: 42.1%
  - Afrikaans: 27.0%
  - Zulu: 4.1%
  - Northern Sotho: 3.1%
  - Other: 23.7%
- Time zone: UTC+2 (SAST)
- Postal code (street): 2092

Pageview is a suburb of Johannesburg, South Africa. It is located in Region F of the City of Johannesburg Metropolitan Municipality. Populated by non-whites, predominantly Indians, until the 1970s, it was one of two adjacent suburbs (Pageview, and the portion of Vrededorp south of 11th Street populated by non-whites) commonly known as Fietas. Much like District Six or the Magazine Barracks, Fietas developed its own character, which focussed around Fourteenth Street.

== History ==
In 1894, the land that would eventually become Pageview, was allocated by the South African Republic for Cape Coloureds (including Malays) and it became populated by Cape Malays. It was known as the Malay Camp (later Malay Location) with 279 stands. Coloureds had managed to obtain some concessions from the Boer government of Paul Kruger, possibly because they shared the Afrikaans language. Indians lived in the Coolie location, a slum west of the city, that was burned for sanitary reasons after an outbreak of bubonic plague in 1904. Most of the displaced Indians moved into the Malay Location, and by the 1940s it was mostly inhabited by Indian South Africans. On 27 January 1942, the Malay Location Standholders and Traders Association requested the name of the township be changed to Pageview after Johannesburg Mayor J.J Page. The town was renamed on 23 February 1943 and the council asked the government to give the Indian land owners ownership of their land. Pageview, (Fietas) was an area where those of Indian descent could lease land and trade. The declaration of forced removal under the Group Areas Act of 1950 brought decades of resistance but the eventual destruction of Fietas and the subsequent failed attempt to install a white community in its place.

In 1948, the National Party won the election and would soon introduce Apartheid. The area would be declared a white area which meant the eviction of all non-white residents, with black residents going to Soweto and Indian residents to Lenasia with evictions continuing from 1964 to 1970. Many homes were bulldozed, and housing for white people was built on some of the land, with large parts remaining undeveloped. This heritage is now commemorated at the Fietas Museum, (seemingly closed) by Salma Patel.

Fietas has five other blue plaques and one is at the home of Adam Asvat, a renowned community activist who with 6 families stood their ground against apartheid relocation. Others were at the Malay Mosque in 23rd Street, and St Anthony's Church in Krause Street.

The Oriental Plaza, a shopping centre, was built by the Johannesburg City Council in 1974 to compensate the traders who were affected by forced removals. The shopping centre remained empty until 1976 when traders are forcibly removed from their 14th street shops.

In 2016, the suburb of Pageview received a most endangered status nomination because of unresolved land restitution claims, legal and illegal demolitions, occupations etc.
