= Van Tilburg Collection =

The Van Tilburg Collection
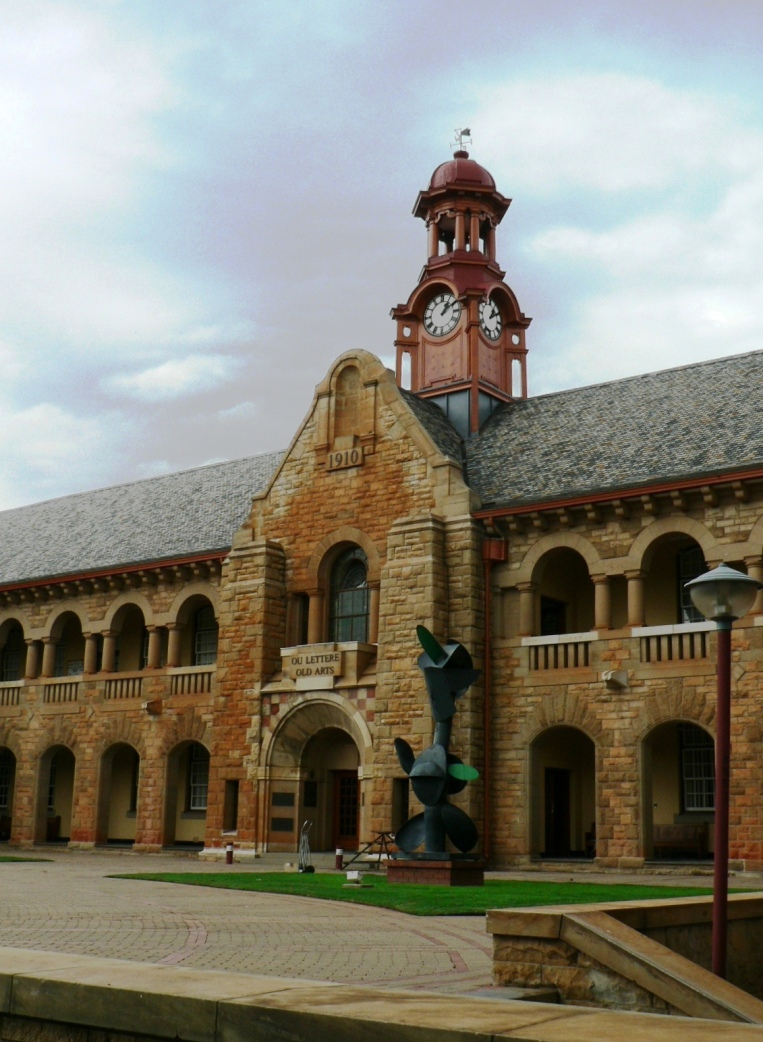
- The Old Arts building houses the museum
- Location: Pretoria, South Africa
- Type: Art museum

The Van Tilburg Collection is an art collection at the University of Pretoria that comprises 17th and 18th century furniture, paintings, Delft ceramics and other works of art, and includes the largest South African collection of Chinese ceramic objects. The oriental ceramic collection comprises 1699 pieces of earthenware, stoneware and porcelain dating from about 2000 BC until the early twentieth century.

J.A. Van Tilburg bequeathed his collection of Eastern and European ceramics, furniture, paintings, graphic works, carpets and metal ware to the University of Pretoria on 19 November 1976. This collection includes Chinese ceramics dating from 2000 BC, furniture dating from 1100 AC, several European paintings and vases from the Kangxi Emperor's personal collection.

Examples of Chinese ceramics from the Qin (221-206 BC), Han (202 BC – AD 220), Tang (AD 618-906), Song (AD 960-1279), Ming (1368-1644) and Qing (1644-1912) dynasties can be seen in this collection. There are also examples of Japanese Arita and Imari porcelain and Annamese (Vietnamese) ceramics, as well as 63 examples of early Delft earthenware. It includes plates, garnitures and flowerpots. In addition, there are three panels with 50 17th-century Delft tiles.

Among the older pieces in the collection of Tang funerary wares there is a beige amphora with dragon handles, a typical polychrome figure of Ch'I-t'ou with an animal head and a 'three-colour' (green/brown/yellow) phoenix head pilgrim's flask. There are Tang lokapala tomb guardians of Fang-Hsiang standing on a reclining bull. These guardians are made partly in human and partly in animal form, and kept evil spirits away from the tombs of the dead. One of the Tang wares is a dark brown early pot, which was originally given to a Taoist monastery by Emperor Taizong of the Tang dynasty to commemorate his victory over the Eastern Turks in AD 630.

The Van Tilburg Collection contains a representative collection of Song wares: many Celadons, a few Ding wares, nine Cizhou wares and a few Junyao wares. Celadons are characterised by the semi-translucent green glaze, which varies in colour from a pale grey-green to a deep olive-green. Junyao wares are unmistakable due to their blue, purple and crimson colours. There are seven Junyao items in the collection.

This collection contains 550 pieces of Ming porcelain, of which 323 pieces are underglaze blue-and-white. There are 40 large Ming Swatow chargers and many smaller objects such as bowls, flasks, plates and cups. Examples of Chenghua (1465-1487), Hongzhi (1488-1505), Zhengde (1506-1521), Jiajing (1522-1566) and Wanli (1573-1619) wares are found in the Collection.

Noteworthy Kangxi (1662-1722) and Qianlong (1736-1795) pieces are the large blue-and-white porcelain chargers, the underglaze red pots and blue-and-white ritual stand with two side vases. There are numerous polychrome Kangxi 'Famille verte' and Qianlong 'Famille rose' plates in the collection. The collection holds a pair of 'Famille noire' pots which belonged to the Kangxi Emperor.

There are also a number of Imperial Japanese pieces in the collection, among them a blue-and-white Arita gendi with Arabian ormolu mouldings, an early 19th-century blue-and-white Arita charger decorated with a floral still life and pomegranates, a large blue-and-white vase decorated with priests and flowers, and many polychrome pieces of Japanese porcelain, such as a number of Imari tea sets and plates and a Kakeimon plate from about 1650 decorated with eight panels and a landscape.

The Van Tilburg Collection has many Swatow pots, bowls, plates and chargers representing all the different decoration styles.

There has been speculation that Van Tilburg's collection may have been plundered from Jewish families during World War II. There was a lot of negative publicity around the donation to the university and a court case in the Netherlands during the 1970s.
