= Jeppestown Reformed Church =

Church in Jeppestown, South Africa

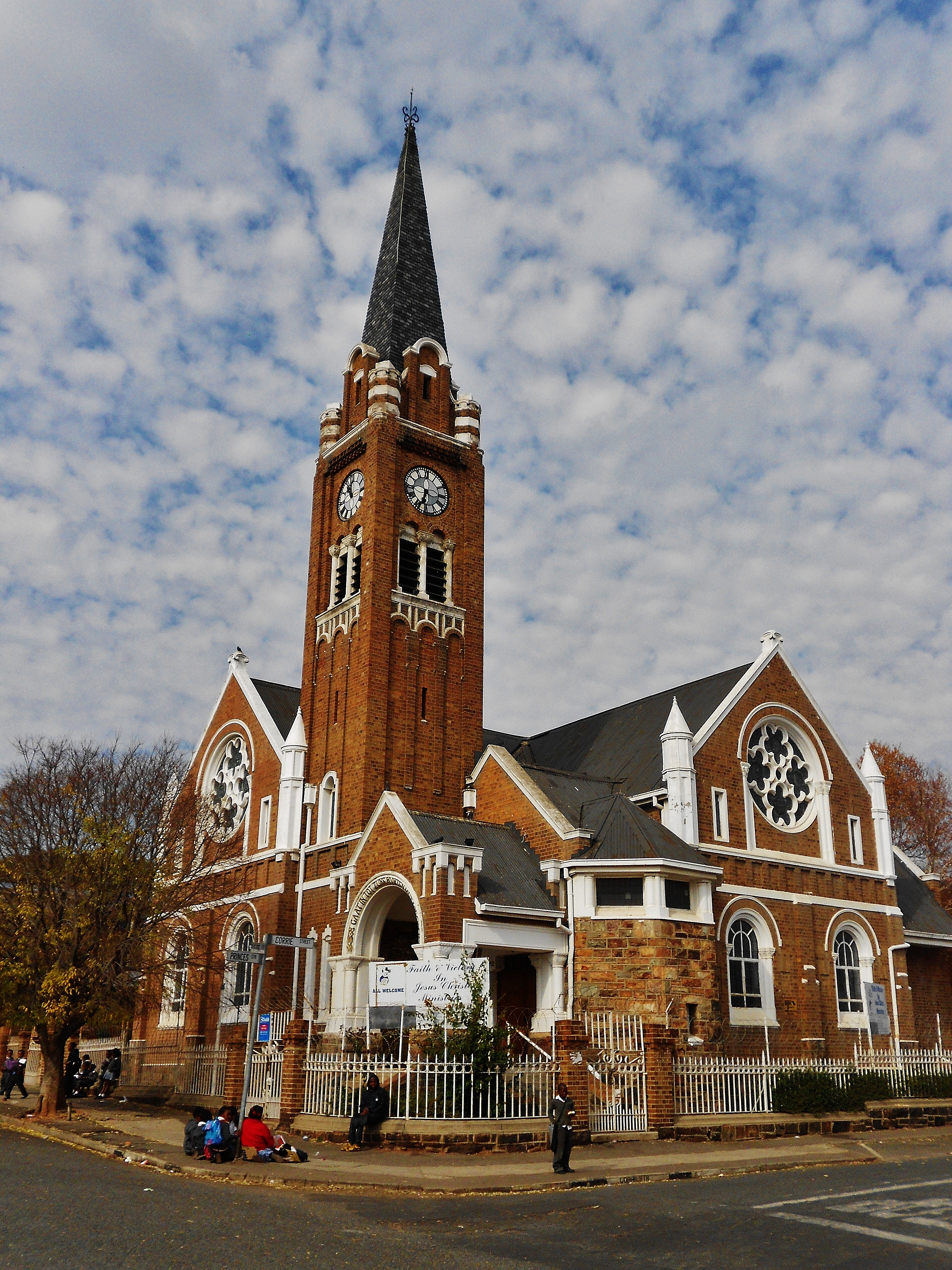

The Jeppestown Reformed Church was a congregation of the Dutch Reformed Church in the east of Johannesburg that separated from the mother congregation on Thursday, 8 July 1897, the same day as the Johannesburg East Reformed Church. It was partly (together with Johannesburg-East) the Turffontein Reformed Church (1906), from which all the congregations in the south of the city eventually directly or indirectly arose, and the mother congregation of all three congregations in the east of Johannesburg, namely Malvern, Bezuidenhout Valley and Belgravia. Jeppestown merged with Malvern on 1 November 1992 to form the congregation Kensington.

== Background ==
Due to the vastness of the Johannesburg Reformed Church and divisions in the mother congregation, the Heidelberg parish commission had to proceed to establish two daughter congregations in the eastern part of the existing congregation on the same day in 1897. In the west of the emerging city, where more Afrikaans speakers settled, congregations had already been established in 1892 (Langlaagte) and 1896 (Fordsburg). With the establishment of Jeppestown in the mother congregation's old church building on Von Brandisplein, Rev. Abraham Kriel, pastor of Langlaagte and later father of the orphanage that would eventually bear his name, was appointed as consultant. The boundaries of the congregation extended eastwards from the city centre, from End Street (seven blocks west of the present Ellispark) to the then boundaries of the Heidelberg and Boksburg congregations.

The very first congregational meeting was held on Monday 12 July 1897 in the school building of Mr. Fourie in Jeppestown under the leadership of Rev. Abraham Kriel of the NG congregation of Langlaagte. He informed the congregation that the congregation had been properly established on 8 July 1897 and that at a congregational meeting held on 9 July 1897 in the church building on Von Brandisplein the following brothers were elected to the church council of the new congregation, namely as elders the brothers J. Adendorff, Dr. Weich, A. van Heerden and F. Wolhuter, and as deacons the brothers P.R. Retief, J.N. Theron, Wm. Fourie, P.J. Zoutendyk, P. Mentz, J.S. Bam, P.W.J. de Klerk and G.J. Malherbe. The church council members were elected on Sunday 11 July 1897 in the church building on Von Brandisplein by Rev. Kriel were confirmed in their respective offices, except for Brother Adendorff who, due to ill health, could only be confirmed as an elder during the historic prayer meeting. Fourie, the teacher in whose school building the first services and church council meetings took place, was still alive at the time the congregation celebrated its fiftieth anniversary, although he was already very old.

One of the first matters to which the church council had to give its attention was to find a suitable venue for holding services and prayer times. The school building of Brother Fourie, in which outside services had been held since 1895, had meanwhile become much too cramped for this purpose. At its first meeting the church council therefore appointed a commission to look for a suitable church site and to find out the terms and conditions on which it could be rented. During the first months the church council met mostly in the house of Elder Adendorff, but sometimes also in the school building. In the absence of the consultant, the chair of chairmanship was usually taken by Brother Adendorff because he was the oldest church council member.

== Ministers ==
- Paul Nel, 1898–1907 (later moderator of the Transvaal Church)
- Johannes Francois Botha, 1908–1912
- Louis Johannes Fourie, 1913–1921, (afterwards Dutch Reformed Church, Middleburg)
- Petrus Albertus Roux, 1921–1937 (emeritus; died on 4 October 1939)
- Gerrit Conradie le Roux, 1937–1938 (assistant pastor from 1933)
- Jacobus Johannes Odendaal, 1938–1943 (afterwards first pastor of Johannesburg-North)
- Hercules Alexander Sandenbergh, 1939–1940
- Dr. Hendrik Ludolph Neethling Joubert, 1941–1944 (later first pastor of daughter congregation Bezuidenhoutsvallei)
- Gerrit Etienne Bruwer, 1943–1946
- Carl Petrus van der Merwe, 1944–1958
- Dr. Frederik Johannes Minnaar, 1946–1948
- Marthinus Stephanus Joubert, 1948–1950
- Louis Lawrence Nel Botha, 1958–1960
- Sarel Petrus du Plessis, 1961–1963
- Dr Badenhorst 1964–1967
- Andries Johannes Jacobus van Tonder, 1968–1973
- Dietrich Berner, 1973–1978 (transferred from Triomf where he was the first pastor)
- Hendrik Jacobus Steyn, 17 January 1981 – 31 July 1988 (when he retired)
