= Johannesburg Reformed Church (NGK) =

Church in Johannesburg, South Africa

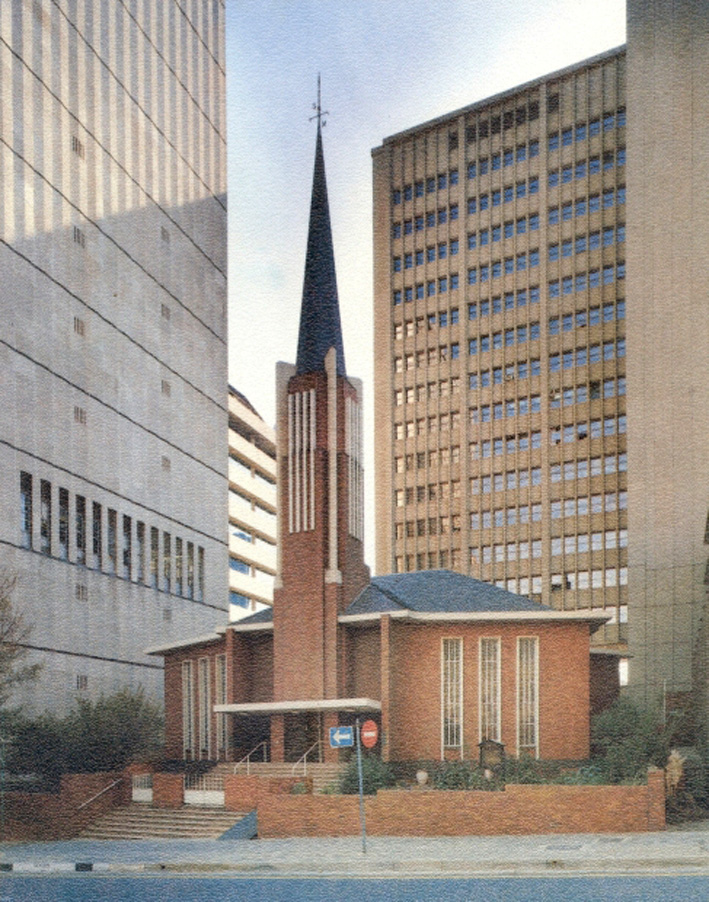

The Johannesburg Reformed Church was the first congregation of the Dutch Reformed Church in South Africa (NGK) to be founded in Johannesburg on August 14, 1887. All the congregations on the Witwatersrand stem from it, but by the 2010s, the NGK yearbook recorded only 90 in its ward which had long ceased to operate independently.

== Background to congregation foundation ==
The city was part of the area served by the Heidelberg Reformed Church (NGK) until it got its own congregation. Landowners had been leaving the Cape Colony for the Highveld since around 1840 to escape British rule. Building on the efforts of the Rev. Abraham Kriel of the Du Toit’s Pan Reformed Church, his curate, proponent J.N. Martins, began preaching full-time on the Rand.

The gold rush brought people from all over the world to the area. As far as can be determined, the Rev. Stephanus Jacobus du Toit, the Superintendent of Education of the South African Republic, led the first NGK service in Johannesburg. At the open-air service, held on a Sunday in mid-1886 in the shadow of a willow tree near where the later Langlaagte Reformed Church and Abraham Kriel Orphanage would later stand. Rev. Du Toit sermonized on Genesis 2:12, “and the gold of that land is good.”

The NGK contingent among the new settlers of the Rand largely settled in the western portion of what is now downtown, in what was then known as the “Dip.” This included the poorer neighborhoods of Langlaagte, Fordsburg, and Vrededorp, the only portions of the area then that were majority-Afrikaner. The wealthier northern (Parktown, Houghton) and northeastern (Observatory, Orange Grove) neighborhoods were almost exclusively English. Upwardly mobile Afrikaners later settled in large numbers in the northwestern areas such as Melville, Westdene, Auckland Park, Northcliff, Linden, and Randburg, among others. To a lesser extent than in the “Dip,” Afrikaners also settled in the area of Jeppestown, just east of downtown. Consequently, while 14 NGK congregations sprang up in the 8 km west of city hall, 5 were founded to the east.

== Foundation ==
The church council of Du Toit’s Pan, chaired by Rev. Kriel, assigned its curate, proponent J.N. Martins, in their words, to “preach the gospel to our brothers in the goldfields as well.” Martins came to Johannesburg on May 17, 1887. At first he preached from a “cane stall”. On August 14, 1887 the congregation opened with the first church there made from wood and corrugated galvanised iron. At first there in a temporary capacity, Martins was proclaimed local pastor on November 21 and officially invested as such in May 1888.

The 1952 retrospective Ons gemeentelike feesalbum writes the following:

The congregation never, in fact, had the chance to grow peacefully. More than the pastor of any other congregation, Rev. Martins had to contend with every struggle the people and Church endured over the past three-quarters of a century, and he was constantly exposed to the dangers posed by the instability of a fast-growing, cosmopolitan community. Case in point, only three years after the 1887 construction of the first church, a larger one on the same Von Brandis Square was needed.

Von Brandis Square was initially known as Church Square after the construction of the first building. Later, around 1997, it was renamed Government Square after the government bought the second church, subsequently renamed again in honor of Carl von Brandis, first magistrate of Johannesburg. Farmers and prospectors camped on the rest of the square, which later became home to the city’s first synagogue. Opposite the NGK church laid a row of stores, including the Hunt brothers’ bicycle shop, now the Williams Hunt & Co. bicycle shop. The mining camp’s first school was also alongside the church. The church served many purposes over its lifetime, including as a bakery, a lecture hall, an election polling place, and the office of the Rand Aids Association. Johannesburgers protested the government’s decision to raze the buildings and replace them with a courthouse, which nevertheless took place in 1909. The South Gauteng High Court continues to operate today where the NGK’s first church in Johannesburg once stood.

The second church ceased to be the center of the congregation once the Johannesburg East Reformed Church (NGK) and the Jeppestown Reformed Church seceded on July 8, 1897, whence a temporary church, once again a wood and corrugated galvanised iron structure, was built on Jorissen Street in Braamfontein. The Second Boer War delayed construction of a more permanent church, the fourth and penultimate, which opened on April 13, 1904. Ons gemeente feesalbum reported in 1952 that “this building is due to be demolished soon so that the congregation can open the fifth church in its short history in 1953. So is Johannesburg!” The demolition of the fourth church in the 1950s left the brick Jeppestown church as the oldest NGK church still standing in the city.

The Rev. Martins served the congregation until his retirement in 1920. By 1952, there were already 25 congregations derived from the mother church, a number that reached a high of 47 in 1973 spun off in some way from Johannesburg and organized into five sub-synods or Rings (Johannesburg, Langlaagte, Turffontein, Linden, and Melville). By 2010, these had shrunk to just 21 with the absorption or merger of, by date of original secession, the Langlaagte (1892), Fordsburg (1896), Jeppestown (1897), Johannesburg East (1897), Turffontein (originally La Rochelle, 1906), Cottesloe (earlier Vrededorp, 1927), Rosettenville (1938), Brixton (1939), Malvern (1940), Johannesburg North (1942), Bezuidenhout Valley (1944), Johannesburg West (1944), Parkhurst (1944), Crosby West (originally Hurst Hill, 1949), South Rand (1950), Johannesburg South (1950), Belgravia (1952), Mayfair (1953), Auckland Park (1958), Northeast Rand (1959), Sterrewag (1964), and Andrew Murray (1966). These had been merged into Deo Gloria, Parkkruin (formerly Parksig and first absorbing Parkhurst), Vergesig, Kensington, and a reformed Johannesburg North-Andrew Murray, along with the one completely new congregation active today, Weltevreden.

Ons gemeente feesalbum continues: “the 1886 mining camp became the largest city in South Africa, where roaring crowds jostle every day between tall buildings on crowded streets that cannot handle all the traffic, but high among the cliff-like apartment and office buildings stands the Johannesburg, as if to say, ‘Man – he is like grass, but the Word of God is eternal.’”

== The Rev. and Mrs. Coetzee’s arrival ==
On Friday, February 10, 1934, a motorcade of sixteen met the Rev. and Mrs. P.S.Z. Coetzee in Baragwanath on the highway from Potchefstroom. After singing Psalm 146:1 and an exchange of warm handshakes among attendees, the procession continued on to the parsonage, where several congregation members serenaded him with the hymn "Dat 's Heren zegen op u daal" (“The Lord’s blessing be upon you,” from Psalm 134:3). That night, around 600 occupied Eendrag Hall. Among the guests of honor who accompanied the new pastor and his wife from Free State were his mother as well as his father-in-law, Rev. Jacob Rabie of the Zastron Reformed Church (NGK). The function served both to welcome the new pastor’s family and to say goodbye to Rev. Roode, who had served the congregation during the preceding vacancy.

Several speeches were given by visiting pastors, and for the Saturday evening solemn investiture itself, no less than seventeen ministers and missionaries wished the new pastor the Lord’s blessing with a warm handshake. Among them were the consulent, Rev. S.W. van Niekerk from Ringsweë, Rev. D.P. Cillié formerly of Johannesburg but now of Harrismith, and Rev. T.C. Esterhuizen, who managed the missionary program among the Cape Coloureds. The Rev. Coetzee’s inaugural Sunday morning sermon drew from the Apostles, namely the passage “for I decided to know nothing among you except Jesus Christ, and him crucified” from 1 Corinthians 2:2.

== Life in the booming congregation ==
The Rev. and Mrs. Coetzee’s labor as the pastoral couple yielded, in the words of the Rev. A.P. Smit, “unmistakable signs of a blessed flourishing in congregation life.” Attendance at services spiked to the point where another gallery needed to be added to the church building. Especially on Sunday evenings, pews could be hard to come by. The 1935 and 1936 Ring reports considered Johannesburg proper the top collections recipient there and reported worshiper satisfaction with both the sermons and the pastor’s visitations. The September 14, 1937 council meeting notes report on the “friendly cooperation between church council members” and the council’s high approval of the Rev. and Mrs. Coetzee’s work. At that same council meeting, just after the congregation’s 50th Anniversary Jubilee, brothers P.J. van Gass and H.J. Storm proposed a unanimously approved motion starting “that the church council with great pleasure and appreciation recognizes the great and divine work done [Rev. Coetzee] has done and wish he and his [second] wife the strength and grace to continue for a long time giving Him glory and uplifting our people.”

A year later, in the August 1938 notes, the council thanked him once again “for his commitment to repairing the church and the lights [of the church],” in reference to renovations done that year. Herbert Evans was the contractor for the interior renovation, but Mr. F.P. Viljoen was hired by the council “to upgrade the church lights”; the funds came from a donation to the council by the late Dr. F.P. Fouche “in memory of the late Mrs. Fouche.” The acoustics, despite several past improvements, still left much to be desired however.

== Debt paid off ==
Surging collections not only paid off the debt entirely but also kept the congregation consistently solvent. In the late 1930s, the Great Depression began to ease, and Rev. Coetzee took steps to boost revenue by replacing old mail fundraising with annual Thanksgiving mailing lists, though monthly donations were still expected.

Ward sales were upgraded to large central ones for the whole congregations as well. Already in February 1935, a year into Rev. Coetzee’s tenure, the financial committee revealed the clearing of congregation debt – a longtime goal of Rev. Cillié. That May, the council notes carried word from the Sisters’ Circle that “since the Sister’s Circle was founded to resolve the congregation’s financial problems and the church council has confirmed the full payment of debts, its members declare it dissolved,” to which the council thanked them for their work “in dark days” of the early Depression years.

== Publication of the Afrikaans Bible ==
Although the four NGK Synods proclaimed Afrikaans the official church language in 1919, and the Transvaal Synod followed the example of the Free State one in approving Afrikaans Bible translation that May, it took 14 years for a full rendering to be published. On May 29, 1933, the first edition of 10,000 Afrikaans Bibles arrived at Cape Town on the MV Carnarvon Castle. Ceremonies were held to welcome copies throughout the country. For example, the Transvaal Teachers’ Association invited “a large number of members, pastors, and other dignitaries to welcome the arrival of the Afrikaans Bible” at Rusoord School in Johannesburg. On Sunday, August 27, of the same year, NGK and Reformed Churches of South Africa (GKSA) congregations throughout South Africa held “Bible Festivals” to celebrate the tomes arriving. A large central one was held in Johannesburg, run by a committee of two representatives during the vacancy between Rev. Cillié’s death and Rev. Coetzee’s arrival. Henceforward, all preaching from the Braamfontein pulpit would be in Afrikaans.

== The congregation monthly ==
A highlight of Rev. Coetzee’s time was the foundation of the congregation’s own monthly newsletter. 30 years before Rev. Coetzee’s time, Rev. Martins had started the Witwatersrand Kerk- en Skoolblad, but this was more of a Ring paper active from 1905 to 1906. In January 1923, Rev. William Nicol of Johannesburg East started a popular newsletter in his congregation, the Irenenuus, leading Rev. Cillié to suggest “writing a leaflet to be published monthly for the congregation to read” at the March 1931 meeting. Perhaps due to the pastor’s subsequent illness, this suggestion was never implemented, but Rev. Coetzee took up the issue upon arrival.

In December 1934, the council decided to begin publication, and so Rev. Coetzee began editing and publishing Die Fakkel with its first edition in March 1935, assisted by two teachers from the Helmpekaar Kollege. According to council minutes at the time, it was first printed by a J.C. Fick and later by the publishers of Die Vaderland. The paper was active for two and a half years, releasing its last edition in August 1937. The council opted to suspend publication then and instead order 750 copies a month of the new monthly of the Transvaal Synod, which appeared regularly under the title of Die Voorligter (later LIG) that December, as per the June 1937 council meeting notes.

== The 50th Anniversary Celebration ==
In September 1936, elder J. Joubert reminded the council of its pending semi-centennial year, upon which Rev. Coetzee founded and chaired a celebration commission including Joubert, W.P. Jacobs, C.D. Wentzel, J.A. Muller, P.J. van Gass, J.H. Nel, and T.A. Hugo, later joined by Rev. T.C. Esterhuizen. By the beginning of August 1937, Rev. Coetzee reported to the council on behalf of the committee:

That the 50th anniversary celebration of the congregation is hereby scheduled for August 28–29; the main service will be led by the local pastor and soon an invitation will be issued in the Kerkbode to former congregation members. A smaller committee of Revs. Coetzee and Esterhuizen and Mr. Van Heerden of Die Vaderland has been tasked with writing up short pamphlets on the congregation, including a portrait of the serving council, to be issued to attendees and published in Die Vaderland to advertise the occasion.

The proceedings began on the evening of Wednesday, August 25, with Rev. Coetzee’s opening sermon, and several visiting pastors spoke that weekend. The 15-page pamphlet summarizing the congregation’s history was entitled Vyftigjarige Fees van die Braamfonteinse Gemeente (“Fiftieth Anniversary Celebration of the Braamfontein Congregation”), preceded by an August 24 article in Die Vaderland. The congregation then included 2,500 people, of whom 1,580 were confirmed members. Forty teachers taught 500 children in the five Sunday schools. The church council had expanded to 33.

Rev. Smit writes:

This congregation grew remarkably since its foundation half a century ago. Not to say the NGK on the Rand in general has not also grown over the same time. In 1887, several hundred worshipers formed the only congregation of our church on the Rand. Fifty years later, there were no less than twenty-two congregations stretching from Springs to Randfontein, including 62,000 members! [From 1937-1947] our Church on the Rand would continue to advance in various ways.

=== Curates in Johannesburg ===
The Rev. Coetzee saw the need for curates to help minister to the burgeoning congregation as soon as he arrived, and the council thus hired a proponent named Botha in August 1935 to serve as such. He left that November, however, and in August 1936, Rev. Coetzee implored them to try again in the knowledge, as per the council meeting notes that month, “that his work for the congregation was suffering for being spread too thin.” The council’s next proponent, Martin Kruger, was ordained as permanent curate at the end of 1937. After almost two years serving the congregation, Kruger married and left for the Westdene Reformed Church at the end of June 1938, going on to serve the Graaff-Reinet Reformed Church (NGK), Linden Reformed Church (NGK), and Ontdekkers Reformed Church (NGK).

== First student pastor ==
After the departure of Rev. Gert Meij (1939-1940), the council postponed searching for another co-pastor. The April 1940 Transvaal Synod Conference, however, began an effort to hire two student pastors for the area, one for Pretoria and Heidelberg and the other for Johannesburg and Potchefstroom, both of whom would be dignified as full co-pastors of the congregations concentrating on ministry to students. The council first interviewed Rev. Ben Marais on the Transvaal staff, but he opted to serve at Pretoria East, leading the council to hire the young pastor of Vrededorp (later Cottesloe), the Rev. Johan Bezuidenhoud, as co-pastor for students in Johannesburg and Potchefstroom. The Rev. Coetzee invested Rev. Bezuidenhoud on Saturday, March 15, 1941 in the Braamfontein church, as Rev. G.D. Worst of the Potchefstroom Reformed Church (NGK) gave the investiture speech. In May 1943, Rev. Bezuidenhoud moved on to the Steynsburg Reformed Church (NGK).

== The Rev. Coetzee leaves for Edenburg ==
After eleven years serving Johannesburg, Rev. Coetzee returned to work in his hometown congregation, the Edenburg Reformed Church. His health could no longer handle the urban demands, prompting the change to lighten his workload. The Reverend and his wife were bid farewell at a warm ceremony in the Selborne hall on April 5, 1945.

== Diamond jubilee ==
The congregation celebrated its 60th anniversary during the last weekend of September 1947 with a wreath-laying at the graves of Revs. Martins (who had died September 14, 1938) and Cillié (died October 30, 1935). The Rev. Martins’ widow also attended, and would die soon after in July 1948, at her home on Richmond Avenue, Auckland Park. By the year of the jubilee, the congregation numbered 4,000 including 2,830 confirmed members served by three full-time pastors, 83 council members, 48 deacons, and 32 teachers serving 350 students in three Sunday schools.

== Two marriages and a divorce ==
Post-apartheid migration after 1990 drained the Afrikaner population from downtown and surrounding neighborhoods (some of which had long been deemed multiracial “grey areas”). The congregation thus shrunk to 110 in 1994, leading to a merger with the Auckland Park congregation on Thursday, June 1, 1995, after which both the latter’s church on 71 Richmond Avenue and the mother church on 117 De Korte Street in Braamfontein continued to be used for services. That August, plans were already laid to merge with Johannesburg East (whose church in Doornfontein was known as the Irene Church), which came to fruition on Sunday, June 1, 1997 as an expanded Johannesburg congregation stretching from Auckland Park to Braamfontein, Berea, and Hillbrow. The headquarters was moved to Auckland Park, with services continuing to be held in Braamfontein and the Irene Church.

The resulting congregation had four pastors: Rev. Johan Krige (student pastor of Auckland Park since January 8, 1982, later CEO of MES), Rev. Christoph Müller (suburbs), and Revs. Attie Botha and Piet Smith (downtown). The congregation stretched from Ellis Park in the east to Rand Afrikaans University (now the University of Johannesburg) in the west, and Revs. Botha and Smith ministered to many non-members downtown.

Although the Melville Reformed Church approached Auckland Park about mergers (Melville’s membership was just 340 in 1994), Melville and the Braamfontein/Irene portions of the district did not come to an agreement. The constituent parts of the Johannesburg congregation split when, around 2000, the Auckland Park church sold the Kingway buildings to a gas station developer, leading the area to split to join Melville as the Melville Cross Reformed Church, worshiping from the Melville church on 51 4th Avenue.

== Historiography ==
Over the years, several books and other publications have been written about the history of the congregation. The first was the 20th anniversary publication from 1907 known as Ned. Herv. of Geref. Gemeente Johannesburg, Twintig Jarigfeest, 14 Aug. 1887 – 14 Aug. 1907. Eene beknopte geschiedenis van deze Gemeente onder Gods trouwe leiding gedurende den tijd van 20 jaren (“NGK Johannesburg Congregation, Twentieth Anniversary, August 14, 1887 – August 14, 1907: A brief history of this Church under God’s faithful guidance during a period of 20 years.”) The 12-page pamphlet (with two columns a page) is in the church archives in Pretoria and celebrates the congregation’s recovery after the Second Boer War. 30 years later came the 15-page, again double-columned Brosjure ter herdenking van die 50-jarige bestaan van die Ned. Herv. of Geref. Gemeente Braamfontein (“Brochure in honor of the 50 years of the Braamfontein NGK Congregation”). The 508-page Ons kerk in due Goudstad (1887-1947) by Rev. Smit was written in conjunction with the church councils of Johannesburg, Fordsburg, Johannesburg East, and Jeppestown in 1948 to celebrate the denomination’s 60th anniversary in town. Finally, Rev. Bezuidenhout’s festival committee published a 31-page festival brochure in 1962 for the 75th anniversary.

== Location ==
The church was located on 117 De Korte Street in Braamfontein, next to the old Highveld Synod headquarters.

== Select pastors ==
1. Johannes Nieuwoudt Martins, 1887–1920 (arrived May 17, 1887, became pastor on November 25, 1887, ordained in May 1888, retired in 1920, his only congregation).
2. Herman Christian Johannes Becker, 1890 (curate)
3. Willem Siebert Edward Rörich, 1894–1897 (Kompounds)
4. Pieter Gerhardus Jacobus Meiring, 1895–1897 (later first pastor of Johannesburg East)
5. David Petrus Cillié, 1920–1926 and 1929–1933
6. Dr. Franciscus Dionysius (Dio) Moorrees, August 1927 – 1928 (barely 10 months)
7. Petrus Stefanus Zacharius Coetzee, 1934–1945
8. Harold Christian Botha, 1936–1942 (curate)
9. Gert Olivier Meij, 1939–1940
10. Johan Gregorius Bezuidenhoud, 1941–1943
11. Jacob Stolp Louw, 1944–1949 (originally student pastor but co-pastor from the end of 1946 on)
12. Cornelis Bertie Brink, 1945–1959, actuary and later moderator of the Transvaal Synod of 1951–1957
13. David Stefanus Snyman, 1947–1953 (third co-pastor assigned to RAU students)
14. Johannes Alexander van Wyk, 1950–1952 (student pastor)
15. Cornelis Johannes Hattingh, 1954–1955
16. Johan Andries Lombard, 1955–1961
17. Marthinus Eduard Johannes Bezuidenhout, 1960–1962
18. Adriaan Cornelis Barnard, 1961–1967
19. Dr. Willie Jonker, 1962–1965
20. A.J. Venter, omstreeks 1963
21. Dr. John Henry Roberts, 1966–1970 (professor of New Testatment studies at UNISA)
22. Marthinus Theunis Steyn Fourie, July 26, 1969 – 1973
23. Talbot Horatio Nelson Sadler, 1969–1975
24. Gerhardus Willem Painter, April 17, 1970 – September 5, 1993 (retirement)
25. Neille van Aswegen, 1973–1976
26. Michiel Christoffel Roux, 1980–1984
27. Congregation vacant from 1993 until the merger with Auckland Park in 1995.
28. Christoph Thomas Müller, 1995–2004 (earlier with Auckland Park, left in 2004 for Groenkloof, Pretoria)
29. Pieter (Piet) Ernst Scholtz Smith, 1995–2008 (earlier with Auckland Park, continued with Melville)
30. Johan Stefanus Krige, 1995–2000 (came from Auckland Park, continues as CEO of MES)
31. Arthur Daniel (Attie) Botha, 1997–2001

== Sources ==
- Brown, Dr. E. 1973. Gemeentegeskiedskrywing van die Afrikaanse kerke van gereformeerde belydenis – 'n kompilasie en kerk-historiese oorsig. Durban: Die skrywer.
- "Ds. Botha afgedank." Rapport. May 13, 2001.
- Gaum, Dr. Frits (ed.) et al. Jaarboek van die Nederduitse Gereformeerde Kerke. Pretoria/Cape Town/Wellington: Tydskriftemaatskappy van die Nederduitse Gereformeerde Kerk.
- "Gemeente neem afskeid van Braamfonteinkerk." Beeld. March 19, 1997.
- Olivier, Rev. P.L. (1952). Ons gemeentelike feesalbum. Cape Town/Pretoria: N.G. Kerk-uitgewers.
- Smit, Rev. A.P. (1948) Ons Kerk in die Goudstad (1887–1947). Cape Town: Church Councils of Johannesburg, Fordsburg, Johannesburg East, and Jeppestown.
- "Sprake van een gemeente vir middestad." Beeld. August 29, 1995.
- "Veiligheid by kerke." Rapport. August 27, 2000.
