= Linden Reformed Church =

Church merged; secession controversy detailed

The Linden Reformed Church was a congregation of the Dutch Reformed Church in South Africa (NGK) in the northwestern Johannesburg suburb of Linden. On July 1, 2018, it merged with the Aasvoëlkop Reformed Church to form the Aan die Berg Reformed Church.

== Secession controversy ==
In Ons gemeentelike feesalbum, a key source on the origin and history of hundreds of NGK congregations as far afield as Kenya and Tanzania, the secession is summarized as follows: “Linden separated from its mother church, Waterval Reformed Church at Waterval, on October 8, 1936 with 670 charter members and eight charter church councilors.” However, Rev. A.P. Smit recalled in Ons kerk in die Goudstad of an “unsavory” dispute between the Waterval and Johannesburg East councils over the secession arrangements.

At the November 27, 1927 Johannesburg East council meeting, the Waterval council sent out a brief proposing a Linden congregation and suggesting Johannesburg East release Emmarentia, Parkhurst (later home to the Parkhurst Reformed Church), and Craighall to be part of the Linden church's area. Johannesburg East's Rev. William Nicol founded a small committee that met with representatives of both congregations at a conference that December 5 in the Parkhurst church hall. During the meeting, the representatives both agreed to report back in favor of combining 610 members from Waterval and 240 from the aforementioned areas of Johannesburg East. The joint council meeting approved of the reconstitution, but most Parkhurst and Craighall members objected at local ward meetings, leading to Johannesburg East refusing permission.

Nevertheless, on October 8, 1936, the Ring (sub-Synod) Committee moved to found Linden with Emmarentia but not Parkhurst or Craighall. Dissatisfied with Emmarentia's secession, Rev. Nicol and the Johannesburg East Council complained to the Ring, but the petition failed and was appealed to the Synod, which appointed three arbiters to settle the matter, namely P.J. Viljoen, P. Swart, and J.H.R. Bartlett. Even they could not come to an agreement on where the wards of Greenside and Emmarentia should be assigned. The Johannesburg East council recommended the area be jointly served by Johannesburg, Johannesburg East, and Waterval, but Linden appealed this to the Synod, which ruled Emmarentia to be part of Linden.

== Linden's early history ==
On May 20, 1937, Rev. D.F.B. de Beer was invested as the congregation's first pastor. His first parsonage was built by 1938. The church was built from September 27 to December 6, 1941, and Rev. De Beer laid the cornerstone. The building, which cost £7,200, was inaugurated on May 3, 1942.

In June 1945, Rev. De Beer was appointed the Transvaal Secretary of Public Morals, and on August 13 of that year, Rev. M. Kruger of the Westdene Reformed Church was hired. He was invested shortly thereafter, and served for four years during the time that the Ferndale congregation seceded.

The Rev. Kruger left for a post in Graaff-Reinet in September 1949, and his successor Rev. G.J.J. Boshoff from Port Elizabeth West was invested on March 18, 1950. The congregation began building a new church in June 1951, for which Prime Minister of South Africa D. F. Malan laid the cornerstone on November 3, 1951. The inauguration was combined with the Founders Day or Jan van Riebeeck tri-centennial celebrations of April 6, 1952, and the building would be named in the explorer's honor.

Linden started out as one of the city's largest congregations, but it eventually begat daughter churches in Fairland, Fontainebleau, and Linden Park. Until Fairland and Fontainebleau seceded in 1955, the congregation included more than 1,700 worshipers served by 70 council members.

== Select pastors ==
- Daniel Ferdinand Bosman (Dan) de Beer, 1937 - 1945
- Maarten Kruger, 1945 - 1949
- Gideon Johannes Jacobus Boshoff, 1950 - 1961
- J. Bartlett, 1953 - 1960
- David Petrus Matthys Beukes, 1961 - 1962 (afterward Linden Park's first pastor after its secession)
- Jan Gabriël Griesel, 1962 - 1968
- Petrus Roelof van der Merwe, 1968 - 1977
- Dr. Attie van der Colf, August 13, 1977 - 1995 (poet, responsible for 126 hymns in the Liedboek van die Kerk)
- Johannes Jochemus Gildenhuys, 1998 - 2007
- Dr. Jan Daniël Theron, 2008 - 2018 (afterward co-pastor of Aan die Berg)

== Membership numbers ==
- 1973: baptized 283, confirmed 773
- 1979: baptized 258, confirmed 709
- 1985: baptized 173, confirmed 636
- 1994: baptized 164, confirmed 567
- 2006: baptized 117, confirmed 494
- 2007: baptized 110, confirmed 438
- 2010: baptized 89, confirmed 350
- 2013: baptized 45, confirmed 236

== Sources ==
- Olivier, ds. P.L. (compiler) (1952). Ons gemeentelike feesalbum. Cape Town/Pretoria: N.G. Kerk-uitgewers.
- Smit, ds. A.P. (1948). Ons Kerk in die Goudstad (1887 - 1947). Cape Town: Kerkrade van Johannesburg, Fordsburg, Johannesburg-Oos en Jeppestown.
- Symington, Johan (et al.) (1985 and beyond). Jaarboek van die NG Kerke. Cape Town/Wellington: Tydskriftemaatskappy.
