= Turffontein Reformed Church =

Dutch Reformed Church in South Africa

The Turffontein Reformed Church was a congregation of the Dutch Reformed Church in South Africa (NGK) in southern Johannesburg, Transvaal. It was founded in 1906 and for years had a large membership, at times exceeding 3,000.

88 years after its foundation and 44 years after that of the Johannesburg South Reformed Church (NGK), however, the two congregations would merge to form the Deo Gloria Reformed Church on April 24, 1994. This was due in part to the emigration of Afrikaners toward more affluent neighborhoods as well as the burning down of the neglected Turffontein Church, which the congregation could not afford to rebuild, in March 1992. The merger ended the oldest congregation in southern downtown Johannesburg, from which sprang all others in the area.

== Background ==
When the Johannesburg East Reformed Church (NGK) and the Jeppestown Reformed Church seceded from the oldest NGK church on the Rand, the Johannesburg Reformed Church (NGK), on July 8, 1897, Casey's Town (later known as Turffontein) became part of the Jeppestown congregation. Even before then, Johannesburg pastors Rev. J.N. Martins and Pieter Gerhardus Jacobus Meiring held services in a small meeting hall in Casey's Town. Serving the southern areas of Jeppestown proved especially challenging, since Rev. Paul Nel could only spare two Sundays a month to preach there. The Rev. Meiring (since then having moved to the Johannesburg East Reformed Church (NGK)) and Rev. Daniël Theron of the Fordsburg Reformed Church helped out at first, but had to be replaced by a missionary, brother MacLean, who himself remained there only a few months.

== Turffontein church hall ==
The Jeppestown congregation building committee, on the recommendation of the church council, decided in June 1903 to replace the cramped, dilapidated local meeting hall with a new building and rent out the old one to schools after renovation. Several months later, T.D. Hannecke won the £1,509 bid for construction, and on Saturday, July 30, 1904, Rev. Meiring laid the cornerstone. Speaking of the occasion, Rev. Nel said “that it will not be long before an independent congregation would be founded in Turffontein” (quoted in the August 1904 issue of the Transvaal NGK magazine De Vereeniging). It is not clear exactly when the building was finished and inaugurated.

Hannecke's work was clearly done by mid-November, when the council decided at its meeting to wait to dedicate the building until after it was furnished. That August, the Jeppestown council accepted a separate £400 bid for furniture and a pulpit from the Van Hoogstraten brothers. Whatever delayed delivery and thus the opening, the church was in operation before 1904 was out.

== Leadup to secession ==
The August 26, 1903 issue of De Vereeniging told of the need for a new congregation to serve the suburbs south of the “Reef” (the main gold vein). Of these, Ophirton and Booysens were part of Johannesburg East, and Turffontein and La Rochelle belonged to Jeppestown. The two congregations agreed to hire a curate to prepare the area for secession, an idea endorsed by both Dr. Hendrik Adriaan Lamprecht (Rev. Meiring's successor at Johannesburg East) and Rev. Nel at the August 1905 Jeppestown council meeting. The two congregations requested and received the help of Rev. J.D. de Villiers, at the time a curate for Jeppestown, to handle the task.

For a little over two months, Rev. De Villiers worked among the members in the southern suburbs, some of whom submitted petitions for secession to their respective councils. In Early October 1905, the Ophirton and Booysens wards resolved at congregation meetings to submit secession petitions to the Johannesburg East council, which adopted by unanimous vote on the 10th the following motion: “the church council takes great notice of the meeting in Ophirton and the decision taken there, and is willing to entertain the request provided legal requirements are met.”

The Turffontein ward members came to this conclusion as well around the same time. Within a week of Johannesburg East's above reply, Turffontein petitioned the Jeppestown council, asking “for the founding of a new church south of the Reef and funds to build a parsonage and maintain public services,” according to the council meeting notes. The council referred the issue to the Ring but declined to provide the money until similar contributions could be obtained from Johannesburg East.

Several weeks later, Rev. Nel and two of the Jeppestown elders attended the Johannesburg East council meeting. After they pledged to deed property worth £3,800 to the new congregation, namely several plots of land in Turffontein and La Rochelle where the local church halls were, the Johannesburg East council granted property worth £1,600 in Ophirton and a stipend of £250 a year for the first four years. Thus, the new congregation would start with three halls (including a new and well-furnished one in Turffontein) and £1,000 in seed money.

== Secession ==
With the foundation thus set, the Potchefstroom Ring Committee met on the morning of Wednesday, February 28, 1906 in the Turffontein church to officially declare the secession. That night, a congregation meeting elected the first council members in the same building. Two weeks later, the March 8 De Vereeniging reported on the foundation of “a new congregation south of the Reef, named the La Rochelle Dutch Reformed Church.” The reported announced that a Jeppestown representative would serve as consulent and clarified the new congregation's boundaries.

== Etymology of La Rochelle ==
Its name would spring from the local suburb of La Rochelle, which Ring Committee member Rev. Louw of Heidelberg compared to “The Rock Christ.” The name of the suburb, of course, came from La Rochelle, France, the last fortress of the Huguenots of whom so many came to South Africa.

== Early years ==
The congregation's first pastor were Revs. C.F. Mynhardt (1907–10) and S.W. van Niekerk (1911–21). The third, Rev. T.A. Broodrijk, was invested on October 29, 1921, and under him the parsonage was built and the congregation decided to build a church, which would be dedicated on September 4, 1925, though the organ would not be used until September 3, 1927. A 1929 tornado destroyed the hall alongside the new church, which would be replaced by a new one that opened in May 1930. The Rev. Broodrijk was assisted by proponent J.H. van Loggerenberg from December 1929 to September 1930. On May 17, 1932, the pastor reported to the council that all debts were paid, but he died on August 17 and would be buried in the churchyard. His wife and two children left the area on December 4, 1932, his gravestone emblazoned with the words “he did what he could.”

The Rev. T.C. Esterhuysen served for the first nine months after Rev. Broodryk's death. Meanwhile, the council saw the need for further secession and therefore bought eight plots worth £1,600 in Rosettenville. £11,000 had been raised over the 11 years leading up to 1932 for the purpose.

== La Rochelle becomes Turffontein ==
Rev. A.H. Stander (May 1933-April 1948) and J. de Jager (1948–58) saw tenures marked by heavy secessions. In 1938, the Rosettenville Reformed Church seceded, prompting the mother church to be renamed to Turffontein given La Rochelle belonging to the new Rosettenville territory. In August 1947, another congregation seceded, the Forest Hill Reformed Church.

Within the first year of the Rev. and Mrs. De Jager's arrival as the fifth pastoral couple in the congregation, the Reverend warned the council of yet more departures. The secession of the Johannesburg South Reformed Church (NGK), officially finalized on November 15, 1950 in the Booysens police station cafeteria, was the third in eleven years and left Turffontein an urban congregation with around 980 members. £3,000 in endowments were raised within a short time to improve Johannesburg South's buildings.

== Merger with Johannesburg South ==
An additional factor in the April 24, 1994 merger with Johannesburg South as Deo Gloria, besides the March 1992 fire that destroyed Turffontein's church, was the retirement of Rev. J.L. Coetzee, second and final pastor of Johannesburg South from 1955 to 1994. According to the final NGK Yearbook, Turffontein in 1994 had 90 baptized members and 346 confirmed ones while Johannesburg South had respective figures of 62 and 252. The Johannesburg South church on the corner of Alamein and Faunce Roads in Robertsham is home to Deo Gloria, whose 58 baptized and 367 confirmed members of 2010 have been served by Rev. A.D.P. de Villiers since 1999.

== Select pastors ==
- Charles Frederik Mynhardt, 12 April 1908–1910
- S.W. van Niekerk, 1911–1921
- Thomas Arnoldus Broodrijk, 1921 – August 17, 1932 (died in office; his only congregation)
- Adriaan Hendrickus Stander, 1933–1948
- Daniel Ferdinand Bosman (Dan) de Beer, 1935–1937 (curate)
- Johannes Petrus Grobler, 1943–1944 (curate)
- Jacob de Jager, 1948–1958
- Cornelis Albertys van Wyk, 1958–1963
- Jacobus Cornelius le Roux, 1963–1969
- Roelof Johannes Janse van Vuuren, 1969–1973
- Jan van der Vloed, 1973–1977
- Francois Jacobus Joubert, 1978–1986
- Hendrik Christoffel van der Merwe, 1985–1992
- Johan Willem Ludwig Gebhardt, 1987–1990
- Stephanus Petrus Kloppers, 1990–1995 (then Deo Gloria until 1999)

== Sources ==
- Acts of the 4th Conference of the South Transvaal NGK Synod, Pretoria, March 26–27, 1963.
- Albertyn, J.R. (chairman) (1947). Kerk en stad. Stellenbosch: Pro Ecclesia-Boekhandel.
- Dreyer, Rev. A. (1932). Jaarboek van die Nederduits-Gereformeerde Kerke in Suid-Afrika vir die jaar 1933. Cape Town: Jaarboek-Kommissie van die Raad van die Kerke.
- Dreyer, Rev. A. (1924). Eeuwfeest-Album van de Nederduits Gereformeerde-Kerk in Zuid-Afrika 1824–1924. Cape Town: Publikatie-kommissie van de Z.A. Bijbelvereniging.
- Gaum, Dr. Frits (ed.) (1989). Jaarboek van die Nederduitse Gereformeerde Kerke 1990. Pretoria: Tydskriftemaatskappy van die Nederduitse Gereformeerde Kerk.
- Maree, W.L. (ed.) (1978). Jaarboek van die Nederduitse Gereformeerde Kerke 1979. Johannesburg: Tydskriftemaatskappy van die Nederduitse Gereformeerde Kerk.
- Olivier, Rev. P.L. (compiler) (1952). Ons gemeentelike feesalbum. Cape Town/Pretoria: N.G. Kerk-uitgewers.
- Smit, Rev. A.P. (1948). Ons Kerk in die Goudstad (1887–1947). Cape Town: Church councils of Johannesburg, Fordsburg, Johannesburg East, and Jeppestown.
- Stals, Prof. Dr. E.L.P. (ed.) (1986). Afrikaners in die Goudstad, vol. 2: 1924–1961. Pretoria: HAUM Opvoedkundige Uitgewery.
