= Brixton Reformed Church =

Congregation of the Dutch Reformed Church in South Africa

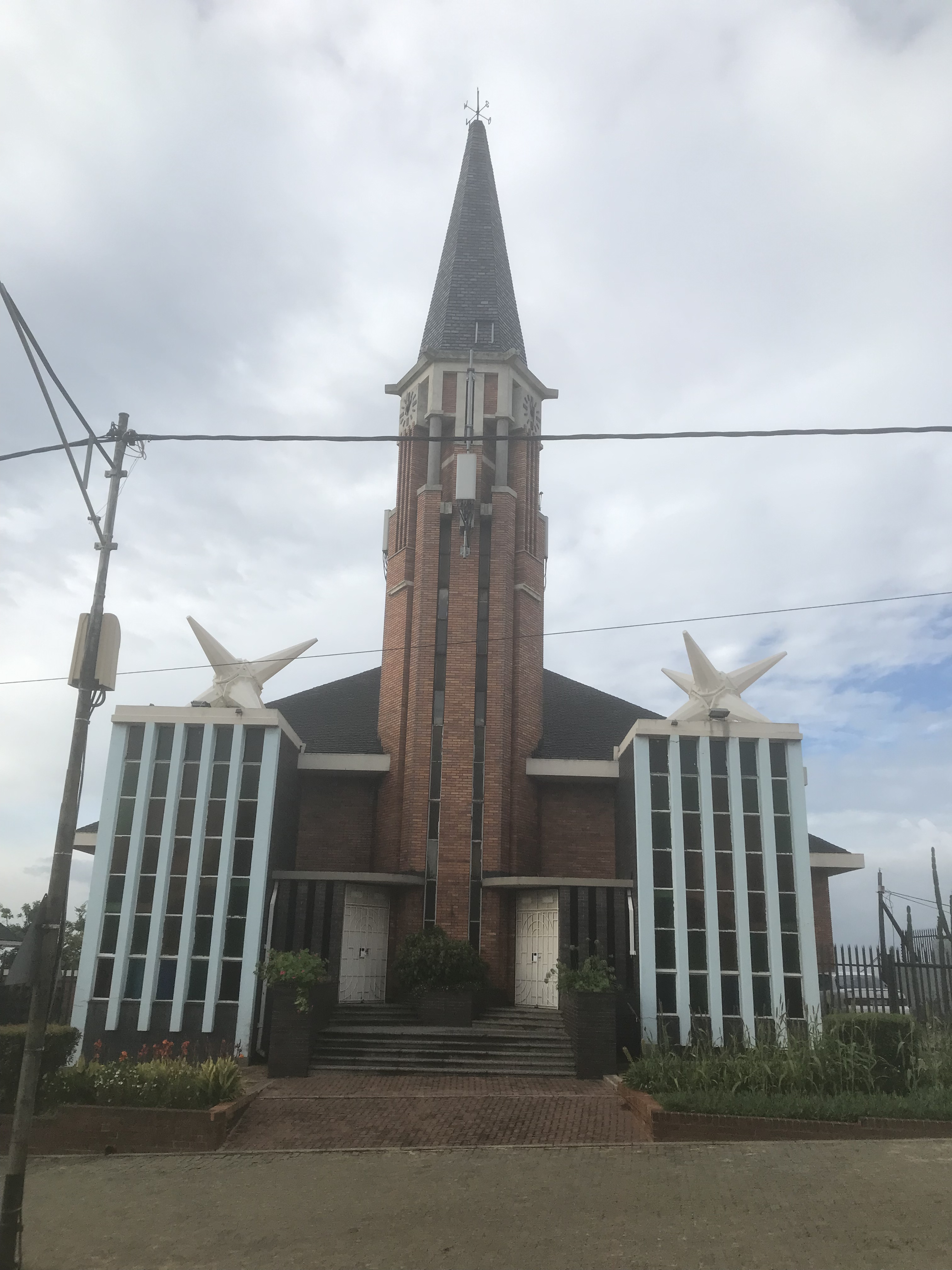
Brixton Kerk

The Brixton Reformed Church was a congregation of the Dutch Reformed Church in South Africa (NGK) in the western suburbs of Johannesburg, South Africa, which was absorbed along with the Johannesburg West Reformed Church (NGK) in 1993 into the new Vergesig Reformed Church. Brixton's centrally located building continues to serve the merged congregation, which has since acquired the Langlaagte Reformed Church (itself earlier absorbing the Fordsburg Reformed Church and its old component the Mayfair Reformed Church) as well as the Crosby West Reformed Church. Around 1985, the Cottesloe Reformed Church was also absorbed into the original Brixton congregation. Around 2014, Vergesig changed its name to Brixton Church.

== Background ==
Worshipers from Vrdedorp and Brixton began agitating in church council meetings for their own district or curate as early as the tenure of Rev. J.S. Marais (pastor of Fordsburg, 1920-1925). The council was recalcitrant despite the overtures of the secretaryof the Johannesburg Ring (sub-synod), telling the representative that “the council of Fordsburg refuses to give up a single member of its congregation” (February 1922 meeting notes).

The Ring considered the Fordsburg congregation unwieldy and insisted at least on a curate, who would prove difficult to recruit and maintain, as a Rev. Venter who stayed for just three months in 1924 proved. Several months later, the council secured rev. D.J.J. Roussouw for the post, but left after only six months. When the Rev. Marais was replaced by the Rev. J.C. Pauw, the Ring once again presented a growing consensus throughout the Transvaal NGK Synod that a thousand members per pastor was an ideal ratio, clearly justifying a curate or secession in this case.

At the 1926 Ring Conference in Waterval, a Fordsburg census of 1,500-1,600 members led the Ring Committee to condemn the Fordsburg council's refusal to procure help. After the Committee spoke once more with the council that October, the council agreed to separate its part of Vrededorp given their experience with curates. The Fordsburg council offered to have the Vrederus Reformed Church do the same with its slice of that suburb, which thus released the adjacent territories on August 26, 1927 as the Vrededorp congregation (later Cottesloe). Vrederus was renamed Melville to avoid confusion.

== Fordsburg refuses Brixton secession ==
No sooner had Vrededorp seceded when the Ring Committee reiterated its judgment of the congregation as too large for a single pastor and therefore requiring further secession. The Fordsburg council felt the Committee was too hasty, and the Fordsburg secretary replied that “the recent secession led to the council bestowing £7 10 s. a month for two years on the new Vrededorp congregation. Before that matter is resolved, the council cannot proceed with further division” (church council notes, April 1928).

Two years later, once that subsidy was paid out, the Ring Committee again approached the Fordsburg council pleading for at least a Brixton curate. Eventually, in March 1931, proponent D.S. Lubbe came to fill that role, but he left scarcely a month later, and the council “decided that no more curates would be sought at this time” (council notes, May 1931). After two years, elder P.C.N. Jooste declared “that the congregation had grown too large for only one pastor…and that the time had come for part of it to be served by a curate” (council notes, October 1933).

== Purchasing a site in Brixton ==
Despairing of ever finding a curate who would stay, the council came around to the idea of allowing a Brixton congregation to secede. Therefore, the council purchased the Brixton Freemasons’ hall in 1935 for £775. Although originally intended more for office hours, sales, and Sunday school in the district than for worship services, the purchase led to talk of Brixton and Mayfair West seceding at the council meetings. In February 1937, the council set up a special commission to examine the issue.

== Final secession ==
At the April 27, 1937 council meeting, the commission reported 855 members living in Brixton and Mayfair West and recommended these wards be let go. The council agreed, negotiated the new boundaries, and at next month's meeting awarded the Brixton hall and £750 to the prospective congregation. However, Rev. Pauw became gravely ill, delaying further consideration of the move.

After Rev. Pauw's death in November 1937, the council resumed their work and elder De Kock submitted the plans to the Ring Committee for releasing Brixton, Mayfair West, and Crosby. The council also agreed to postpone searching for a new pastor for themselves until the splits were complete. After the Langlaagte council agreed to donate land between St. Fillans Avenue and St. Gotthard Street to the new congregation, the Ring Committee declared Brixton its own church on April 20, 1938.

== First daughter church ==
On May 1, 1944, the Ring Committee separated the Mayfair West and Crosby districts from Brixton as Johannesburg West. The Brixton church on corner of Indra Street and St. Albans Avenue was now in the new congregation, which therefore had to pay a pro rata share of the original construction costs to help build a new church building on Putney Road around 600 km northeast of the old one. Johannesburg West started with 871 members. When Brixton and Johannesburg West later merged again as Vergesig, the newer church near the Brixton Tower became that congregation's home while the old mother church became the home of the Islam Centre for Africa.

== Cottesloe acquired ==
Gradual emigration from the western suburbs further from midtown (especially to Roodepoort and the northwestern suburbs), NGK congregations began shrinking. The Cottesloe congregation had only 294 members led by Rev. M.P. van Wyk in 1984. Originally seeking to merge with Fordsburg, the latter's denial led to Cottesloe merging with Brixton after a year after the last Cottesloe pastor's resignation. The Cottesloe church building has since then been home to the Lam Rim Tibetan Buddhist Centre.

== Location ==
The main Brixton church building, designed by Leendert Geers and Geurt Geers, is on 43 Putney Road in Brixton.

== Pastors ==
- Willem Christiaan Bouwer, 1938–1950 (first pastor, his first congregation)
- Gerhardus Jacobus Swart, 1951–1952 (his first congregation, later missionary among Jews and for 22 years active in the Andrew Murray Congregation)
- Richard Barry Murray, 1952–1955
- Pieter Cillié Malan, 1956–1958
- Pieter Willem Marais, 1958–1960
- Jacobus Francois Myburgh, 1961–1965
- Coenraad Hendrik Lourens Mouton, 1965 – November 28, 1971 (retirement)
- Johannes Dewald van der Merwe, 1972–1976
- Elwyn Patton Vivier, 1977–1981
- Jacobus Johannes Sevenster, January 9, 1982 – 1986 (?)
- Christoph Thomas Müller, April 18, 1986 – 1990
- Johannes Benjamin Visser, September 1990 – merger (thereafter pastor of Vergesig until 2009)

== Missionary pastor ==
- Chris Fourie, 1973–? (serving islands off the eastern coast of southern Africa)

== Sources ==
- Gaum, Dr. Frits (ed.) et al. Jaarboek van die Nederduitse Gereformeerde Kerke. Pretoria/Cape Town/Wellington: Tydskriftemaatskappy van die Nederduitse Gereformeerde Kerk.
- Olivier, Rev. P.L. (1952). Ons gemeentelike feesalbum. Cape Town/Pretoria: N.G. Kerk-uitgewers, 1952.
