= Langlaagte Reformed Church =

Church in Johannesburg, South Africa

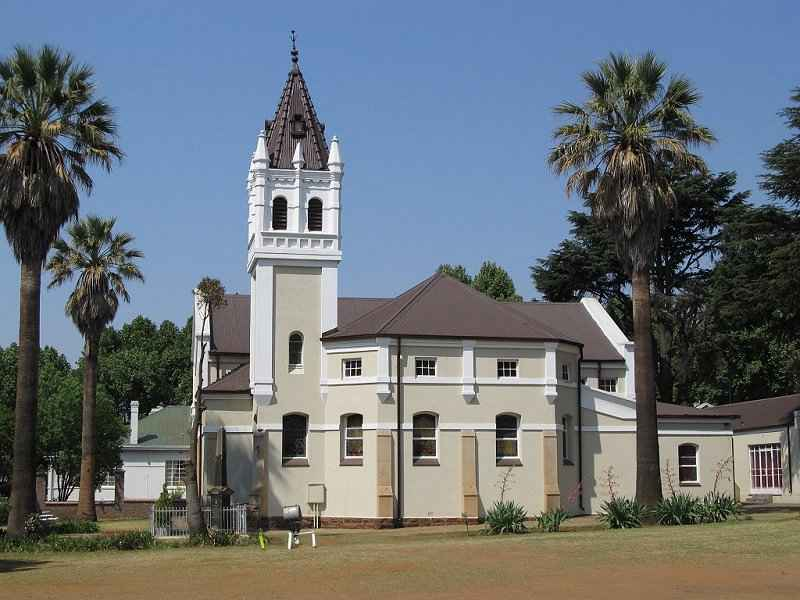

The Langlaagte Reformed Church (originally called Witwatersrand West) was the 28th congregation of the Dutch Reformed Church in South Africa (NGK) on the Transvaal and the second in Johannesburg after the Johannesburg Reformed Church (NGK) (1887). The congregation is well known as the spiritual home of the Langlaagte orphanage, later named the Abraham Kriel Children's Home after Rev. Abraham Kriel, who founded it as pastor of Langlaagte.

The Langlaagte Reformed Church existed for 104 years until 1996-97, when it was absorbed by the Vergesig Reformed Church (based in the Brixton Reformed Church building). The Fordsburg Reformed Church (eventually renamed Gold City or Goudstad) had already been absorbed by Langlaagte in 1988, prompting a renaming of the latter to Goudlaagte. Langlaagte restored its original name by the time of its absorption.

== Discovery of gold ==
The discovery of an outcropping of gold ore in 1886 on Langlaagte Farm, from which a village and later the suburb of Langlaagte North take their names, precipitated a decade of massive immigration that would propel Johannesburg past Cape Town as the largest city in what would become South Africa. Shortly after gold was first found, it became clear that the main vein or reef (the Rand) stretched 50 km from east to west.

The traditional story held that a roving Australian prospector named George Harrison had found the precious metal on said farm, owned by the widow of a Gerhardus Cornelis Oosthuizen, on a Sunday in March 1886. He was said to have sold his claim for 20 rands.

A National Investigation Committee, however, awarded the honor to a P.J. Marais in 1941 after a comprehensive research effort. Two more contenders include Hermanus Johannes van Staden, Ousthuizen's son-in-law, and a Peter Bernardus de Ville.

34 years before the official date, in 1852, J.H. Davis discovered the first gold on the Rand at a farm near Krugersdorp but was forced to keep quiet about it by the South African Republic (ZAR) government of the time. State President of the South African Republic Paul Kruger purchased the three parcels of Langlaagte that Oosthuizen owned in 1886 for settlement and mining claim assignment.

Johannesburg, however, developed from Randjeslaagte Farm. The city was named after Johann Rissik, the acting surveyor-general, and district field cornet Johannes Pieter Meyer.

== Background to congregation foundation ==
The city was part of the area served by the Heidelberg Reformed Church (NGK) until it got its own congregation. Landowners had been leaving the Cape Colony for the Highveld since around 1840 to escape British rule. Building on the efforts of the Rev. Abraham Kriel of the Du Toit's Pan Reformed Church, his curate, proponent J.N. Martins, began preaching full-time on the Rand.

The gold rush brought people from all over the world to the area. As far as can be determined, the Rev. Stephanus Jacobus du Toit, the Superintendent of Education of the ZAR, led the first NGK service in Johannesburg. At the open-air service, held on a Sunday in mid-1886 in the shadow of a willow near where the later Langlaagte Reformed Church and Abraham Kriel Orphanage would later stand, Rev. Du Toit sermonized on Genesis 2:12, “and the gold of that land is good.”

The NGK contingent among the new settlers of the Rand largely settled in the western portion of what is now downtown, in what was then known as the “Dip.” This included the poorer neighborhoods of Langlaagte, Fordsburg, and Vrededorp, the only portions of the area then that were majority-Afrikaner. The wealthier northern (Parktown, Houghton) and northeastern (Observatory, Orange Grove) neighborhoods were almost exclusively English. Upwardly mobile Afrikaners later settled in large numbers in the northwestern areas such as Melville, Westdene, Auckland Park, Northcliff, Linden, and Randburg, among others. To a lesser extent than in the “Dip,” Afrikaners also settled in the area of Jeppestown, just east of downtown. Consequently, while 14 NGK congregations sprang up in the 8 km west of city hall, 5 were founded to the east.

== Foundation ==
The influx of Afrikaners to the western side of the goldfields led to this part of the congregation, known as the Witwatersrand West ward, seceding on Saturday, October 15, 1892. The area included four villages, including Langlaagte, Maraisburg, Fordsburg, and Florida, all of which would eventually have congregations of their own. Members chose Langlaagte for the central church and parsonage, though another source holds that the first place of worship was built in Fordsburg and destroyed two months later by train cars of dynamite exploding on the way to Braamfontein. The Fordsburg Reformed Church itself separated in 1896.

Rev. Kriel, pastor of the Du Toit's Pan Reformed Church, was invested on June 2, 1893, as Langlaagte's first pastor. He served a large area, stretching from the Vaal River in the south to the Jukskei River in the north and Roodepoort in the west, to which he actively minister by horse-cart. The mining-camp atmosphere in the congregation was such that the secretary once wrote the chief of police to thank him on the church council's behalf for preserving order during Sunday services.

== Buildings ==
The first church was made from wood and zinc and featured an organ played by Mrs. Kriel, who led the hymns as well.

At a congregation meeting on April 2, 1898, members agreed to build a 600-pew church, and in March 1899, the cornerstone would be laid. Completion would await the end of the Second Boer War. The Rev. Kriel enlisted with the Boer Commandos immediately and would not return until the war was over. The church opened on December 12, 1902 on the corner of Church Square and Marais Street.

== Langlaagte Orphanage ==
The Rev. Kriel first established the local orphanage on September 4, 1902 to house seven of the around 12,000 war orphans. By the end of the year, 92 called the orphanage home, reaching 245 in September 1903. Since his investiture, Rev. Kriel remained commitment to the care of orphans and homeless children, an endeavor in which he was assisted since 1896 by Boland social worker Maria Kloppers, a member of the Vrouesendingbond.

The orphanage inspired similar foundations by Rev. J.M. Louw at the Boksburg Reformed Church and Rev. A.P. Burger of Middelburg, Mpumalanga church in October–November 1902. The Langlaagte orphanage absorbed the Boksburg one in 1904 and the Middelburg one in 1908. Under Rev. Kriel and Mrs. Kloppers, the orphanage grew considerably and in 1913 purchased two plots. It had no fixed income but managed to stay solvent “in answer to prayers,” as Rev. Kriel put it. Dr. William Nicol, pastor of Johannesburg East said Rev. Kriel often said “I thank the Lord for being obedient, but was doubtlessly full of faith. Whenever I tell myself to believe, I get scared. But if I just shut my eyes in obedience and follow my commands, the Lord will assure all is well.” By the time of his death, the orphanage that would bear his name housed more than 600 children.

The main campus is today opposite the church building, which since the merger with Vergesis has housed Glory Divine World Ministries. The Rev. Kriel and his wife are buried in the churchyard under a gravestone featuring his own trellis design.

== Location ==
The building, which the Vergesig Reformed Church (also called the Brighton Church) sold around 2015, is on the corner of Church Square and Marais Streets in Paarlshoop.

== Daughter churches ==
The following congregations directly seceded from Langlaagte:

- Fordsburg (1896)
- Waterval (1921)
- Florida (1940)

== Select pastors ==
- Abraham Kriel, 1893 to Mei 1917 (retired om subsequently full-time orphanage director)
- Johannes Albertus Roux Volsteedt, 1905 to 1906
- Dirk Pieter Momberg Olivier, 1918 to 1921
- Jan Hendrik Malan Stofberg, 1920 to 1926
- Johannes Daniël van Niekerk, June 25, 1927 to 1946 (his first congregation)
- Jan Hendrik Petrus van Rooyen, 1946 to 1959 (retired)
- Gabriel Antonie van der Westhuizen, 1960 to 1965
- Pieter Johannes Bloem, June 15, 1965 to November 9, 1969
- Christiaan Coenraad Myburgh, 1970 to 1974
- Jacobus Jooste Crous, January 17, 1976 to 1985
- André Gideon Scheepers, 1982 to 1984
- Zacharias Petrus le Roux, 1984 to 1985
- Deon Louw, February 2, 1986 to 1996 (?)
