= Parkhurst Reformed Church =

South African Dutch Reform congregation (1944–1996)

The Parkhurst Reformed Church was a congregation of the Dutch Reformed Church in South Africa (NGK) that was active from 1944 to 1996 in the Johannesburg suburb of Parkhurst.

== Background ==
After 1933, increases in the price of gold and the resulting economic boom on the Witwatersrand led to massive immigration from other provinces and the Transvaal plateau to Johannesburg, requiring new NGK congregations to be formed. In the first 50 years of the city, 23 congregations were founded in the Rand, but from 1936 to 1946, the number reached 36. In 1946, the Rand included five Rings (sub-Synods) of 59 congregations with 66 pastoral positions and 122,014 collective members.

== Foundation ==
Following the secession of the Johannesburg North Reformed Church (NGK) from its mother churches (the Johannesburg Reformed Church (NGK) and the Johannesburg East Reformed Church (NGK) in 1942, the northern portions of the latter two explored another secession. The area in question of Johannesburg East had grown considerably since the 1913 ordination of Rev. William Nicol. According to an article in the March 1923 issue of the Irenenuus, the ward (which included Parkhurst, Parkview, Parkwood, Parktown North, and Rosebank) served 64 families including 134 NGK members. Although Parkhurst had been part of elder Lourens Geldenhuys’s ward, Jukskei River, only a handful of members lived there, but rapid growth prompted Rev. Nicol and the council to green-light the building of a ward church. By mid-1923, there were enough parishioners to support a church choir led by an elder, the third in the district after those at the Irene (main Johannesburg Easwt) and Norwood (later Johannesburg North) buildings, which were spearheaded by Mrs. Nicol, a trained music teacher and the Irene Church's organist.

In addition to the church hall in the Johannesburg East portion of Parkhurst, a meeting hall had been built in Craighall for £900 on ground the Johannesburg congregation bought for £225 in April 1939.

On September 5, 1944, the Johannesburg Ring Committee and the Johannesburg and Johannesburg East councils agreed to release Parkhurst as an independent congregation within two years. The Johannesburg Reformed Church still had 2,340 members after Norwood and Parkhurst left, and they would be the last wards to directly secede from the mother church. The same year, three other congregations would be founded in the Johannesburg area, including Johannesburg West, Bezuidenhout Valley, and Randburg, of which only Randburg was independent.

The first council meeting was on September 11, 1944, in the Parkhurst hall, bequeathed to the congregation by Johannesburg East while Johannesburg gave up the one in Lyndhurst. On January 29, 1945, Parkhurst hired Christopher Murray, at the time a curate for Johannesburg East, as pastor, a post he accepted on April 6 of that year and for which he was ordained the following day. A construction fund for a proper church was founded on June 18, and a monthly congregation newsletter would begin publication on September 3.

On April 15, 1946, the council selected and purchased a site on the corner of 10th and 2nd Streets in Parkhurst. The council then submitted its first plan for the church building on May 5, 1947. Ground was broken on June 11, 1949, and that August 6, Rev. Murray laid the cornerstone engraved with the words, “whoever trusts in the high God cannot build on sand,” from the Parable of the Wise and Foolish Builders in the Gospel of Matthew. Rev. Nicol delivered the keynote sermon for the inauguration the weekend of May 13–14, 1950.

== Second pastor ==
After turning down several offers, Rev. Murray accepted one from the Loubser Reformed Church in Nairobi in March 1951, resigning the 29th and bid farewell by the congregation the next day. The Rev. Beyers Naudé turned down the Parkhurst council's offer, but Rev. C.S. Hattingh of Wolmaransstad accepted it on April 30 and was confirmed the weekend of June 22–24.

Between 1947 and 1951, the congregation had grown from 850 to 900 members, but the total population including children had reached 1,500. The council numbered 44 by 1951, with 30 teachers in three Sunday schools teaching 300 students.

== Drs. Jan van Rooyen and Beyers Naudé ==
In 1958, Rev. (later Dr.) Jan Hendrik Petrus van Rooyen (born on June 16, 1928, in Garies, Namaqualand) came from Dannhauser, Natal to Parkhurst. In 1964, he earned his Doctor of Theology from the University of Utrecht. The Rev. Van Rooyen would serve until his 1985 retirement as chairman of the Ring Mission Committee and from 1975 to 1985 headed the Synod Mission Committee as well. A stalwart ecumenist, he was described by Kerkbode after his June 13, 2002, death as follows: “he played a major role in the Transvaal church—especially in the stormy years after the Cottesloe Consultation. He was for a long time involved with Beyers Naudé’s Christian Institute for Southern Africa, but later went in another direction.”

When Naudé lost his pastorate in the Aasvoëlkop Reformed Church over in early November 1963 over his work in the dissident paper Pro Veritate and the Institute, he and his wife, Ilse, were granted leave to stay in the Parkhurst parsonage until the end of the month. Naudé wrote in his autobiography, My land van Hoop:

We realized this was the start of a fork in the road. I and Ilse also realized that we must find ourselves a home, and about which church would provide it. It clearly made no sense to stay in Aasvoëlkop, even if we could afford it. We had virtually no savings. The fact that Dr. Jan van Rooyen in Parkhurst sympathized so strongly with the idea of an organization such as the Christian Institute, coupled with the generally lower housing prices there, led me and Ilse to sell our house in Greenside and join the Parkhurst congregation.

Naudé stayed there until October 1978, when the General Synod of the NGK in Bloemfontein refused to merge with the three so-called daughter churches, the ones for blacks, Cape Coloureds, and Indian South Africans. He wrote that he “simply could not remain with a pure conscience a member of a Church rejecting the Biblical command of church unity.” His wife, however, did not join the Dutch Reformed Church in Afrika (black) congregation in Alexandra, since she wanted to stay active in Parkhurst, knew nobody there, and her husband could not accompany her given his having been placed under house arrest.

== Absorption by Parksig ==
The congregation was absorbed in 1996 by the Parksig Reformed Church, creating the Parkkruin Reformed Church. The Parkhurst building was sold off and the Parksig building in Parkview became the center of the new church, in part because Parkhurst had fewer children in need of Sunday school classes. In 2011, Parkkruin had 608 confirmed and 319 baptized members, a 1.9:1 ratio compared to the 4.1:1 average for the NGK as a whole.

== Pastors ==
- Christoper Murray, 1945 - 1951.
- Carel Stefanus Hattingh, 1951 - 1958.
- Dr. Jan Hendrik Petrus van Rooyen, 1958 - 1985 (second and last congregation after Dannhauser from 1953–58).
- Christiaan Johannes Jacobus Stegmann, 1986 - 1989
- Barend Johannes Burger Smit, 1990 - 1992 (from the ministry).
- Dr. Carel Johannes Hugo, 1992 - 1996 (final pastor).

== Sources ==
- Albertyn, J.R. (chairman) (1947). Kerk en stad. Stellenbosch: Pro Ecclesia-Boekhandel.
- Naudé, Beyers (1995). My land van hoop, die lewe van Beyers Naudé. Cape Town: Human & Rousseau.
- Gaum, Dr. Frits (red.) (1989). Jaarboek van die Nederduitse Gereformeerde Kerke 1990. Pretoria: Tydskriftemaatskappy van die Nederduitse Gereformeerde Kerk.
- Gaum, Dr. Frits (red.) (2002). Jaarboek van die Nederduitse Gereformeerde Kerke 2003. Tygervallei: Tydskriftemaatskappy van die Nederduitse Gereformeerde Kerk.
- Olivier, Rev. P.L. (compiler) (1952). Ons gemeentelike feesalbum. Cape Town/Pretoria: N.G. Kerk-uitgewers.
- Smit, Rev. A.P. (1948). Ons Kerk in die Goudstad (1887 - 1947). Cape Town: Church councils of Johannesburg, Fordsburg, Johannesburg East, and Jeppestown.
- Stals, Prof. Dr. E.L.P. (ed.) (1986). Afrikaners in die Goudstad, vol. 2: 1924-1961. Pretoria: HAUM Opvoedkundige Uitgewery.
- Small, Mario (compiler) (2011). 2011 Jaarboek van die Nederduitse Gereformeerde Kerke. Wellington: Tydskriftemaatskappy.
