= Doornfontein Synagogue =

Orthodox synagogue in Johannesburg, South Africa

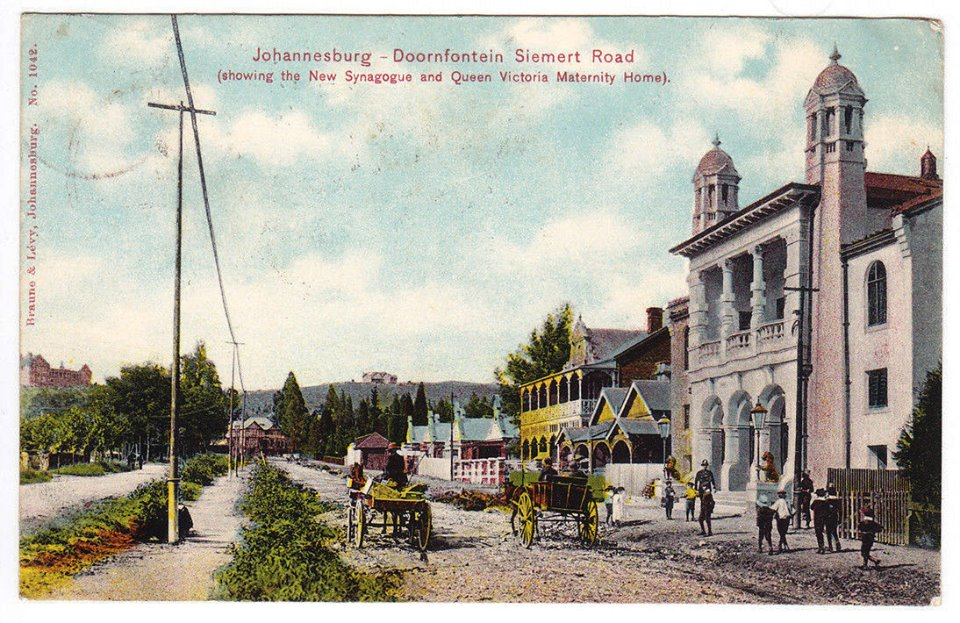
- Postcard of the synagogue, dated in 1905

- Location of the synagogue in Greater Johannesburg

Religion
- Affiliation: Orthodox Judaism
- Ecclesiastical or organizational status: Synagogue
- Status: Active

Location
- Location: 120 Siemert Road, New Doornfontein, Johannesburg, Gauteng
- Country: South Africa
- Interactive map of Doornfontein Synagogue
- Coordinates: 26°11′39″S 28°03′30″E

Architecture
- Architect: Morrie Jacob Harris
- Type: Synagogue architecture
- Style: Eclectic
- Established: c. 1880s (as a congregation)
- Completed: 1906
- Construction cost: £4,000

The Doornfontein Synagogue or Lions Synagogue is an Orthodox Jewish congregation and synagogue, located at 120 Siemert Road, New Doornfontein, in Greater Johannesburg, in the region of Gauteng, South Africa. It is the oldest synagogue in use in South Africa. The synagogue is located two blocks from Ellis Park Stadium.

== History ==
The neighbourhood of Doornfontein was founded in 1886, and after wealthy residents moved to more affluent neighbourhoods in the aftermath of the Anglo-Boer War, Doornfontein became popular with Jewish immigrants from the United Kingdom and Western Europe. Beit Street in Doornfontein was once the commercial hub of the neighborhood, with Kosher butchers and other Jewish merchants. During the 1880s, religious services were held at the nearby Rand Club and at private residences.

The Lions Synagogue was the third synagogue to be built in the neighbourhood. It was built in 1905 at a cost of £4,000 and nicknamed the "Lions Synagogue" (also commonly known as Lions Shul) after the two cast iron lions watching over either side of the entrance. The architect was Morrie Jacob Harris. A fire damaged the building in 1930. It has been completely restored, but the original look has therefore changed.

The synagogue was documented and photographed by renowned photographer, David Goldblatt in 2014.

To the left of the synagogue was a Jewish Community Center, which was added in the 1950s as part of an extension to the building. This was later sold off and converted for other uses as the congregation's membership resettled to other suburbs. The synagogue was led by Rabbi Ilan Herrmann until 2017. Herrmann had served the congregation for the last 18 years. Today, the synagogue usually has about 60 congregants for weekly Shabbat services and about 200 congregants for the High Holy Days. Most current congregants live outside of Doornfontein, in Sandton, Morningside and Highlands North.

== See also ==
- History of the Jews in South Africa
- List of synagogues in South Africa
