= Johannesburg North Reformed Church (NGK) =

Congregation of the Dutch Reformed Church in South Africa

The Johannesburg North Reformed Church/Andrew Murray Congregation (since November 2011 known as the Andrew Murray Reformed Church) is a bilingual (Afrikaans and English) congregation of the Dutch Reformed Church in South Africa (NGK) in the Johannesburg suburb of Orchards. It was formed in 1999 by the merger of the NGK congregation and the Andrew Murray Congregation and functions as a church without borders.

== Background: Johannesburg North ==
The congregation dates to the emergence of the suburbs of Orange Grove, Norwood, Orchards, and Sydenham immediately after World War II. Afrikaners who settled in northeastern Johannesburg had largely been part of the Johannesburg Reformed Church (NGK) (with the Braamfontein church) or the Johannesburg East Reformed Church (NGK) (based at the Irene Church). These two were the mother churches of both the Parkhurst Reformed Church (1944) and Johannesburg North. The Irene Church had a satellite church building in Orchards that became the base for the Johannesburg North congregation.

== Foundation of Johannesburg North ==
The need for a separate congregation in the northeastern suburbs grew more pressing around 1950. The Johannesburg church council first raised the issue at its December 1939 meeting, while the Johannesburg East council readily approved Norwood's secession in April 1942. Thus Johannesburg North officially separated from the two mother congregations on June 26, 1942 in the Norwood church hall. The main Johannesburg church gave the new congregation a starting grant of £1,000, while Johannesburg East bequeathed its properties in Lyndhurst and Norwood (including the Norwood church). The third interview proved the charm, and Rev. J.J. Odendaal of the Jeppestown Reformed Church was hired and invested in January 1943 as the congregation's first pastor. At a March 1945 congregation meeting, many members pledged to help start a construction fund for a church.

The Rev. Odendaal left in June 1946 for a post in Vereeniging, to be replaced six months later in January 1947 by Rev. Attie Burger. The Rev. Burger's first congregation was the Paulpietersburg Reformed Church (NGK) in northern Natal, where he helped found the NGK monthly Die Voorligter, and later he moved on the Pretoria North Reformed Church (NGK) and founded there the Christian Social Council, the first community center with a full-time social worker ministering to poor Afrikaners. By 1947, there were around 800 members in Johannesburg North.

The Rev. Burger continued his predecessor's work toward church building construction, leading a congregation meeting the year of his investiture to institute monthly donations for the purpose. In 1949, the congregation was ready to hire as contractor the Afrikaans singer Gé Korsten’s father Cor Korsten, a 1936 immigrant from the Netherlands who settled his family locally. The Rev. Burger laid the cornerstone of the new church on June 17, 1950, and it was finished on February 18, 1951. Only eleven months later, on January 5, 1952, Rev. Burger married the contractor's daughter Elna in the new building. Along with this church hall on 17 Oaklands Rd, the congregation also owned on in the Lyndhurst district, which became the center of the Northeast Rand Reformed Church formed in 1959.

== Later developments ==
Northeast Rand was the only daughter church of Johannesburg North, but Johannesburg East spawned Johannesburg-Observatory in 1964 as well, yielding three congregations covering the northeastern suburbs. Numbers of Afrikaans-speakers, and therefore congregation memberships in the area, began to decline in the early 1970s. In 1973, Johannesburg North had 448 confirmed members, Northeast Rand 233, and Johannesburg-Observatory 502; in 1979, the last two were both absorbed by Johannesburg North, where Northeast Rand's Rev. P. de V. Mellet and Johannesburg-Observatory's Rev. F. J. du Plessis together served 992 confirmed members. Membership dropped to 590 in 1985, 350 in 1990, and 231 in 1995 (when there were no pastors left).

Meanwhile, the Andrew Murray Congregation, founded in 1966 to minister to Jews, was searching for a place of worship. The congregation had long used the old Belgravia Reformed Church building in Jeppestown South but was leery of the neighborhood and set the 1999 merger agreement to use the Johannesburg North church. In 1999, the merged church had 161 confirmed members who spoke Afrikaans versus 536 English-speakers. Language numbers later ceased to be used, but overall membership rose to 845 in 2005 only to fall to 718 in 2010 and 589 in 2011. By 2014, it had stabilized to 590.

== Name change ==
In January 2012, the Kerkbode reported the church council's November 22, 2011 decision to abandon the “Johannesburg North” portion of its name to simply become the “Andrew Murray Reformed Church.”

== Pastors: Johannesburg North ==
- Jacobus Johannes Odendaal, 1943 - 1946 (first pastor, left for Jeppestown).
- Adriaan Johan Victor (Attie) Burger, 1947 - 1955 (afterward Johannesburg-Oos en from 1957 - 1970 full-time editor of Die Voorligter).
- Pieter Combrink, 1955 - 1958 (afterward Algoa Park until 1960 and then first pastor of Northeast Rand).
- Frederik Simon Marincowitz, 1958 - 1964 (afterward Pietermaritzburg North until 1969 and then King William's Town North until retirement January 26, 1986).
- Christian Johan Barnard, 1964 - 1967 (left the ministry).
- Marthinus Hendrik van der Merwe, 1967 - 1976.
- Francois Johannes du Plessis, 1978 - 1981 (with the incorporation of Johannesburg-Observatory).
- Johannes Christoffel Jansen, 1981 - 1985 (retired).
- Erich Dürr Botha, 1987 - 1989.
- Pieter de Villiers Mellet, 1978 - 1994 (with the incorporation of Northeast Rand, afterward retired).

== Pastors: Northeast Rand ==
- Pieter Combrink, 1960 - 1962.
- Dr. Coenraad Frederik Bekker, 1962 - 1967.
- Paul de Villiers Mellet, 1967 - 1978 (later Johannesburg North).

== Pastors: Johannesburg: Observatory ==
- Hendrik Johannes Christoffel Snijders, 1964 - 1974 (left Johannesburg East for the job; died in office).
- Francois Johannes du Plessis, September 19, 1975 - 1978 (with Johannesburg North until 1981)

== Pastors: Andrew Murray Congregation ==
- Petrus Arnoldus Pienaar, 1969.
- Claudio Antonio Batista Marra, 1973 - 1977 (from the ministry).
- Didimu de Freitas, 1975 - 1977 (Vanderbijlpark ward, from the ministry).
- Jacobus Stefanus Minnaar, 1977 - 1978.
- Dr. Gerhardus Jacobus Swart, November 12, 1967 to July 31, 1989 (retired, earlier active in ministering to Jews, from whence Andrew Murray originated in 1966).
- Johannes Cornelius Symington, 1990 - 2004 (editor of Kerklike Tydskrifte).
- Prof. Gert Jacobus Steyn, 1997 - 2003 (originally joint with Johannesburg North).

== Pastors: Johannesburg North/Andrew Murray Congregation ==
- Johannes Cornelius Symington, 1995 - 2004 (from 1995 in combination and since 1999 in the united congregation).
- Prof. Gert Jacobus Steyn, 1997 - 2003 (originally in combination, later united).
- Pieter Barendse Bosch, 2001 - 2004 (associated with MES - see Johannesburg East).
- Gerhardus Johannes (Gerhard) Koen, 2002 - 2009 (retired, but continued as pastoral help).
- Gert Andries (Andre) Agenbag, 2004 - 2009.
- Jacobus Petrus Lodewicus van Straaten, 2006–present (chaplain: South African Police Force, earlier pastor of Kempton Park Reformed Church (NGK))
- Lindsay Rudolf (Rudi) Swanepoel, 2009–2024.
- Carli Hugo (ne Benade) 2024 - Present
- Dr. André Bartlett, 2013–present (president of the Centre for Ministry Development at the University of Pretoria).

== Sources ==
- Olivier, Rev. P.L. (compiler) (1952). Ons gemeentelike feesalbum. Cape Town/Pretoria: N.G. Kerk-uitgewers.
- Pistor, Sebastian (2003). Gé Korsten: Portrait of a Tenor. Cape Town: Disa Publishers.
- Smit, Rev. A.P. (1948). Ons Kerk in die Goudstad (1887 - 1947). Cape Town: Church councils of Johannesburg, Fordsburg, Johannesburg East, and Jeppestown.
- Swanepoel, F. (2008). "Burger, Adriaan Johan Victor (Attie)." Gaum, Frits (chief ed.). Christelike Kernensiklopedie. Wellington: Lux Verbi.BM.
