= Johan Hendrik Greijbe =

Afrikaans educationist and chairman of the Afrikaner Broederbond

Chairman of the Afrikaner Broederbond
- In office 1925–1928
- Preceded by: Nicol, W.
- Succeeded by: Potgieter, J.W.

Personal details
- Born: April 26, 1890 Graaff-Reinet, Cape Province, South Africa
- Died: August 23, 1966 (aged 76) Benoni, Transvaal, South Africa
- Spouse: Johanna Jacoba Loubser
- Education: University of the Witwatersrand
- Known for: Afrikaans Educationist and the Afrikaner Broederbond

Johan Hendrik Greijbe (26 April 1890 – 23 August 1966) was an Afrikaans educationist and chairman of the Afrikaner Broederbond.

== Personal life and education ==
Greijbe was born in Graaff-Reinet, Cape Province, South Africa, on April 26, 1890. He was the son of Pieter Jacobus Greijbe and Elsie Magdalena van Heerden. He studied at the Heidelberg Teachers’ Training College and later at the Johannesburg Teachers’ Training College for his diploma. He completed his BA degree at the University of the Witwatersrand in Johannesburg, married Johanna Jacoba Loubser and died on 23 August 1966 in Benoni, Transvaal, South Africa.

== Work career ==
In 1919, he was appointed as the Headmaster of the Afrikaans Secondary School in Benoni, where he held the position until 1949. During his time as Headmaster, the school's name changed twice: once in 1925 to Benoni Afrikaans Secondary School and again in 1929 to its current name, Brandwag High School. He also served as a Director of Volkskas Bank limited, a commercial bank. He was chairman of the Afrikaner Broederbond from 1925 to 1928, which was at the time a secret association. In 1927, he was the first Afrikaans town Councillor in Benoni. Representing the National Party, he was subsequently elected Member of the Provincial Council in 1949. He was the Provincial leader of Die Voortrekkers, an organization similar to the boy scouts as well as a founding member of the organization and was also Chairman of the Transvaalse Onderwysersvereniging (Transvaal Teacher's Association).

== Proponent of white-only education in South Africa ==
Greijbe made a proposal in April 1942 to the Nursery School Association of South Africa, that membership should be limited to white South Africans only. He spoke on behalf of the Federale Raad van Suid Afrikaanse Onderwysersverenigings (Federal Board of South African Teachers’ Associations) of which he was a delegate. The proposal was rejected. As Chairman of the Transvaalse Onderwysvereniging (T.O.), he managed to obtain the cooperation of the three Afrikaans sister churches: the Reformed Church, the Dutch Reformed Church and the "Hervormde" Church. The T.O. also obtained support from the Suid-Afrikaanse Vroue Federasie (South African Women's Federation) and the Federasie van Afrikaanse Kultuurverenigings (Federation of Afrikaans Cultural Societies). Together they founded an Afrikaans nursery school association, known as the Transvaalse Vereniging vir Kleuteropvoeding (Transvaal Association for Nursery Education). He also promoted Christian National Education, an education program for white children and students, based on Christian principles.

== Recognition ==
A school in Germiston was named after him: the Johan Greijbe School. This school subsequently merged with two other schools, the A.J. Koen School and the Maria van Riebeeck School to form Oosterkruin Primary.
