= Doornfontein =

- Location within Gauteng Location within South Africa Location within Africa
- Coordinates: 26°11′S 28°03′E
- Country: South Africa
- Province: Gauteng
- Municipality: City of Johannesburg
- Main Place: Johannesburg

Area
  - Total: 0.46 km^{2} (0.18 sq mi)

Population (2011)
  - Total: 4,484
  - Density: 9,700/km^{2} (25,000/sq mi)

Racial makeup (2011)
  - Black African: 97.2%
  - Coloured: 1.1%
  - Indian/Asian: 0.4%
  - White: 1.2%
  - Other: 0.1%

First languages (2011)
  - Zulu: 34.1%
  - English: 18.7%
  - Northern Sotho: 8.5%
  - Southern Ndebele: 6.7%
  - Other: 32.0%
- Time zone: UTC+2 (SAST)
- Postal code (street): 2094
- PO box: 2028

Doornfontein (/ˈdʊərnfɒnteɪn/ DOORN-fon-tayn) is an inner-city suburb of Johannesburg, South Africa, located to the east of the city centre. It is in Region F of the City of Johannesburg Metropolitan Municipality. In the 1930s, it attracted many Jewish immigrants, becoming the main hub for the city's Jewish community. Black African residents, then a minority in the suburb, lived in slum-yards. Under the Slums Clearance Act 1934, the slum-yards were cleared and many residents were relocated to Orlando, Soweto. Since the late 1970s, Doornfontein and other inner-city suburbs of Johannesburg have underdone high levels of white flight to the city's northern suburbs.

== History ==
The area, whose name means "thorn fountain", was originally the southern part of a farm owned by Frederick Jacobus Bezuidenhout, and was proclaimed a public diggings after the discovery of gold on the Witwatersrand in 1886. The suburb was laid out in the late 1880s by Thomas Yeo, and became the first residential suburb of Johannesburg. In 1897 the freehold of the suburb was bought by the Johannesburg Consolidated Investment Company (JCI), owned by the mining magnate Barney Barnato. The suburb (and Berea) were developed by the company and the district became known as "Millionaire's Row". The JCI also built Norman House, a striking mansion home for Barnato. The property was situated near to the Irene Church with its front entrance on End Street. In his biography of Barnato, Harry Raymond wrote that "as a practical proof of his faith in the permanency of the Gold Fields of the Rand he decided to build a large home for his own dwelling place and tenders were called for its erection." Afterwards the house was the residence of the mining magnate, John Dale Lace. It was subsequently converted into an institution known as Dale Lace house, a residence for senior citizens. The building has since been demolished.

Following the Anglo-Boer War, many of the wealthier residents moved north to Parktown, and Doornfontein, or "Doorie", became home to many Jewish immigrants. In Doornfontein and New Doornfontein, there were nine synagogues, several Talmud Torah and Cheder schools, as well as Jewish organisations. Yiddish was widely spoken and there was a predominantly Eastern European Jewish character and identification with both Zionism and Yiddishkeit. Many of the Jewish residents came from Ferreirasdorp and Marshalltown. Doornfontein Synagogue was completed in 1906 and remains in use. The synagogue has been documented and photographed by David Goldblatt.

During the Great Depression large parts of Doornfontein were bought up by property speculators and turned into slum housing or "yards". These areas were cleared in the mid-1930s and became light industrial manufacturing areas.

In 1967, Adam Leslie, a Jewish theatrical personality took over a small theatre on End Street that had been designed by Sir Herbert Baker for Lady Farrar, wife of Sir George Farrar. The building had previously housed the South African College of Music, with a foundation stone laid in 1906. Leslie converted the building into a music hall with 200 seats and hosted musical revues. The music hall closed after Leslie sold the building in 1975 due to personal health issues. Mannie Manim, co-founder of the Market Theatre was responsible for transforming an old Doornfontein house into the Arena Theatre. At the Arena, Manim formed a theatrical group, The Company with Danny Keogh, Barney Simon, Vanessa Cooke and Janice Honeyman. The theatre was eventually demolished as the Technikon Witwatersrand expanded.

== Features ==
Large areas of Doornfontein are now occupied by the Technikon Witwatersrand, which is now a part of the University of Johannesburg, Ellis Park Stadium and Johannesburg (Athletics) Stadium. The Johannesburg meeting house of the Religious Society of Friends (Quakers) has been situated at 3 Gordon Terrace since the late 1950s. The area had undergone substantial transport renewal in 2008 in preparation for the 2010 FIFA World Cup in soccer, especially the introduction of a key route of the new rapid transit bus system.

== Gallery ==
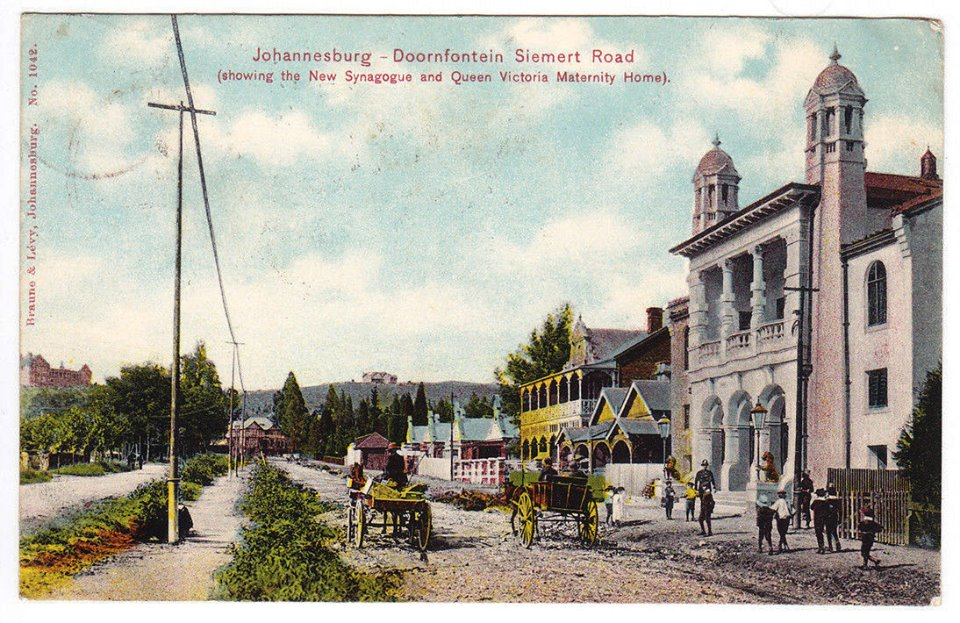
Doornfontein Synagogue and Victoria Maternity Home on Siemert Road

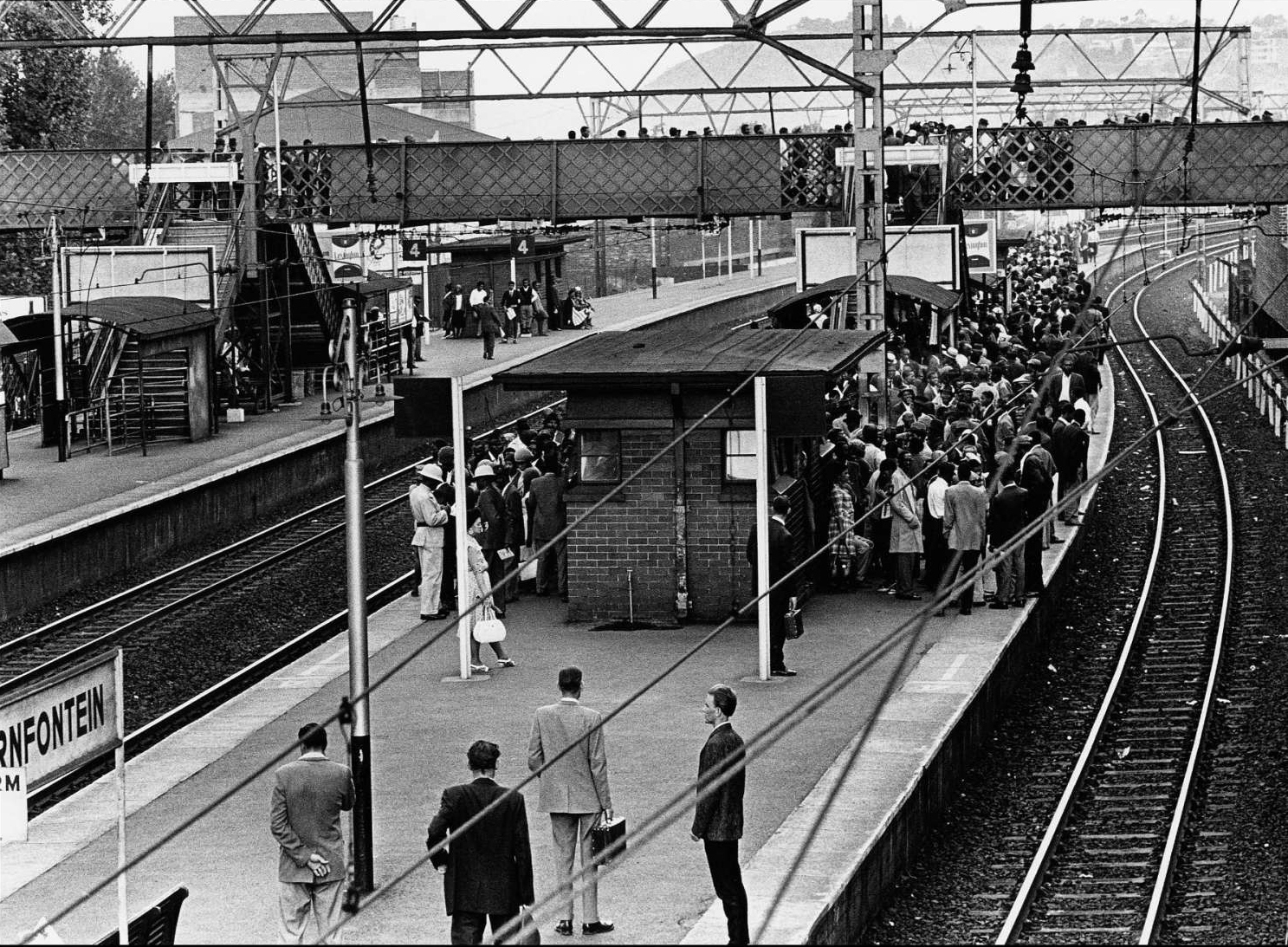
Doornfontein train station in 1967

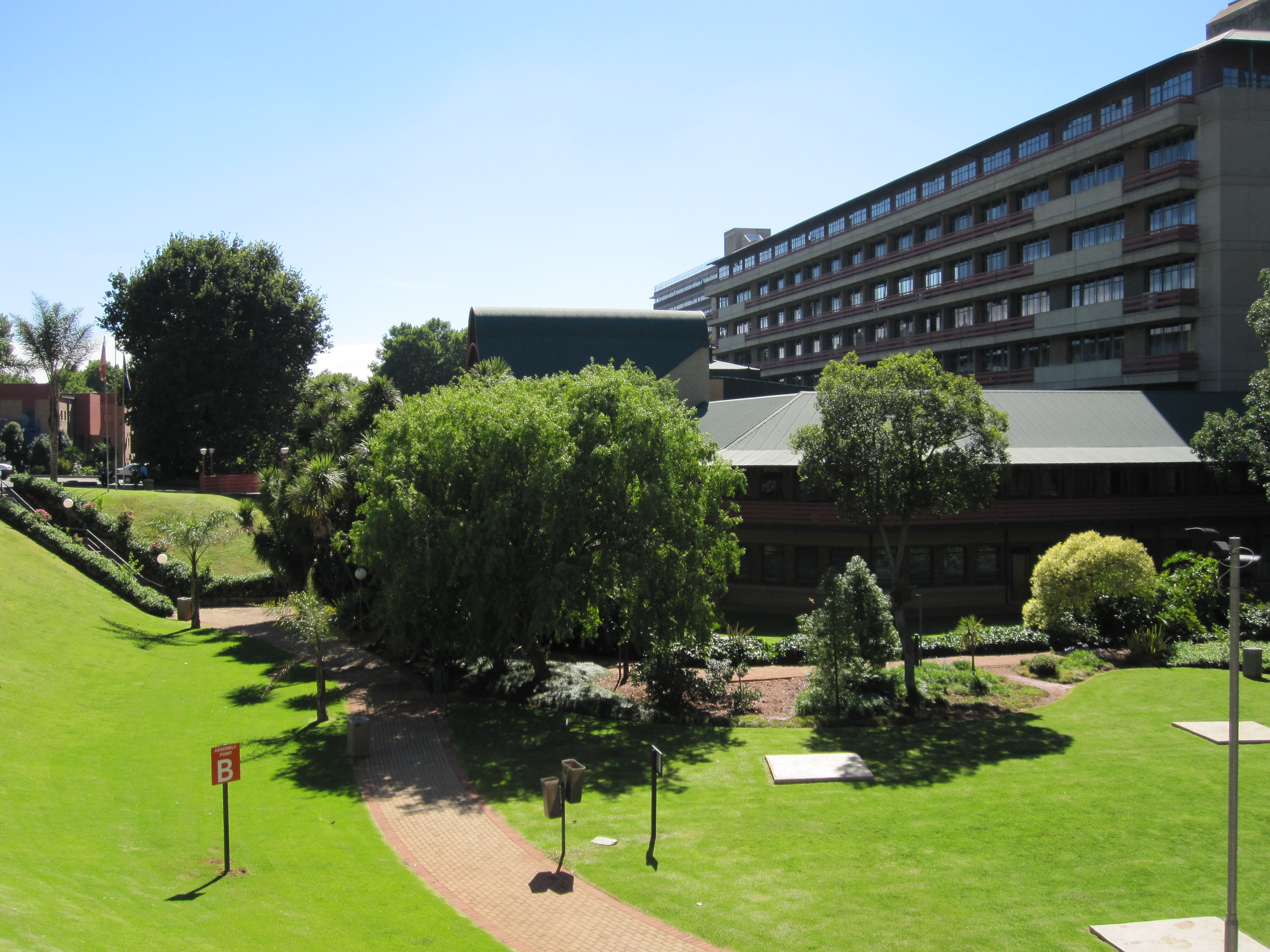
University of Johannesburg Doornfontein campus

== See also ==
- Braamfontein
- New Doornfontein
