= Fordsburg Reformed Church =

Missionary in Johannesburg and Fordsburg

The Fordsburg Reformed Church was a congregation of the Dutch Reformed Church in South Africa (NGK) that served the western Johannesburg suburb of Fordsburg from November 6, 1896, to 1988.

== Background ==
The Cape Colony Vrouesendingbond (VSB, or Women's Missionary Society) was founded in 1889 in Wellington. In 1893, the first VSB deputies led by Mrs. Maria Kloppers arrived in Johannesburg and Fordsburg, where they ministered to the poor Afrikaners living in the "Brickyards" outside of town who made bricks for the growing city's buildings. The workers often had to clean the houses before serious conversation could be had with the residents. Mrs. Abbie Park Ferguson, who arrived in 1895 among by then five VSB volunteers, noted a significant workload including home visits, prayer hours, Sunday school, and children's rosaries, to say nothing of healing and helping the poor while helping them find employment.

Kloppers later wrote that "in Johannesburg, Afrikaners' fortunes first began to decline." The suburban slums introduced a poor white population (named in Afrikaans armblankes, armlastiges, or later minderbevoorregtes) that the state would subsidize at the cost of hundreds of thousands of Rands. In Fordsburg, where rents were low but wages likewise and food costs expensive, the poorest of this growing underclass lived, including blacks and Cape Coloureds as well as whites. Kloppers adopted many orphans and raised them in an orphanage that would later bear her name in Observatory.

== Disaster ==
Fordsburg seceded from the Langlaagte Reformed Church in 1896 with Rev. Abraham Kriel as consulent. Shortly before, he had arranged funds for building a small but elegant church in the neighborhood, which had opened in December 1895. He considered it one of the best congregations on the Rand.

On the afternoon of Wednesday, February 19, 1896, the Braamfontein Explosion occurred in nearby Braamfontein, in which a dynamite wagon destined for the mine exploded after three days sitting in the sun. The resulting four-story-deep crater leveled houses in Vrededorp, Fordsburg, and surrounding areas and severely damaged others.

Kloppers had just arrived in the new church to prepare for three o'clock prayers when she heard a great shock and "the roof sank on me. I struggle to get out. It is a wonder that anyone could come out alive. The doors and beams stuck out under the floor. Someone called out 'Mrs. Kloppers, are you alive! Ah, come here!' Destruction, lament, weep, wail!"

Corpses lay around, some maimed beyond recognition, and some of the injured were similarly wounded but able to recognize relatives. A row of heads of children and adults laid visible in the school, including a class of the VSB Sunday School. Two-year-old Francina was found a day later playing with a bucket under the remains of a stove. She was the first of thirteen children the VSB adopted to start their orphanage.

Soon, the Revs. Marthinus Daneel and Pieter Gerhardus Jacobus Meiring arrived in the area to set up a mess hall for the injured. The Rev. Kriel established the new congregation's cemetery by burying 127 bodies on its first day. Coffins, ten of which only contained partial remains, were carried on mules. Dozens died of their injuries, and a funeral procession wound its way to the cemetery. The Rev. Kriel wept the next day in the study of the Rev. J.N. Martins of Johannesburg.

== First church built ==
The new Fordsburg church was among the razed buildings in Fordsburg, and while it was in use two months later, only the walls remained. A gable was split in half, doors and windows were crushed, and the roof collapsed into the walls. The impoverished residents could scarcely repair their own homes, let alone the church. A tent was set up for prayer nearby, where many sought divine intervention and looked for their loved ones. Local homes were converted into makeshift hospitals.

The Rev. Kriel, however, set about fundraising for reconstruction immediately, quickly raising £32,000 from his donor list. He bought travel tickets to help people reach family elsewhere. The consulent sought funds not only in Johannesburg proper but also as far as Harrismith, where he collected in the church of an old friend, requesting that the organist refrain from playing so he could explain the disaster in detail to the parishioners. The collection drive was a success and the church was built, continuing to serve the congregation until Sunday, April 28, 1940, when the congregation left for Mayfair.

== Vrededorp secession ==
Worshipers from Vrdedorp and Brixton began agitating in church council meetings for their own district or curate as early as the tenure of Rev. J.S. Marais (pastor of Fordsburg, 1920–1925). The council was recalcitrant despite the overtures of the secretaryof the Johannesburg Ring (sub-synod), telling the representative that "the council of Fordsburg refuses to give up a single member of its congregation" (February 1922 meeting notes).

The Ring considered the Fordsburg congregation unwieldy and insisted at least on a curate, who would prove difficult to recruit and maintain, as a Rev. Venter who stayed for just three months in 1924 proved. Several months later, the council secured rev. D.J.J. Roussouw for the post, but left after only six months. When the Rev. Marais was replaced by the Rev. J.C. Pauw, the Ring once again presented a growing consensus throughout the Transvaal NGK Synod that a thousand members per pastor was an ideal ratio, clearly justifying a curate or secession in this case.

At the 1926 Ring Conference in Waterval, a Fordsburg census of 1,500-1,600 members led the Ring Committee to condemn the Fordsburg council's refusal to procure help. After the Committee spoke once more with the council that October, the council agreed to separate its part of Vrededorp given their experience with curates. The Fordsburg council offered to have the Vrederus Reformed Church do the same with its slice of that suburb, which thus released the adjacent territories on August 26, 1927, as the Vrededorp congregation (later Cottesloe). Vrederus was renamed Melville to avoid confusion.

== Fordsburg refuses further secession ==
No sooner had Vrededorp seceded when the Ring Committee reiterated its judgment of the congregation as too large for a single pastor and therefore requiring further secession. The Fordsburg council felt the Committee was too hasty, and the Fordsburg secretary replied that "the recent secession led to the council bestowing £7 10 s. a month for two years on the new Vrededorp congregation. Before that matter is resolved, the council cannot proceed with further division" (church council notes, April 1928).

Two years later, once that subsidy was paid out, the Ring Committee again approached the Fordsburg council pleading for at least a Brixton curate. Eventually, in March 1931, proponent D.S. Lubbe came to fill that role, but he left scarcely a month later, and the council "decided that no more curates would be sought at this time" (council notes, May 1931). After two years, elder P.C.N. Jooste declared "that the congregation had grown too large for only one pastor...and that the time had come for part of it to be served by a curate" (council notes, October 1933).

== Property purchase in Brixton ==
Despairing of ever finding a curate who would stay, the council came around to the idea of allowing a Brixton congregation to secede. Therefore, the council purchased the Brixton Freemasons' hall in 1935 for £775. Although originally intended more for office hours, sales, and Sunday school in the district than for worship services, the purchase led to talk of Brixton and Mayfair West seceding at the council meetings. In February 1937, the council set up a special commission to examine the issue.

== Brixton's final secession ==
At the April 27, 1937, council meeting, the commission reported 855 members living in Brixton and Mayfair West and recommended these wards be let go. The council agreed, negotiated the new boundaries, and at next month's meeting awarded the Brixton hall and £750 to the prospective congregation. However, Rev. Pauw became gravely ill, delaying further consideration of the move.

After Rev. Pauw's death in November 1937, the council resumed their work and elder De Kock submitted the plans to the Ring Committee for releasing Brixton, Mayfair West, and Crosby. The council also agreed to postpone searching for a new pastor for themselves until the splits were complete. After the Langlaagte council agreed to donate land between St. Fillans Avenue and St. Gotthard Street to the new congregation, the Ring Committee declared Brixton its own church on April 20, 1938.

== Hall and parsonage in Mayfair ==
Seeing heavy growth towards Mayfair, the church council already decided in April 1927 to buy eight plots of land in that district. The August 1928 council meeting agreed to have Rev. Pauw run a special committee to investigate building a new meeting hall and parsonage on those plots, and the committee's October report suggested an estimated cost of £1,200 for the church and £2,000 for the parsonage. The council approved the project on November 13.

The contractor, Labuschagne, began laying foundations in May 1929, and the inaugural celebrations were held on November 16 of that year. The cost was £1,275 before factoring in the sewage system built the following year, which raised the total to £4,056. The parsonage was then leased out to the verger so that the Rev. and Mrs. Pauw could settle into their new home.

== Final move from Fordsburg to Mayfair ==
The Rev. Pauw died on November 14, 1937, in Johannesburg General Hospital and was buried two days later in the church where he had preached for a dozen years. The church was full to the point that loudspeakers were needed to broadcast the funeral to the surrounding crowd. A procession of 280 cars and two municipal busses accompanied his hearse to the Brixton cemetery where he was buried in the presence of 19 pastors.

During the ensuing vacancy until May 1938, proponent C.J. Herold served the congregation. On April 23 of that year, proponent J.J. Louw was hired to be invested on June 30 by the consulent, Rev. J.D. van Nieker of Langlaagte, as the fifth pastor of Fordsburg. The Rev. Louw's tenure would be the shortest yet, since he would leave for a post in Springs on March 30, 1941.

The highlight of the Rev. Louw's tenure was the building of a new church near the hall and parsonage in Mayfair. Even before 1920, the council had begun inveighing in racially charged terms against a "fast-moving Indian invasion" in Fordsburg. The church was "surrounded by Asians on all sides" in the 1930s, as the sharpening rhetoric of the times put it.

Still loaded with £2,000 worth of debt from the new Mayfair buildings, the council postponed an elder's proposal to move in June 1934. In October 1937, however, the issue was raised again and a committee appointed, but the committee recommended that the issue should await the investiture of the late Rev. Pauw's replacement.

Immediately after the Rev. Louw's ordination, the council started a construction fund. The first order of business was selling the old church and parsonage in Fordsburg, which earned more than £5,000 but caused further problems. When the South African Republic's Executive Council deeded the land to the Langlaagte congregation on May 31, 1895, it was under the condition that the council could sell the building if it was found unfit but could only put the proceeds toward building one in the same municipality. This would seem to preclude building one in Mayfair.

The Regirstrar of Deeds informed the church council that the Executive Council's decision would first need to be amended. The church council would obtain this amendment in time to sell the old parsonage and church in Fordsburg in June 1939 and build the new one in Mayfair for £10,000.

== New church built ==
The building committee was started that month and was chaired by Rev. Louw. They accepted bids for a blueprint by architects Geers & Geers, won by contractor George Beckett in January 1940.

The Rev. Louw laid the cornerstone of the new church on 4th Avenue on March 2, 1940, surrounded by around 250 dignitaries including Rev. Pauw's widow and prominent pastors and city council members. He sermonized for the occasion on Joshua 24:27: "Joshua said to all the people, 'See, this stone shall be a witness against us." After the sermon, the Rev. Louw offered £60 to pay for the stone.

The church building opened on Monday, April 29, 1940. Prof. Rev. D.J. Keet of the University of Pretoria Department of Theology gave the consecration speech for an edifice with 600 pews that cost £7,712 6s. 6d. including the organ, bell, furniture, etc.

The elderly members in particular bid a fond farewell to the old church and parsonage on Central Road in Fordsburg that served the congregation for over 40 years. An official evening farewell was held there on Sunday, April 28, the day before the new one's consecration, along with the last communion in the old church. Despite poor weather, the building was full, and the Rev. A.P. Smit recalls: "the atmosphere was gloomy. Even cheerful choruses could not lighten the mood. More than one tear was shed silently, especially when the choir poignantly, earnestly sung the hymn Moet ek gaan met leë hande ("Must I Go Empty-Handed") at the end of the service. Thus the old church and parsonage were sold, eventually to be razed and replaced with businesses.

== Later developments ==
The Mayfair Reformed Church (in the southern portion of the suburb) seceded from Fordsburg in 1953, but was re-absorbed into the mother church in the 1970s. The Fordsburg congregatio's name was changed in the 1980s to Goudstad ("Gold City" a common name for Johannesburg as a whole), but in 1988 it was absorbed by Langlaagte, which was thus renamed Goudlaagte. Later, Langlaagte returned to its original name despite consisting of three congregations in one, until it was absorbed by a fellow triune church, the Vergesig Reformed Church (which would later absorb the Crosby West Reformed Church as well). After the 1988 merger, the old Fordsburg tower church was converted into the headquarters of the Muslim Sultan Bahu Centre. Very few NGK worshipers remain in the portion of Vergesig that was once the Fordsburg congregation.

== Location ==
The final Fordsburg church, now a mosque, was located on 44 4th Avenue in Fordsburg.

== Daughter churches ==
- Melville (1920)
- Cottesloe (1927, also including part of Melville)
- Brixton (1938)
- Mayfair (1953)

== Pastors ==
- Daniël Theron, 1897–1914 (first pastor)
- Barend Frederik van der Merwe, 1915–1920
- Johannes Stephanus Marais, 1920–1925
- Jacobus Cornelis Pauw, 1925 – November 13, 1937 (died in office)
- Jacobus Johannes Louw, 1938–1941
- Francois Gerhardus Badenhorst, 1941–1948
- Isak Johannes Haasbroek, 1947–1950
- Johannes Nicolaas Botha, 1950 – January 4, 1976 (retirement)
- Saakie van den Heever, 1951–1953 (first pastor of Mayfair)
- Johannes Stefanus Krige, December 4, 1977 – 1982 (later in Auckland Park and since 1995 in Johannesburg congregation)
- Theo Swart, 1982–1984 (became a lecturer in Islamic Studies at Rand Afrikaans University)
- Christo Naudé, 1984–1988 (final pastor)

== Sources ==
- Hofmeyr, F. (1950). Brandhout uit die vuur. Bloemfontein: Die Sondagskool-Boekhandel.
- Kestell, J.D. (1932). Abraham Paul Kriel – sy lewe en werk. Langlaagte: Die Abraham Kriel-Kinderhuis.
- Smit, Rev. A.P. (1948). Ons Kerk in die Goudstad (1887–1947). Cape Town: Church Councils of Johannesburg, Fordsburg, Johannesburg East, and Jeppestown.
- Stals, Prof. Dr. E.L.P. (ed.) (1986). Afrikaners in die Goudstad, deel 2, 1924–1961. Pretoria: HAUM Opvoedkundige Uitgewery.
- Van Wijk, Mrs. A.J. (compiler) (1964). Vroue-Sendingbond Kaapland na vyf-en-sewentig jaar 1889–1964. Cape Town: Die Hoofbestuur van die Vroue-Sendingbond.
