= Waterval Estate =

- Location within Gauteng Location within South Africa
- Coordinates: 26.1504°S 27.9791°E
- Country: South Africa
- Province: Gauteng
- Municipality: City of Johannesburg
- Main Place: Johannesburg
- Established: 1903

Area
  - Total: 1.72 km^{2} (0.66 sq mi)

Population (2011)
  - Total: 2,826
  - Density: 1,640/km^{2} (4,260/sq mi)

Racial makeup (2011)
  - Black African: 21.0%
  - Coloured: 3.6%
  - Indian/Asian: 6.3%
  - White: 67.6%
  - Other: 1.5%

First languages (2011)
  - English: 50.8%
  - Afrikaans: 31.4%
  - Zulu: 4.5%
  - Xhosa: 2.9%
  - Other: 10.4%
- Time zone: UTC+2 (SAST)

Waterval Estate is a suburb of Johannesburg, South Africa. It is located in Region B of the City of Johannesburg Metropolitan Municipality.

== History ==
Prior to the discovery of gold on the Witwatersrand in 1886, the suburb lay on land on one of the original farms called Waterval. It became a suburb in 1903 and takes its name from the original farm name.
