= New Doornfontein =

- Location within Gauteng Location within South Africa
- Coordinates: 26.198°S 28.061°E
- Country: South Africa
- Province: Gauteng
- Municipality: City of Johannesburg
- Main Place: Johannesburg

Area
  - Total: 0.89 km^{2} (0.34 sq mi)

Population (2011)
  - Total: 2,022
  - Density: 2,300/km^{2} (5,900/sq mi)

Racial makeup (2011)
  - Black African: 97.6%
  - Coloured: 0.5%
  - Indian/Asian: 1.8%
  - White: 0.1%

First languages (2011)
  - Zulu: 26.7%
  - English: 20.9%
  - Xhosa: 13.3%
  - Northern Sotho: 9.7%
  - Other: 29.4%
- Time zone: UTC+2 (SAST)
- Postal code (street): 2094

New Doornfontein (/ˈdʊərnfɒnteɪn/ DOORN-fon-tayn) is a suburb of Johannesburg, South Africa. It is located in Region F of the City of Johannesburg Metropolitan Municipality.
