= Vrededorp, Gauteng =

Vrededorp
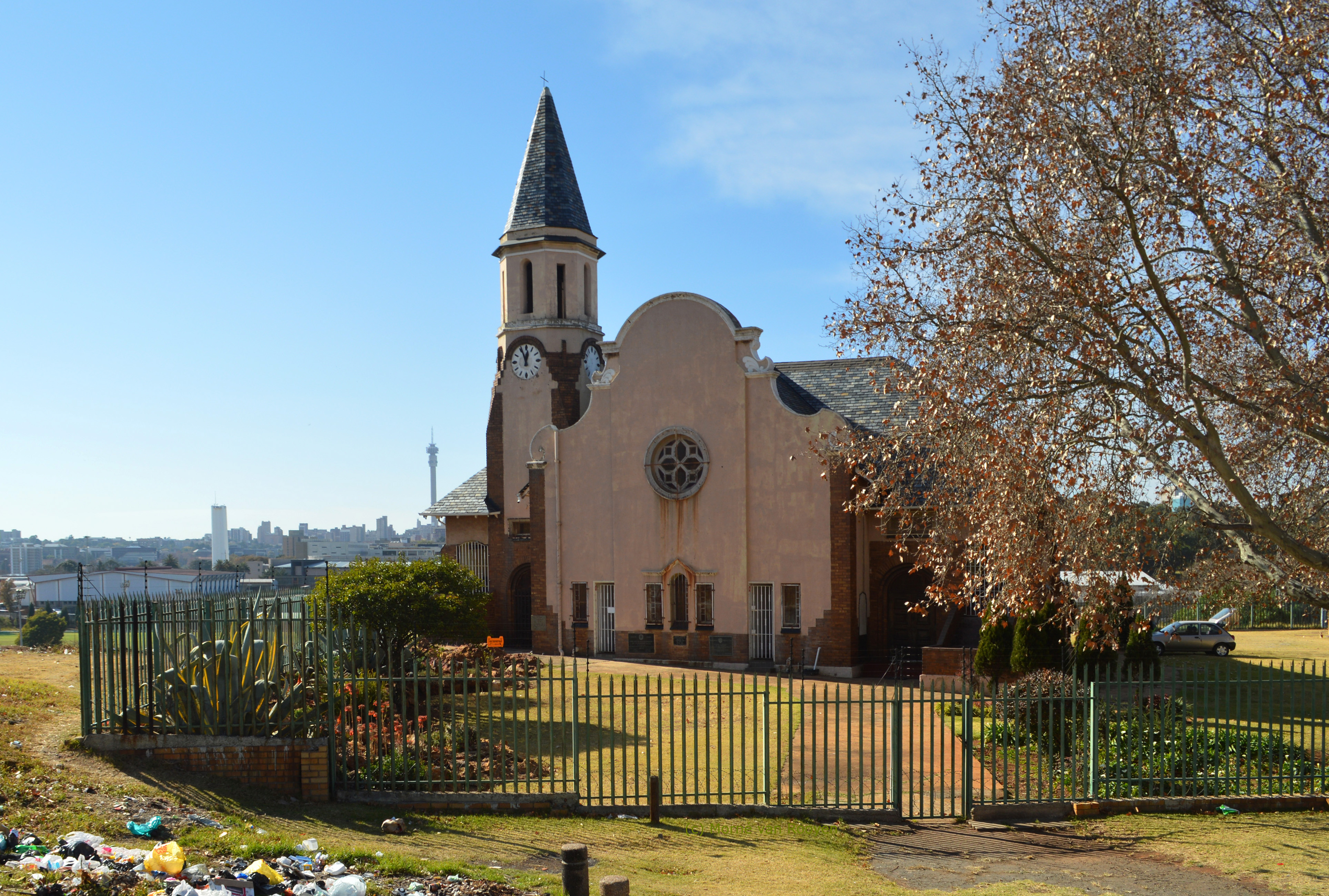
- Nederduitsch Hervormde Church, Vrededorp, with the Hillbrow Tower and city center of Johannesburg in the back

- Location within Gauteng Location within South Africa
- Coordinates: 26.194°S 28.017°E
- Country: South Africa
- Province: Gauteng
- Municipality: City of Johannesburg
- Main Place: Johannesburg
- Elevation: 1,764 m (5,787 ft)
- Time zone: UTC+2 (SAST)
- Postal code (street): 2092
- PO box: 2141

Vrededorp is a suburb of Johannesburg, South Africa. It is located in Region F of the City of Johannesburg Metropolitan Municipality. Vrededorp is situated on the North-Western side of Johannesburg and is 1,764 m (5,788 ft) above sea level.

The adjacent suburb of Pageview, along with the part of Vrededorp populated by non-whites, south of 11th Street, were commonly and onomatopoeically known as "Fietas" after the Men's Outfitters that traded from 14th street in Vrededorp - hence "Fitters" and "Fittas" or, as commonly spelled, "Fietas". The then well-known 14th street was the area's business lane where everybody from across Johannesburg met to snatch up bargains. Most shopkeepers stayed in apartments on top of their shops.

Vrededorp is sometimes incorrectly regarded as being synonymous with Fietas, however, the bulk of Vrededorp (unlike Pageview) was always a white area, and not a part of Fietas.

== History ==
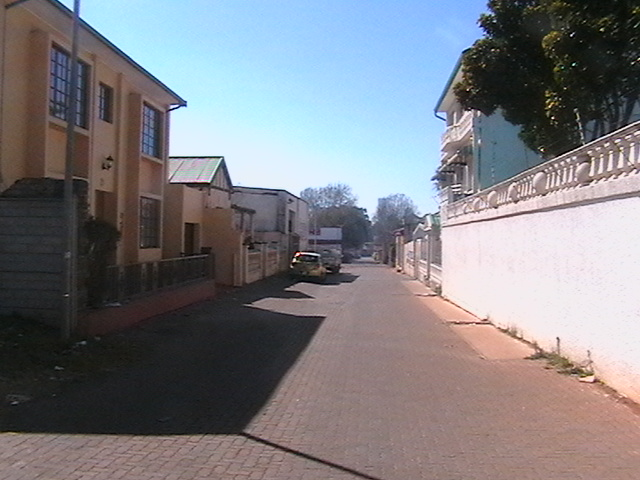
14th Street as it looks like today

Vrededorp ("Village of Peace"), was named as such in 1895 because of the decision taken to give poor people squatter rights in the area. The idea was that these rights could later be transferred to the heirs of the people that were granted initial squatter rights. After the Anglo Boer War (11 Oct 1899- 31 May 1902), the British did away with the arrangement.

On 19 February 1896 Vrededorp, Braamfontein, Fordsburg and the Malay Location (later renamed Pageview) were flattened as a result of a huge explosion caused by a locomotive that reversed into two railway trucks that contained 1955 tons of unstable dynamite. This explosion is commonly known as the "Great Dynamite Explosion".

The area was never truly multiracial, as whites lived north of 11th Street, while Coloureds, Malays, and Indians lived in the area south of that street, and in adjacent Pageview, which together constituted Fietas.

The Apartheid Government declared Vrededorp and Pageview as a white area in 1962. Subsequently, the area was cleared of non-whites by the 1970s. Many homes were bulldozed, and housing for white people was built on some of the land, with large parts remaining undeveloped. Some buildings, such as the '23rd Street Mosque', remain.

To date no land claims were settled in the area. Due to the uncertainty around the land claims the suburb is in a state of gross neglect. The settling of land claims is complicated further by the number of claims lodged. The problem is that there are more claims than there are properties in the area.
