= William Nicol (Transvaal) =

Dutch Reformed minister and colonial governor

Governor of Transvaal Province
- In office 1 November 1948 – 31 October 1958
- Preceded by: Jacobus Johannes Pienaar
- Succeeded by: Fox Odendaal

Chairman of the Afrikaner Broederbond
- In office 1924–1925
- Preceded by: Klopper, H.J.
- Succeeded by: Greybe, J.H.

Personal details
- Born: 23 March 1887 Robertson, Cape Colony
- Died: 22 June 1967 (aged 80) Pretoria, South Africa
- Party: National
- Children: 9
- Education: Stellenbosch University; Vrije Universiteit Amsterdam; Princeton University

Rev Dr. William Nicol (23 March 1887, in Robertson – 22 June 1967) was a Dutch Reformed minister, theologian, educator and Administrator of the Transvaal Province of South Africa.

== Life ==
In 1906, he obtained his bachelor's degree at Stellenbosch University and then studied at the Free University of Amsterdam and Princeton. From 1913 to 1938 he was a minister of the Dutch Reformed Church in Johannesburg East, called Irene Church. In June 1938, he became a minister in Pretoria East. From 1934 to 1948 he was the moderator of the Dutch Reformed Synod of the Transvaal. In Johannesburg, he was a champion for the recognition of the Afrikaans language and the establishment of Afrikaans-medium schools.

Nicol was the founder of Johannesburg East's parish magazine, Irenenuus, in January 1923, that he wanted the members in their particular situation escorted to their faith. It was written in Afrikaans in a time when the language just started gaining a foothold in schools and was rarely heard from the pulpit. Nicol in August 1923 (date uncertain) made history when he wrote the first sermon in Afrikaans broadcast on the radio directly into the radio studios in downtown Johannesburg. At 9:45 on Sunday, 7 June 1924, the minister and church made history when full service was held in Afrikaans for the first time. He also broadcast on the Union broadcast and from Irene Hall. A month later, on 4 October 1925, the first communion service was broadcast from Irene Hall led by Nicol. He was the second chairman of the Afrikaner Broederbond from 1924–1925.

On 1 November 1948 he was elected as the administrator of Transvaal and ten years later his work, especially with regard to education and culture, continued to grow. He retired on 1 October 1958.

Nicol believed in teaching education in the person's mother tongue and said any education taught in a second language would hinder a person's growth and learning ability. Thus he also helped translate the Bible with help from African religious leaders into Zulu. He opposed the National Party's Bantu Education and suggested a model with learning in the mother tongue with English as a second language so that people could all communicate.

== Legacy ==
A number of roads in South Africa were named after Nicol, most notably William Nicol Drive (which constitutes the M81 road and part of the R511 road) in the northern suburbs of Johannesburg. On 26 September 2023, this road in the Johannesburg Municipality was renamed to Winnie Mandela Drive. This resulted in controversy, with the Afrikanerbond, a successor of the Broederbond criticising the ruling party, the ANC, for attempting to rewrite history.

Nicol is considered as one of the architects of apartheid and co-authored a book, 'Regverdige Rasse-Apartheid', which translates as Just Racial Apartheid, which calls for the creation of Apartheid with attempts at religious justifications.

== Works ==
Book

- Regverdige Rasse-Apartheid. Stellenbosch: CSV-Boekhandel, 1947. (co-author with E.P. Groenewald and G. Cronjé).
