= Johannesburg East Reformed Church (NGK) =

Former South African church

The Johannesburg East Reformed Church was a congregation of the Dutch Reformed Church in South Africa (NGK) in the Johannesburg suburb of Doornfontein, just east of downtown. It is also known as the Irene Church after the sobriquet of its second and third churches on 1 Beit Street. Five weeks before its centennial (July 8, 1997), on June 1, 1997, Johannesburg East was absorbed by the Johannesburg Reformed Church (NGK), from whence it had seceded on July 8, 1897.

In 1913 William Nicol became pastor.

== Sources ==
- Albertyn, J.R. (chairman) (1947). Kerk en stad. Stellenbosch: Pro Ecclesia-Boekhandel.
- Bulpin, T.V. (2001). Discovering Southern Africa. Cape Town: Discovering Southern Africa Publications cc.
- Dreyer, Rev. A. (1924). Eeuwfeest-Album van de Nederduits Gereformeerde-Kerk in Zuid-Afrika 1824–1924. Cape Town: Publikatie-kommissie van de Z.A. Bijbelvereniging.
- Hofmeyr, George (chief ed.) (2002). NG Kerk 350. Wellington: Lux Verbi.BM.
- Minutes of the Fourth Conference of the South Transvaal Synod of the NGK, Pretoria, March 26–27, 1963.
- Olivier, Rev. P.L.(compiler) (1952). Ons gemeentelike feesalbum. Cape Town/Pretoria: N.G. Kerk-uitgewers.
- Smit, Rev. A.P. (1948). Ons Kerk in die Goudstad (1887–1947). Cape Town: Church councils of Johannesburg, Fordsburg, Johannesburg East, and Jeppestown.
- Stals, Prof. Dr. E.L.P. (ed.) (1986). Afrikaners in die Goudstad: vol. 2. 1924–1961. Pretoria: HAUM Opvoedkundige Uitgewery.
