= Berea, Gauteng =

Berea
- Location within Gauteng Location within South Africa
- Coordinates: 26.185°S 28.053°E
- Country: South Africa
- Province: Gauteng
- Municipality: City of Johannesburg
- Main Place: Johannesburg
- Established: 1893

Area
  - Total: 1.01 km^{2} (0.39 sq mi)

Population (2011)
  - Total: 42,801
  - Density: 42,400/km^{2} (110,000/sq mi)

Racial makeup (2011)
  - Black African: 97.1%
  - Coloured: 0.9%
  - Indian/Asian: 0.9%
  - White: 0.7%
  - Other: 0.4%

First languages (2011)
  - Zulu: 32.9%
  - Southern Ndebele: 18.7%
  - English: 13.0%
  - Northern Sotho: 5.0%
  - Other: 30.4%
- Time zone: UTC+2 (SAST)
- Postal code (street): 2198

Berea is an inner city neighbourhood of Johannesburg, in the South African province of Gauteng. It is east and adjacent to the Johannesburg CBD. It is located in Region F of the City of Johannesburg Metropolitan Municipality.

It is located in between Yeoville and Hillbrow to the east and west respectively. It was designated as a "white" area during apartheid, under the Group Areas Act. For much of the twentieth century it was a middle-class Jewish area. In the years preceding and after the repeal of the Group Areas Act in 1991, white residents had begun to migrate to the northern suburbs. The neighbourhood has been home to mostly black Africans since the 1990s. It became notorious for high levels of crime and population density. There have been attempts to regenerate the area.

== History ==
The suburb is situated on part of an old Witwatersrand farm called Doornfontein. It was established in 1893 and is named after Berea, Durban. Harold Le Roith was one of several architects that contributed to the neighbourhood's urban landscape. He built the modernist apartment buildings, Mount Sheridan, Anlar and Marlene Mansions. Marlene was featured in Britain's influential The Architectural Review magazine in 1953.

The Johannesburg High School for Girls opened in Berea in 1897, serving white girls. The school faced closure in 1989 due to falling enrollment amid white applicants and the government’s continued support for segregated education. However, the school re-opened in 1990 as Barnato Park High School, a non-racial school.

In 1975, Ponte City was built in Berea, making it the tallest residential skyscraper in Africa. At the time it was a very sought after address in Johannesburg. Amid migration trends of white flight and the arrival of undocumented African immigrants, the building became prone to gangs and violent crime. In recent years the building has been regenerated, tours are held and students and middle-class city workers are among the tenants.

=== Jewish community ===
For much of the twentieth century, the area was home to a significant Jewish community. Berea Shul was consecrated in 1968. A year earlier, the shul commissioned Herman Wald to design and create a sculpture. From sheet copper, Wald designed a large pair of wings. They were installed above the ark and surrounded a plaque of the Ten Commandments. Rabbi Morris Swift, a prominent advocate of halachic law, also served the congregation for a time. Colin Tatz, who would later become a prominent public intellectual in Australia, was born and raised in Berea. He had his Bar Mitzvah at Berea Shul, and later married his wife there. Tatz had lived on Honey Street, where the doctor Sydney Cohen, father of writer Roger Cohen, was born and raised.

The neighbourhood was also home to the Etz Chaim Shul. As most Jewish residents eventually migrated to the northern suburbs, the synagogues were de-consecrated and the old Berea Shul building now houses a church.

Barney Barnato, the Jewish diamond magnate, built an impressive mansion in Barnato Park in Berea. The mansion was later used by Johannesburg School for Girls, before being demolished in 1963.

The Jewish photographer David Goldblatt also took apartheid-era photos in Berea.

In 1902, Corona Lodge was built as a Masonic Society Lodge. The Lodge later fell out of use and was then used by the local Jewish community. The lodge was used by the precursor to the Yeshiva College of South Africa, which was established in 1953. The Yeshiva Katanah divided classes between Corona Lodge and the Beth Hamedrash Hagadol in Doornfontein. Afternoon classes were held at the lodge under the supervision of Rabbi Michel Kossowsky, an Eastern European Talmudic scholar who had settled in South Africa during the Holocaust, and Rabbi Baruch Rabinowitz. The subjects the rabbis taught classes around Talmud, Mishnah, Prophets, Laws and Customs and Ethics of Judaism.
