= Going to Tehran =

American nonfiction book by Flynt Leverett

Going to Tehran : Why the United States Must Come to Terms with the Islamic Republic of Iran
- First edition
- Editor: Henry Holt and Company Inc
- Authors: Flynt Leverett and Hillary Mann Leverett
- Language: English
- Published: December 2013, Picador
- Pages: 496
- ISBN: 978-1250043535

Going to Tehran: Why the United States Must Come to Terms with the Islamic Republic (Persian: عزیمت به تهران) is a book by Flynt Leverett, former senior fellow at the New America Foundation in Washington, D.C., and his wife Hillary Mann Leverett. It was first published in 2013. The premise of Going to Tehran is that the United States must move beyond static demonization and develop its relationship with Iran in a similar manner to that of its relationship with China in the early 1970s at the time of Nixon and Kissinger.

== Authors ==
Flynt Leverett (born March 6, 1958, in Memphis, Tennessee) is a former senior fellow at the New America Foundation in Washington, D.C. and a professor at the Pennsylvania State University School of International Affairs. His wife Hillary Mann Leverett is a visiting scholar at Georgetown University and Peking University, and a senior fellow at the Chongyang Institute for Financial Studies at Renmin University of China. Both authors are former American national security officials.

== Context ==
According to Gareth Porter: "The central message of "Going to Tehran" is that the United States has been unwilling to let go of the demand for Iran’s subordination to dominant U.S. power in the region." Analyzing "the roots of the legitimacy of the Islamic regime," the Leveretts "point to evidence that the single most important factor that swept the Khomeini movement into power in 1979 was the Shah’s indifference to the religious sensibilities of Iranians. That point, which conflicts with just about everything that has appeared in the mass media on Iran for decades, certainly has far-reaching analytical significance."

== Reviews ==
According to The New York Times, the authors of Going to Tehran take an obviously partisan stance, challenging the perspective of the US toward Iran with regard to both foreign affairs and internal policy. According to the concluding pages, the issues between Iran and America cannot be resolved by isolating, strangling, bombarding, dislodging or waiting for Iran to fall. The American government must consider the Islamic Republic of Iran a strategic partner and both countries have to reach an agreement on controversial issues. At the end of the book, the author state by example how political planes create a negative view of Iran.

Danny Postel, reviewing the book in The Cairo Review of Global Affairs, wrote, "[T]he Leveretts get it badly wrong when they go out of their way and expend considerable effort not only to portray the Islamic Republic in the most flattering terms, but to disparage Iranian dissidents and trash the democratic Green Movement."

Roger Cohen, reviewing the book in The New York Review of Books, wrote, "To say the Leveretts are contrarians would be a gross understatement. The brutal crackdown on millions of protesters who took to the streets after the 2009 presidential election was, they argue, 'relatively restrained' — despite the beatings, killings, mass arrests, and institutionalized sodomy that characterized it."

The authors suggest that the United States must develop its relationship with Iran in the same manner it did with the People's Republic of China in the early 1970s at the time of Nixon and Kissinger.

Due to the ideas of the authors, the United States is required to come to an agreement with the Islamic Republic, not to safeguarding the interests of Iran but to stabilize its strategic position in the Middle East and to avoid conflict.

== See also ==
- Manufactured Crisis: The Untold Story of the Iran Nuclear Scare
