= Donald Mackay Park =

Municipal park, South Africa

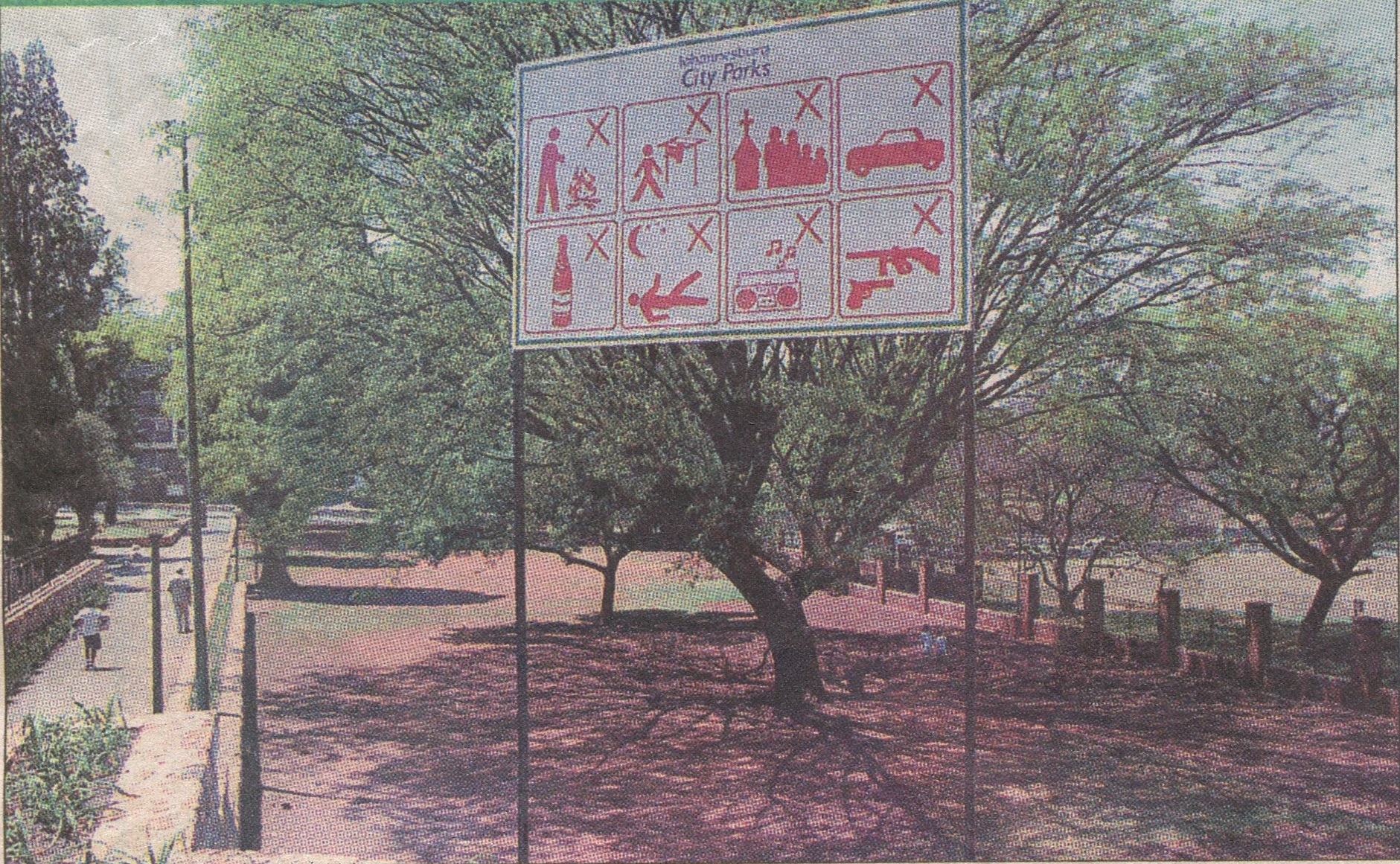
- Donald Mackay Park in Berea, South Africa

Donald Mackay Park is a municipal park in the Berea district of Johannesburg, South Africa. It is located above the reservoir.

== History ==
Donald Mackay Park was built in 1896. The foundation stone of the reservoir was laid by Mrs. Von Brandis, wife of the first magistrate and Mining Commissioner of Johannesburg. The reservoir was designed to hold 227 million liters of water to combat water shortages. The reservoir continues to function.

The park adjacent to the reservoir was formerly known as ‘Andrew’s Reserve’ and ‘Waterworks Reservoir’. Donald Mackay Park was given its current name on January 31, 1939, in honour of Donald William Mackay, mayor of Johannesburg from 1936–37.

Both the reservoir and the park are owned by the City.

== Heritage Status ==
Although it is not officially recognized as a heritage site, Donald Mackay Park is historically and culturally significant for several reasons:

- Donald Mackay Park is associated with Donald Mackay, former mayor of Johannesburg
- Donald Mackay Park is a municipal park for the community and provides local social value
- Donald Mackay Park was built over one hundred years ago

== Gallery ==
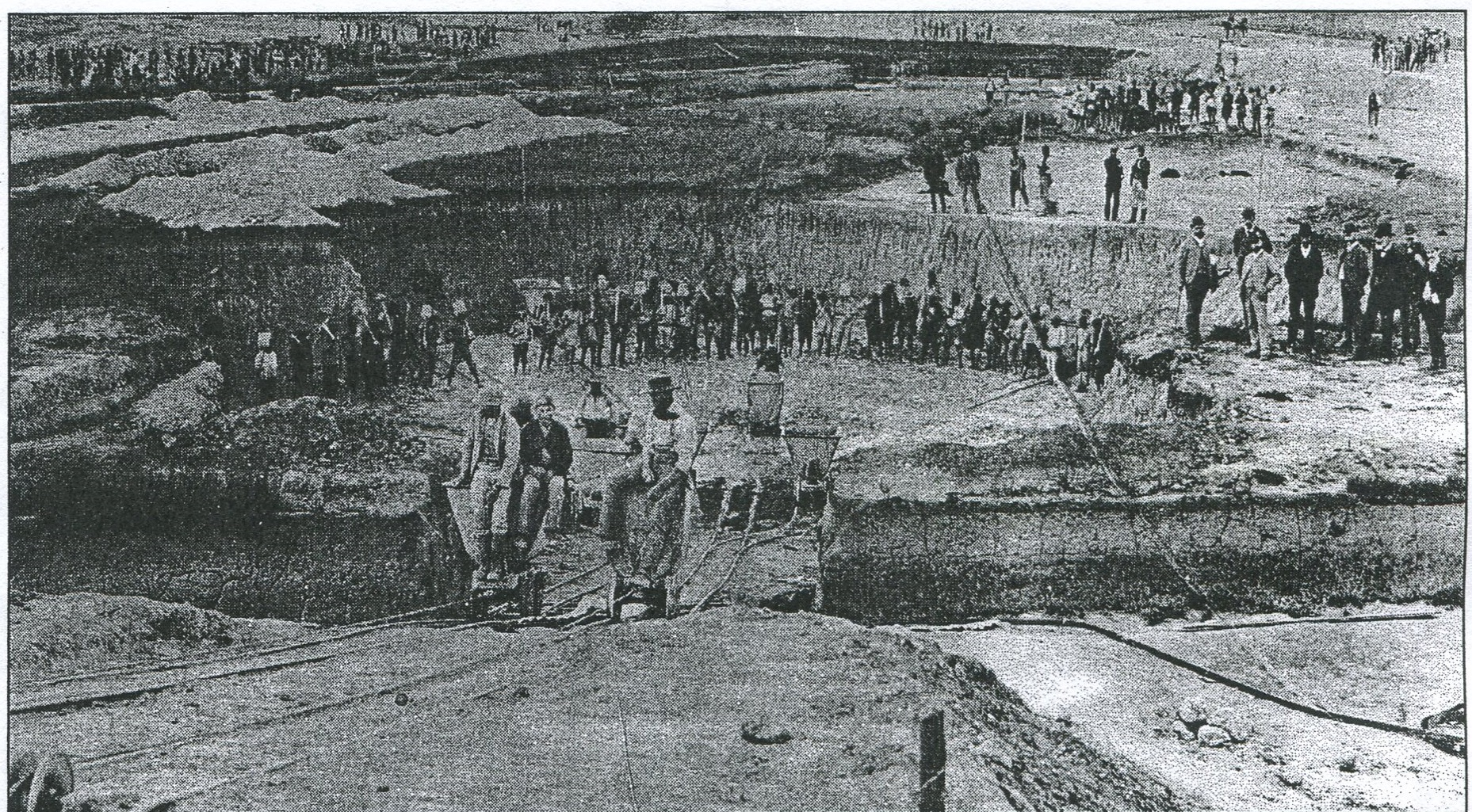
The building of the reservoir

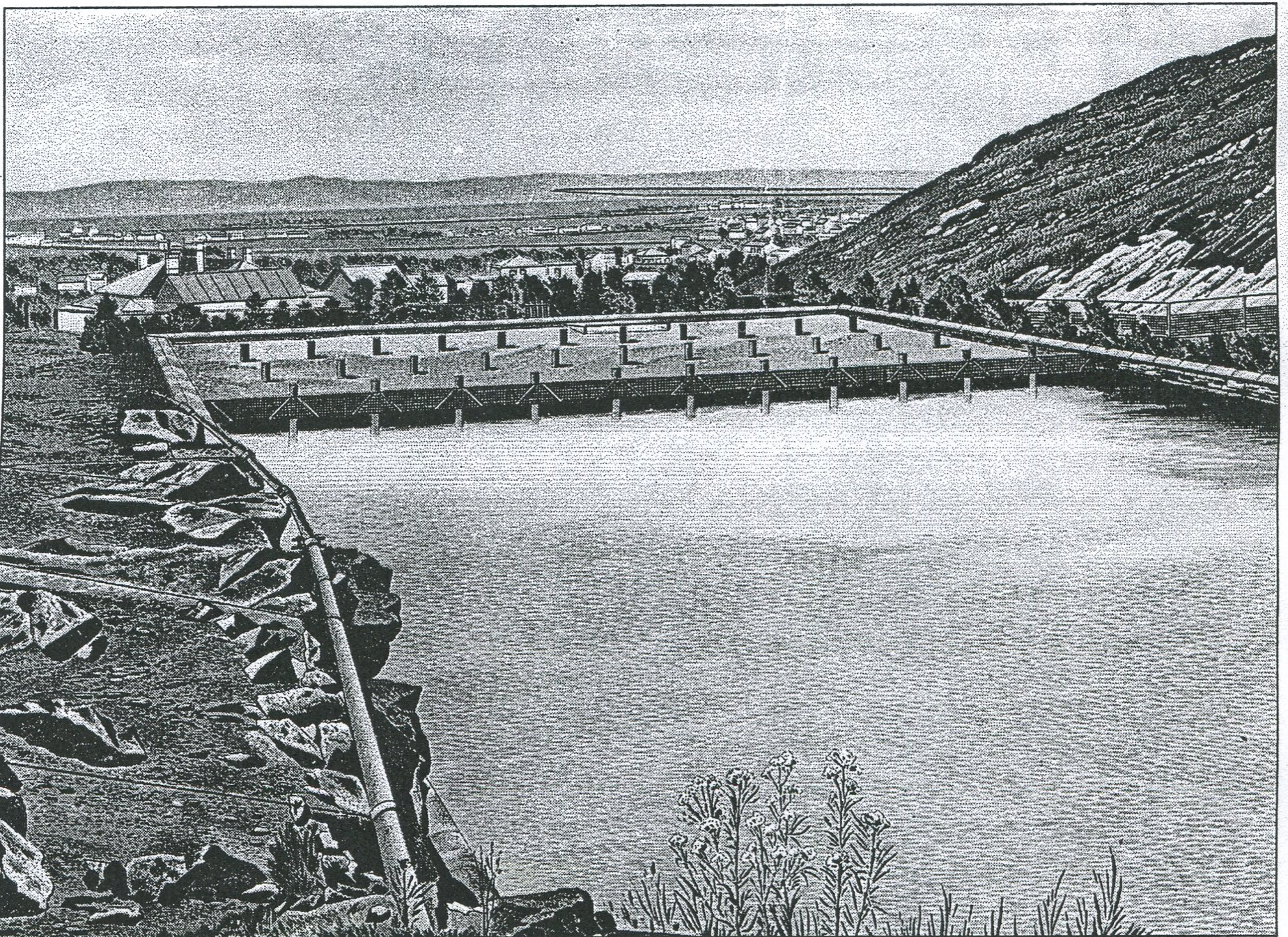
The reservoir nearing its completion

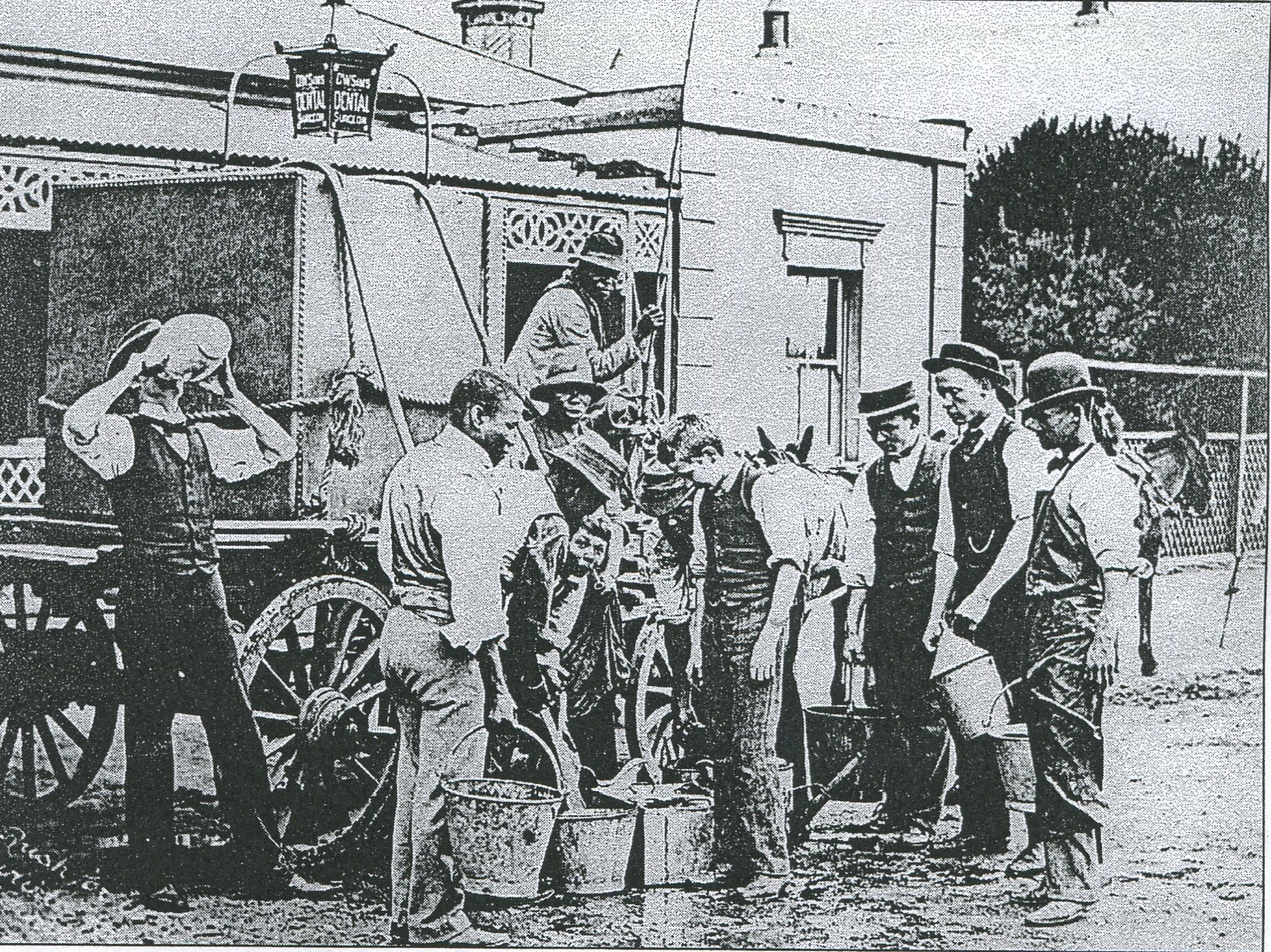
During the water shortage water was provided by donkey and horse carts
