= Ellen Hellmann =

Social anthropologist (1908–1982)

- Born: Ellen Phyllis Kaumheimer; 25 August 1908; Johannesburg
- Died: 6 November 1982 (aged 74); Johannesburg, South Africa
- Occupation: anthropologist

Academic background
- Education: Barnato Park High School
- Alma mater: University of the Witwatersrand
- Thesis: Early school-leaving and occupations of native juveniles in Johannesburg. (1940)

Ellen Hellmann (25 August 1908 – 6 November 1982) was a South African social anthropologist and the first woman to graduate with a D.Phil. degree from the University of Witwatersrand.

== Biography ==
Ellen Phyllis Kaumheimer was born in Johannesburg in 1908 to German Jewish migrant parents, Bernard Kaumheimer and Chlothilde Theilheimer. Her father had arrived in South Africa from Bavaria, Germany in 1894. Hellmann was educated in Barnato Park and Commercial High School. She attended the University of Witwatersrand where, in 1935, she completed her MA thesis with pioneering research into the conditions of the slums of Rooiyard in Doornfontein, Johannesburg. She published this work in Rooiyard: A Sociological Survey Of An Urban Native Slum Yard in 1948. Hellmann graduated with a D.Phil degree in 1940.

Hellmann was a member of the Joint Council of Europeans and Bantu and executive member of the South African Institute of Race Relations. She provided evidence to the 1955 Tomlinson Report and the Cillie Committee in 1976 and 1977 which was the Inquiry into the Riots at Soweto and Elsewhere. Hellmann was the chair of the Isaacson Bursary Fund for Africans. She lectured at the Jan H. Hofmeyr School of Social Work.

Hellmann married Joseph Michael Hellmann in March 1932 and they had one daughter. Her first husband died in 1941, and Hellmann subsequently married Dr. Bodo Koch in 1948. From 1959 to 1971 Hellman was an Executive member of the Progressive Party in South Africa, which she had helped to found. She died in Johannesburg in 1982.

== Works ==
- Problems of Urban Bantu Youth, 1940
- Rooiyard: A Sociological Survey of an Urban African Slum. Johannesburg, 1948
- Handbook on Race Relations in South Africa. Johannesburg, 1949, editor
- Sellgoods: A Sociological Survey of an African Commercial Labor Force. Johannesburg, 1953
- Soweto: Johannesburg’s African City. Johannesburg, 1969

== Honours ==
- 1968 Honorary Doctorate in Law from University of the Witwatersrand
- 1970 the Royal African Society’s medal for “dedicated service to Africa”
