= Lillian Browse =

British art dealer (1906–2005)

Lillian Browse CBE
- Part of a photographic portrait of Lillian Gertrude Browse by Ida Kar, late 1950s; collection of the National Portrait Gallery, London
- Born: Lily Gertie Browse; 21 April 1906; London, England
- Died: 2 December 2005 (aged 99); London
- Occupations: art dealer; art historian
- Spouses: Ivan Joseph; Sidney Lines

Lillian Gertrude Browse CBE (21 April 1906 – 2 December 2005) was a British art dealer and art historian. She was a partner in two London galleries, first Roland, Browse and Delbanco and then Browse & Darby. During the Second World War she organised exhibitions at the National Gallery, whose collections had been removed to the country for safety. She wrote a number of monographs on twentieth-century artists, including important works on Walter Sickert and Sir William Nicholson. She was nicknamed "The Duchess of Cork Street", and used that name as the title of her autobiography.

== Life ==
She was born Lily Gertie Browse at 2 Carlton Mansions, West End Lane, in West Hampstead, London, on 21 April 1906; she subsequently changed her names to Lillian Gertrude. She was the younger child of Michael Browse and his wife Gladys Amy née Meredith. In 1909 the family moved to South Africa, where her father had set up as a racehorse trainer, and she was educated at Barnato Park High School, in Johannesburg in the Transvaal. In 1928 she returned to Britain and trained as a dancer under Margaret Craske at the Cecchetti Ballet School. Instead of becoming a ballet-dancer as she had planned and trained to do, she began in 1931 to work – at first without pay – for Harold Leger of the well-known Leger Galleries in Bond Street. During the Second World War Browse organised a number of exhibitions at the National Gallery, which was empty as the collections had been removed to Aberystwyth for safety. The first of these was British Painting since Whistler in 1940; a retrospective Exhibition of Paintings by Sir William Nicholson and Jack B. Yeats was held in 1942.

In 1945 Browse formed a partnership with Gustav Delbanco (1903–1997) and Henry Roland (1907–1993) and opened Roland, Browse and Delbanco in Cork Street, which at that time was, in Browse's words, a "haunt for prostitutes"; there was at that time only one other gallery in the street, the Redfern. In 1977 the lease of the 19 Cork Street premises fell in and the partnership dissolved. The dealer William Darby took over the lease and with Browse opened a new gallery, Browse & Darby, at the same address. Browse retired in 1981.

In 1983 almost all of her personal art collection was exhibited at the Courtauld Gallery, which at that time was in Woburn Square. She donated more than thirty works to the Courtauld Institute in 1982, and bequeathed a further eight.

Lillian Browse was married twice, first to Ivan Joseph in 1934, and then in 1964 to Sidney Lines. In the 1998 Birthday Honours she was made a Commander of the Order of the British Empire for "services to the visual arts". She died in London on 2 December 2005.

== Published works ==
Her published works include:

- Augustus John: Drawings, with 'A Note on Drawing' by Augustus John. London: Faber & Faber, 1941.
- Sickert, with an essay by Reginald Howard Wilenski. London: Faber & Faber, 1943.
- Camden Town Group CEMA 1944, introduction by Lillian Browse. [London]: Arts Council, [1944].
- Constantin Guys: Flushing 1805 – Paris 1892, introduction by Clifford Hall. [London]: Faber & Faber, 1945.
- James Dickson Innes, introduction by John Fothergill. London: for the Shenval Press, Faber & Faber, 1946.
- Barbara Hepworth, Sculptress, introduction by William Gibson. London: Faber & Faber, 1946.
- Degas dancers. London: Faber & Faber, 1949.
- Leslie Hurry: settings and costumes for Sadler's Wells Ballets. London: Faber and Faber, 1946.
- William Nicholson, with catalogue raisonné of the oil paintings. London: Rupert Hart-Davis, 1956.
- Edgar Degas: Ballet Dancers, introduction by Lillian Browse. London: Folio Society, 1960.
- Sickert. London: Rupert Hart-Davis, 1960.
- James Dickson Innes: Llanelly 1887 – Swanley 1914. [London]: Faber and Faber, 1966.
- Forain, the painter, 1852–1931. London: Elek, 1978.
- The Duchess of Cork Street: the autobiography of an art dealer. London: Giles de la Mare, 1999.
