= Soldiers and Slaves =

Soldiers and Slaves: American POWs Trapped by the Nazis' Final Gamble
- Author: Roger Cohen
- Language: English
- Genre: Non-fiction
- Publisher: Knopf
- Publication date: April 26, 2005
- Publication place: United States
- Media type: Print
- Pages: 320 pages
- ISBN: 978-0-375-41410-7
- OCLC: 56111710
- Dewey Decimal: 940.54/7243/0943184 22
- LC Class: D805.5.B46 C63 2005
- Preceded by: Hearts Grown Brutal

Soldiers and Slaves: American POWs Trapped by the Nazis' Final Gamble is a 2005 history of World War II by New York Times reporter Roger Cohen. It recounts the ordeals suffered by the 350 American prisoners of war shipped into eastern Germany during the winter of 1944–1945.

== Summary ==
Cohen details how the prisoners, many of whom were accused by their Nazi captors of being Jewish, were mixed in with victims of the Holocaust and sent to a concentration camp in Berga.

== Reviews ==
Publishers Weekly stated that "Cohen's level of detail... makes this journalistic history come alive." Author Elie Wiesel stated that "Cohen is to be thanked for revealing to the public its profound human drama with talent, sensitivity, and a commitment to truth."
