= Universidade Santa Úrsula =

Private university in Rio de Janeiro, Brazil

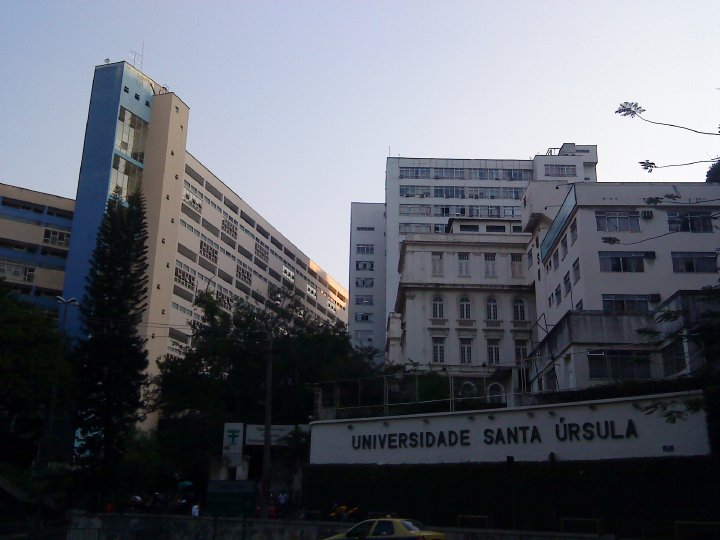
Universidade Santa Úrsula

University Santa Úrsula is a private university (Roman Catholic) in Rio de Janeiro, Brazil.

It was founded in 1937 by Alceu Amoroso Lima. It was the first of Rio de Janeiro's higher education institutions to accept women. The main campus is located on the border of Flamengo, Laranjeiras, and Botafogo neighborhoods.

== Notable alumni ==
- Frida Baranek
- Marcelo Crivella
