= Frida Baranek =

Brazilian sculptor

- Born: 1961 (age 64–65); Rio de Janeiro, Brazil
- Education: Parsons School of Design, New York City, 1984–85; Museu de Arte Moderna and Escola de Artes Visuais, Rio de Janeiro, 1982–84; Universidade Santa Ursula, Rio de Janeiro,1978–83
- Known for: Sculpture
- Website: http://www.fridabaranek.com/

Frida Baranek (born 1961) is a Brazilian sculptor known for creating large sculptural works that incorporate fibers and industrial materials such as plates, rods, and iron or steel wires as commentary on industrialization and the environment in Brazil.

== Biography ==
Frida Baranek was born in Rio de Janeiro. She graduated from Universidade Santa Úrsula, with a bachelor's degree in architecture in 1983, and from Parsons School of Design with a master's degree in sculpture in 1985. She has lived and worked in São Paulo, Paris, Berlin, and New York City. Frida currently live in Miami. She owns one studio in Rio de Janeiro and one in Miami.

== Career ==
She creates organic forms and subjects using inorganic materials e.g., "Untitled," (1985) stone, wood boxes, bulbs and electric wire, and "Como vai você, Geração 80? [How are you, Generation 80?]," (1984), Steel. "Como vai você, Geração 80?" is incorporated into and organic material (water) and it flows throughout the water seamlessly. Sculptures such as "Dormindo em Veneza [Sleeping in Venice]", (1990), "Bolo [Cake]", (1990), and Não classificado [Unclassified], (1992) incorporate puffs of steel wool and sheets of steel that shimmer like constellations.

Others take the form of fences and screens to evoke mass and space e.g. Untitled, (1988) iron flexible, plates and stones and Untitled, (1991) steel rods and wire. Latent references to women's work are also incorporated in her sculptures. The artist also knits and weaves thin thread into womb and bag-like forms like in her sculpture "Swirls Bege," (2008). Baranek's overwhelming tangles and whiskered sacs refer to the sexual symbol of women's hair; this is not only a symbol of inclination, but of danger as well. Other materials used in her sculptures are stones, springs, bars, glass, air chambers, tires, rubber balls, water, sand, etc.

In 1984, in a selected group exhibition called "Como vai você, Geração 80?" at the Escola de Artes Visuais in Rio de Janeiro, Brazil, Baranek created a stained plastic buoy floating in Rodrigo de Freitas Lake. The buoy is similar to the shape of the Dois Irmãos Mountain, that is close to the exhibition and is 0.9 meters wide and 30. meters long. The buoy is surrounded by water. The sculpture's satin surface that is silver reflects light bouncing off the water. Baranek's sculptures reflect a skewed reality, strangeness, and unexpected poetical relationships.

Her works are held by the São Paulo Museum of Modern Art, Museum of Contemporary Art, University of São Paulo, the Kemper Art Museum, and the National Museum of Women in the Arts.

== Family ==
She was married to journalist Roger Cohen and has four children. They divorced in 2015.

== Exhibitions ==
- 1985 Petite Galerie, Rio de Janeiro
- 1988 Galeria Sérgio Millet, Rio de Janeiro
- 1990 Gabinete de Arte Raquel Arnaud, São Paulo
- 1993 Stux Gallery, New York
- 1993 ULTRAMODERN: The Art of Contemporary Brazil, National Museum of Women in the Arts
- 1996 Gabinete de Arte Raquel Arnaud, São Paulo
- 1999 La Maison du Brésil, Brussels
- 2001 Gabinete de Arte Raquel Arnaud, São Paulo
- 2004 HAP Galeria, Rio de Janeiro
- 2006 Frida Baranek - Lavish Pause / Lange Pause, Galerie im Traklhaus, Salzburg
- 2009 Gabinete de Arte Raquel Arnaud, São Paulo, Brazil
- 2013 Museu de Arte Moderna, Rio de Janeiro, Brazi
- 2013 H.A.P. Galeria, Rio de Janeiro, Brazil
- 2014 Gabinete de Arte Raquel Arnaud, São Paulo, Brazil
- 2014 Heike Moras Art, London, UK
- 2017 Untitled Art Fair, Miami, USA
- 2019 "Liminality", Gabinete de Arte Raquel Arnaud, São Paulo, Brasil

== Awards ==
- 1992 Fulbright International Fellowship in the Visual Arts, US
- 1993 Studio Residency, Paris
- 2019 Studio Residency, Miami
- 2019 Women Who Make History, Miami
- 2019 Recipient of the Joan Mitchell Foundation Painters and Sculptors Grants
