= Hearts Grown Brutal =

1998 book by Roger Cohen

- Author: Roger Cohen
- Language: English
- Genre: Non-fiction
- Publisher: Random House
- Publication date: August 25, 1998
- Publication place: United States
- Media type: Print
- Pages: 580 pages
- ISBN: 0-8129-9178-8
- OCLC: 191143091
- Preceded by: In the Eye of the Storm
- Followed by: Soldiers and Slaves

Hearts Grown Brutal: Sagas of Sarajevo is a non-fiction book by New York Times reporter Roger Cohen chronicling his experiences covering the Bosnian War and the Bosnian Genocide. Random House published the book on August 25, 1998. The book won a Citation for Excellence from the Overseas Press Club in 1999.

== Summary ==
Cohen follows the story of a man named Sead who had been searching for his lost father. Cohen goes on to describe the lives of three other families, one Muslim-Serb, one Muslim, and one Serb-Croat. He details the history of Yugoslavia from the end of World War I onward and then shows how the Yugoslav Wars affected the daily lives of ordinary people. He states that, in general, "This was a war of intimate betrayals".

He blasts leaders such as Slobodan Milosevic, whom he calls "a craven, clever bully", Franjo Tuđman, whom he says played a "macabre dance", and Radovan Karadžić. He writes with outrage against the United States and the United Nations for what he sees as their moral cowardice in the wake of genocide.

== Reviews ==
David Rieff in The New York Observer called it a "stunning accomplishment" and stated that Cohen captured "the sense of inconsolable sorrow and stony anger that those who watched as Bosnia was destroyed will carry with us to our graves". Kirkus Reviews praised its "insightful, eloquent journalism" and described the book as "essential reading". Ian Williams in The Nation wrote "Cohen's prose is impassioned and objective at the same time". Library Journal stated that "Among the best journalism of the war, it is highly recommended for all libraries." Favorable reviews also appeared in The New York Times Book Review, Booklist, and Cohen's own paper, The New York Times. Foreign Affairs has written that Cohen's "forceful, elegant prose pulses with anger".

In Mediterranean Quarterly, author Walter R. Roberts gave a critical review, accusing Cohen of a consistent anti-Serb bias. He wrote that Cohen "writes extremely well... and knows how to keep the reader's attention", but he stated that the book contains slanted material and reads more like fiction than non-fiction.

== See also ==
- War crimes in the Bosnian War
- Yugoslav Wars
