= Corona Lodge =

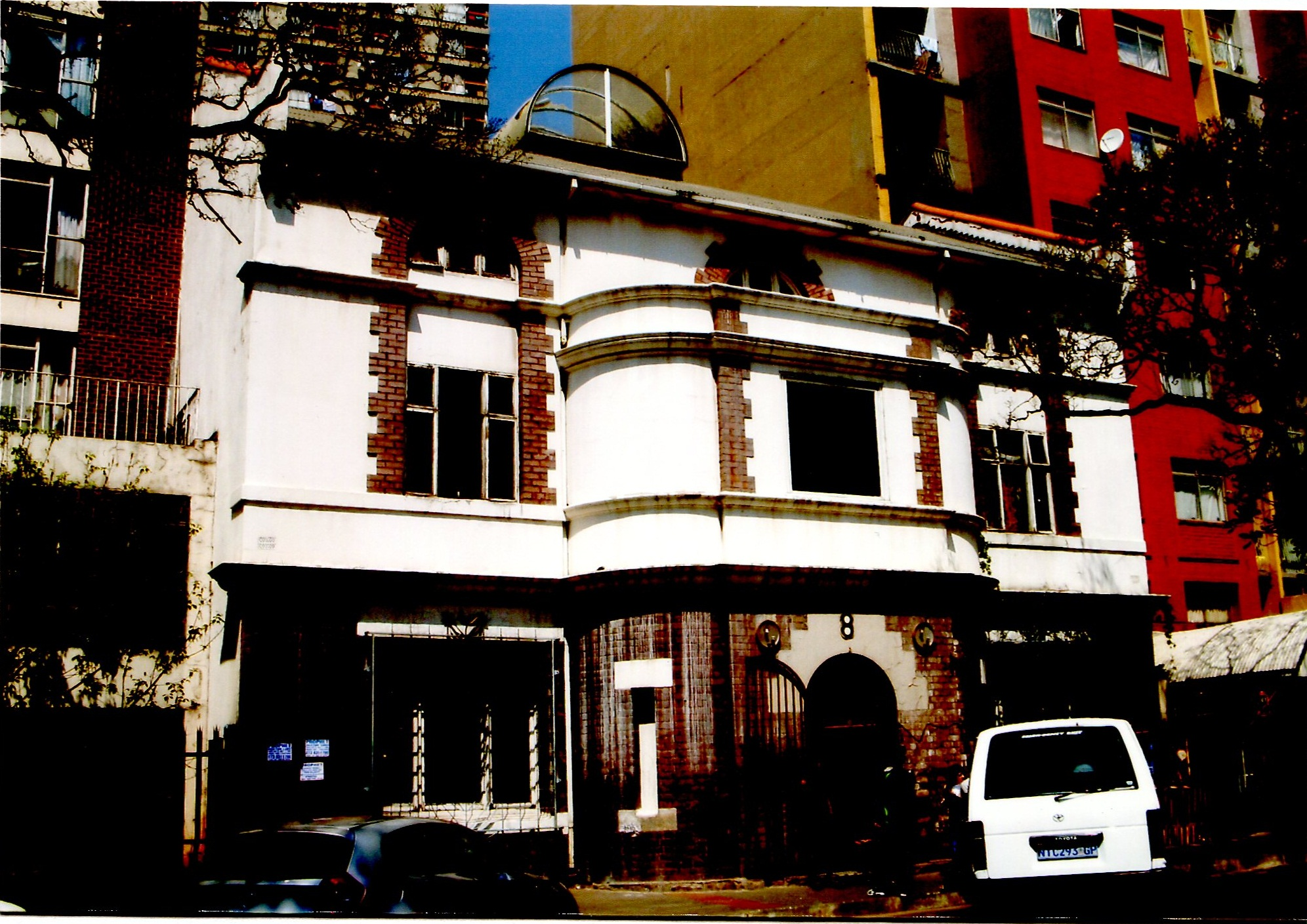
- The corona Lodge in Berea

General information
- Status: Completed
- Type: Residential
- Location: Berea, South Africa
- Coordinates: 26.19035677°S 28.05192729°E
- Completed: 1902

Height
- Roof: 95 metres (312 ft)

Design and construction
- Architect(s): J.A Cope

Corona Lodge was constructed as a Masonic Society Lodge in 1902. It is situated on stand 62 (1494) on O’Reilly Road in the Berea district of Johannesburg. Corona Lodge is one of the few remaining original buildings in this part of the city. The architect of the original building was J A Cope Christie.

== History ==
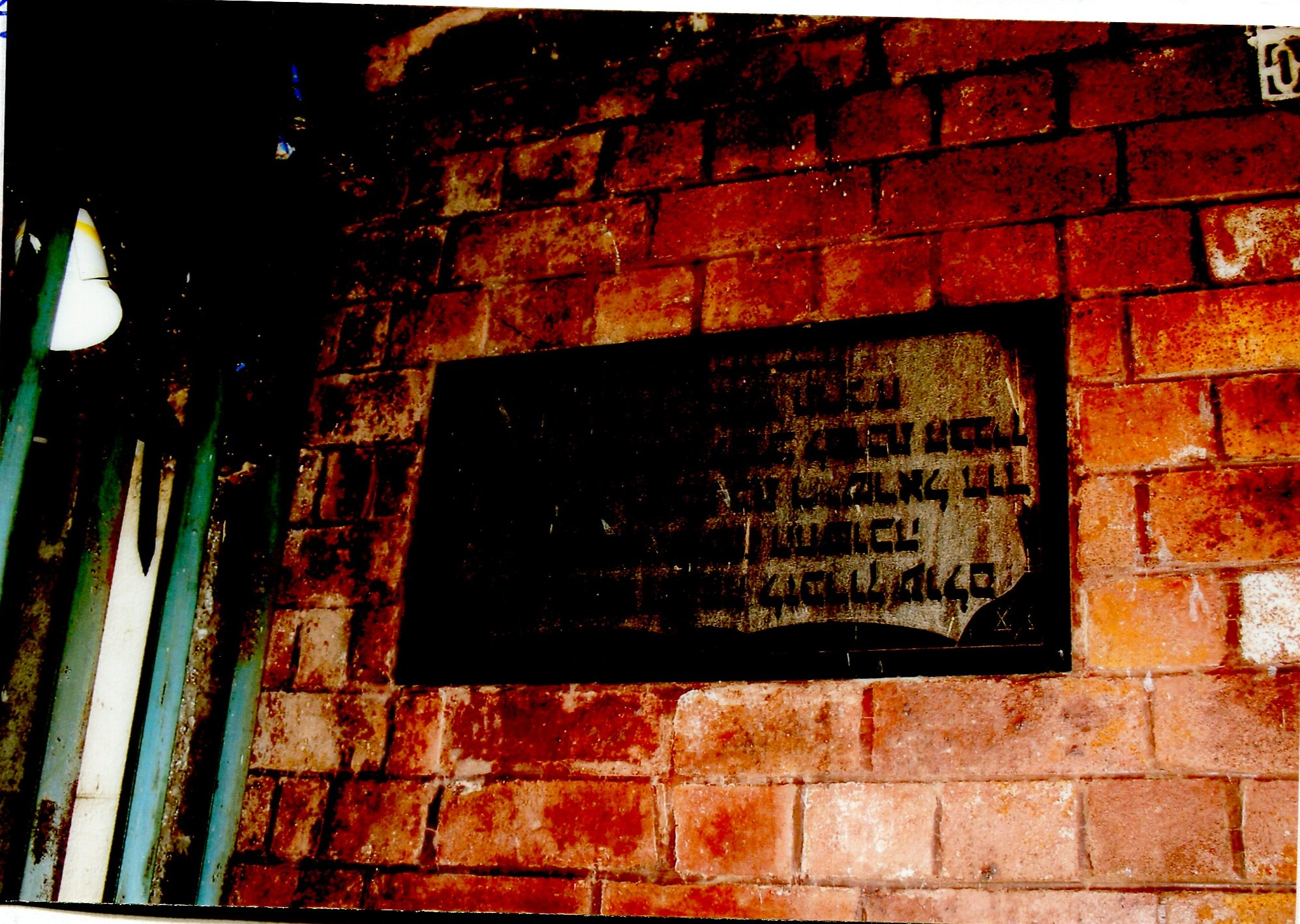
Hebrew text from when the building was used by the Jewish community

The foundation stone of the building was laid by W Bro. S. Sykes W.M. on 1 November 1902.

The Corona Lodge fell out of use around 1920. When Coronoa Lodge was taken over by the Palestine Society in about 1935 it became the meeting place for the Jewish Society and the Jewish community from Palestine who settled in Berea.

The lodge was used by the precursor to the Yeshiva College of South Africa, which was established in 1953. The Yeshiva Katanah divided classes between Corona Lodge and the Beth Hamedrash Hagadol in Doornfontein. Afternoon classes were held at the lodge under the supervision of Rabbi Michel Kossowsky, an Eastern European Talmudic scholar who had settled in South Africa during the Holocaust, and Rabbi Baruch Rabinowitz. The subjects the rabbis taught classes around Talmud, Mishnah, Prophets, Laws and Customs and Ethics of Judaism.

As this community dispersed the building was used no longer as a place of religion.

In 1985, the decision was made that it should be sold and although rights were held for the development of a twenty-storey block of flats, it was proposed to convert the lodge to office accommodation.

== Design ==
The original building comprised a two-storey structure facing onto O’Reilly Road and the single storey lodge was behind this. At some stage the single storey building was razed by fire.

The building is constructed in brown brick with a projecting curved bay to the entrance. The ground floor is in brown brick, whilst the first floor has brown brick surrounds to the windows only with white render between. Stained glass and decorative grilles adorn the windows. Black and white tiles provide an elegant floor to the entrance hall. Other significant features include pressed ceilings, barrel vault skylight and double volume board room.

The adaptation of the building for office use was undertaken by architects Montgomerie Oldfield Kirby Denn Brobbelaar. The architects of the project received an ISAA award of merit for their design solution, which included sensitive conversion and a sympathetic three storey extension to the rear. The interior is a total of 976 square metres.

== Heritage Status ==
The Corona Lodge is historically and culturally significant for the following reasons:

- The Corona Lodge is associated with renowned architect J A Cope Christie
- Corona Lodge is associated with both the Masonic Lodge and the Jewish Community, giving it cultural and social significance
- Corona Lodge has an attractive yet understated facade and has design value
- Corona Lodge is one of very few low rise buildings remaining in the city centre
- Corona Lodge was built in 1902 and so qualifies as a heritage asset on the grounds it has been in existence for sixty years or more
