= Herman Wald =

Sculptor

- Born: July 7, 1906; Kolozsvár
- Died: July 4, 1970 (aged 63); Johannesburg
- Occupation: sculptor

Herman Wald (Kolozsvár, July 7, 1906 – Johannesburg, July 4, 1970) was a sculptor of Jewish origin from Austria-Hungary who worked in South Africa.

== Biography ==
He was born to an orthodox Jewish family in Kolozsvár, modern Cluj-Napoca. His father was Jakab Wald, rabbi, and his mother was the daughter of rabbi Mózes Glasner. His first success was a sculpture made of wood of Tivadar Herzl. He showed it to his father, who did not block his artistic career afterwards. He finished his studies at the Hungarian University of Fine Arts in Budapest, and later he learnt at Wien and Berlin as well. As a result of the fascist ideas in the German-speaking countries, he moved to Paris and later to London, where he taught sculpture studies. His brother, Márk, invited him to the Union of South Africa. He went there and settled in Johannesburg. He founded an artist studio here. He married in 1942 to Vera Rosenbaum, and they had three children (Michael, Pamela, and Louis).

He served in the Army during World War II and travelled to Israel, Rome, Paris and New York for half-year trip in 1952.

== Sculptures ==
His most well-known sculptures are the following ones:

- Kria, Sandringham, 1949
- Memorial of the Six Million, Johannesburg, 1959
- Diamond Diggers, Johannesburg, 1960
- Man and his Soul
- The Unknown Miner
- Impala Fountain

== Sources ==
- Wald Herman-home page
- Jewish Affairs, Pesach 2012

== Further information ==
- Video
- His works
- His open air works
