= Sydney Cohen =

British chemist and pathologist (1921–2017)

Sydney Cohen CBE FRS (18 September 1921 – 25 July 2017) was Professor of Chemical Pathology, Guy's Hospital Medical School, and an authority on malaria.

== Biography ==
Sydney Cohen was born on 18 September 1921 in Johannesburg to Pauline (née Soloveychik) and Morris Cohen, Jewish immigrants from Lithuania.

He was educated at King Edward VII School, Johannesburg, and at Witwatersrand University, graduating MB BCh in 1944. In 1945 he sailed to the UK and worked at the Royal Berkshire Hospital, treating the war injured. He travelled back and forth to South Africa for the next decade, gaining his MD at Wits in 1954. That same year he left South Africa to join the National Institute for Medical Research, Mill Hill, where “in a very productive six-year period he carried out basic studies on the metabolism of plasma proteins in rabbits, baboons and humans.” Cohen gained his PhD from the University of London, in 1959.

He moved to St Mary's Hospital Medical School in 1960, where he was Reader in the Department of Immunology. From 1965 until his retirement in 1986, he was Professor of Chemical Pathology at Guy’s Hospital Medical School.

The Royal Society's biography of Professor Cohen notes that:

Perhaps of greatest significance was his work with malaria. Sydney (with Ian McGregor) showed for the first time, that immunity could be passively transferred with immune IgG. An in vitro assay was devised for analysing the mechanism of malaria immunity and the variant specificity of protective antibody was demonstrated. This provided a means of isolating malarial antigens and free merozoites and for analysing the basis of host specificity. A practical method has resulted for screening antimalarial drugs.

=== Other positions held ===
He was a member of the Medical Research Council (MRC) and chairman of its Tropical Medicine Research Board, 1974–76. He helped to form the Royal College of Pathologists in 1964. He was elected a fellow of the Royal Society and appointed a CBE in 1978.

=== Family ===
In 1950 he married June Bernice Adler, a magistrate whom he met at a tennis party at her grandfather’s house in Johannesburg. June died in London in 1999, aged 69. That year he married Deirdre Maureen Ann Boyd, who had assisted him at Guy’s, and later they moved to St Andrews, on Scotland’s east coast, where he was a member of the Royal and Ancient golf club; they lived four minutes' walk away.

He died in July 2017 at the age of 95.

His son, Roger Cohen, born in London in 1955, is a columnist for The New York Times and International Herald Tribune.
