= Hillary Mann Leverett =

American diplomat and author

Hillary Mann Leverett is an American diplomat, foreign policy analyst, author, and academic known primarily for her work on U.S.-Iran relations and Middle Eastern diplomacy. She is the CEO of the political risk consultancy firm STRATEGA. Leverett has served in several senior foreign policy positions during the administrations of Presidents George H.W, Bush, Bill Clinton and George W. Bush, later emerging as a prominent critic of American foreign policy toward Iran.

== Professional life ==
Leverett studied at Brandeis University and graduated from Harvard Law School. She also studied at The American University in Cairo and Tel Aviv University, and has received both a Fulbright Scholarship and a Watson Fellowship.

In 1990-1991 she worked in U.S. diplomatic missions across the Middle East, including Saudi Arabia, Egypt, Israel, Kuwait, Qatar, and the United Arab Emirates. She also worked on the State Department’s policy planning staff and at the U.S. Mission to the United Nations and as Political Advisor for Middle East, Central Asian and African issues for the U.S. Mission to the United Nations.

In the George W. Bush Administration, Leverett served on the National Security Council as director for Iran, Afghanistan, and Persian Gulf affairs, Following the September 11 attacks, from 2001 to 2003 she was among the small group of US officials authorized to engage directly with Iranian diplomats regarding Afghanistan, al-Qaeda, and regional security issues.

After leaving government service, Leverett moved into consulting and public commentary. She became chief executive officer (CEO) of STRATEGA, a political risk consultancy.

== Author of Going to Tehran ==
Leverett is best known as co-author of the 2013 book Going to Tehran: Why the United States Must Come to Terms with the Islamic Republic of Iran, with her husband, former CIA analyst Flynt Leverett. The book argues for a strategic U.S. rapprochement with Iran.
