= Flynt Leverett =

American government official

Flynt L. Leverett (born March 6, 1958, in Memphis, Tennessee) is a former senior fellow at the New America Foundation in Washington, D.C., and a professor at the Pennsylvania State University School of International Affairs. From March 2002 to March 2003, he served as the senior director for Middle East affairs on the National Security Council (NSC).

Prior to serving on the NSC, he was a counterterrorism expert on the Policy Planning Staff of the U.S. State Department, and before that he served as a CIA senior analyst for eight years. Since leaving government service, Leverett served as a visiting fellow at the Brookings Institution's Saban Center for Middle East Policy before becoming the director of the Geopolitics of Energy Initiative in the American Strategy Program at the New America Foundation.

== Professional life ==
Professor Leverett graduated with the degrees of B.A., B.M., from Texas Christian University and went on to earn M.A. and Ph.D. degrees from Princeton University. His areas of professional expertise include U.S. Middle East and Persian Gulf policy, international energy affairs, and international security. He is a founding faculty member of the School of International Affairs of Pennsylvania State University. He has testified before Congress, and has appeared on numerous major television news-oriented broadcasts.

On December 16, 2006, Leverett was denied permission to publish a 1,000 word opinion piece, co-written with his wife, Hillary Mann and based on his previously approved 35 page paper "Dealing with Tehran: Assessing U.S. Diplomatic Options Toward Iran." The longer paper and its shorter piece are critical of the George W. Bush administration's refusal to engage in "comprehensive" negotiations with the government of Iran.

Leverett had intended to publish the shorter article in The New York Times. In a statement to the online publication Talking Points Memo, he disputed the official justification for the decision.

The White House is demanding, before it will consider clearing the op-ed for publication, that I excise entire paragraphs dealing with matters that I have written about (and received clearance from the CIA to do so) in several other pieces, that have been publicly acknowledged by Secretary Rice, former Secretary of State Colin Powell, and former Deputy Secretary of State Richard Armitage, and that have been extensively covered in the media.

In the same statement, Leverett places the blame for quashing the op-ed piece on

White House staffers... working for Elliott Abrams and Meghan O'Sullivan, both politically appointed deputies to President Bush's National Security Advisor Stephen Hadley.

In a 2010 New York Times op-ed co-authored with his wife Hillary Mann Leverett, Flynt described the Iranian opposition movement as weak and not representing "anything close to a majority." He criticised President Obama's Iran policy as "half-hearted efforts." The Leveretts' op-ed was criticized by Abbas Milani. Calling the Leveretts' op-ed "the most infuriating op-ed of the new year", Milani said that Obama's efforts to reach out to the Ayatollah had been rejected and ridiculed by the Iranian government. In a 2010 article in the Atlantic, Jeffrey Goldberg described the Leveretts as "cynical foreign policy realists", and criticized their reasons for a policy of conciliation between the US and a "regime that rapes and murders its own citizens" as "semi-inexplicable."

Together with his wife Hillary Mann Leverett, he is author of the 2013 nonfiction book Going to Tehran.

== Bibliography ==
=== Books and reports ===
- Leverett, Flynt (2004). US-Iran Relations: Looking Back and Looking Ahead. Abu Dhabi: Emirates Center for Strategic Studies and Research.
- — (2005). Inheriting Syria: Bashar's Trial by Fire. Washington, DC: Brookings Institution Press. ISBN 9780815752042.
- —, ed. (2005). The Road Ahead: Middle East Policy in the Bush Administration's Second Term: Planning Papers. Washington, DC: Brookings Institution Press.
- — (2006). Dealing with Tehran: Assessing U.S. Diplomatic Options toward Iran (PDF). New York: The Century Foundation.
- Leverett, Flynt; Leverett, Hillary Mann (2013). Going to Tehran: Why the United States Must Come to Terms with the Islamic Republic of Iran. New York: Metropolitan Books/Henry Holt.

=== Essays ===
- Leverett, Flynt; Leverett, Hillary Mann (November 2012). "The mad mullah myth: The dangers of misunderstanding Iran's strategy". Revision. Harper's Magazine. Vol. 325, no. 1950. pp. 53–55.

== Video ==
- Leverett, Flynt (2006-12-18). New America Foundation Discussion on Iran Issues (TV-Public Affairs). Washington, D.C.: C-SPAN.
