= Roger Cohen =

British-American journalist and writer (born 1955)

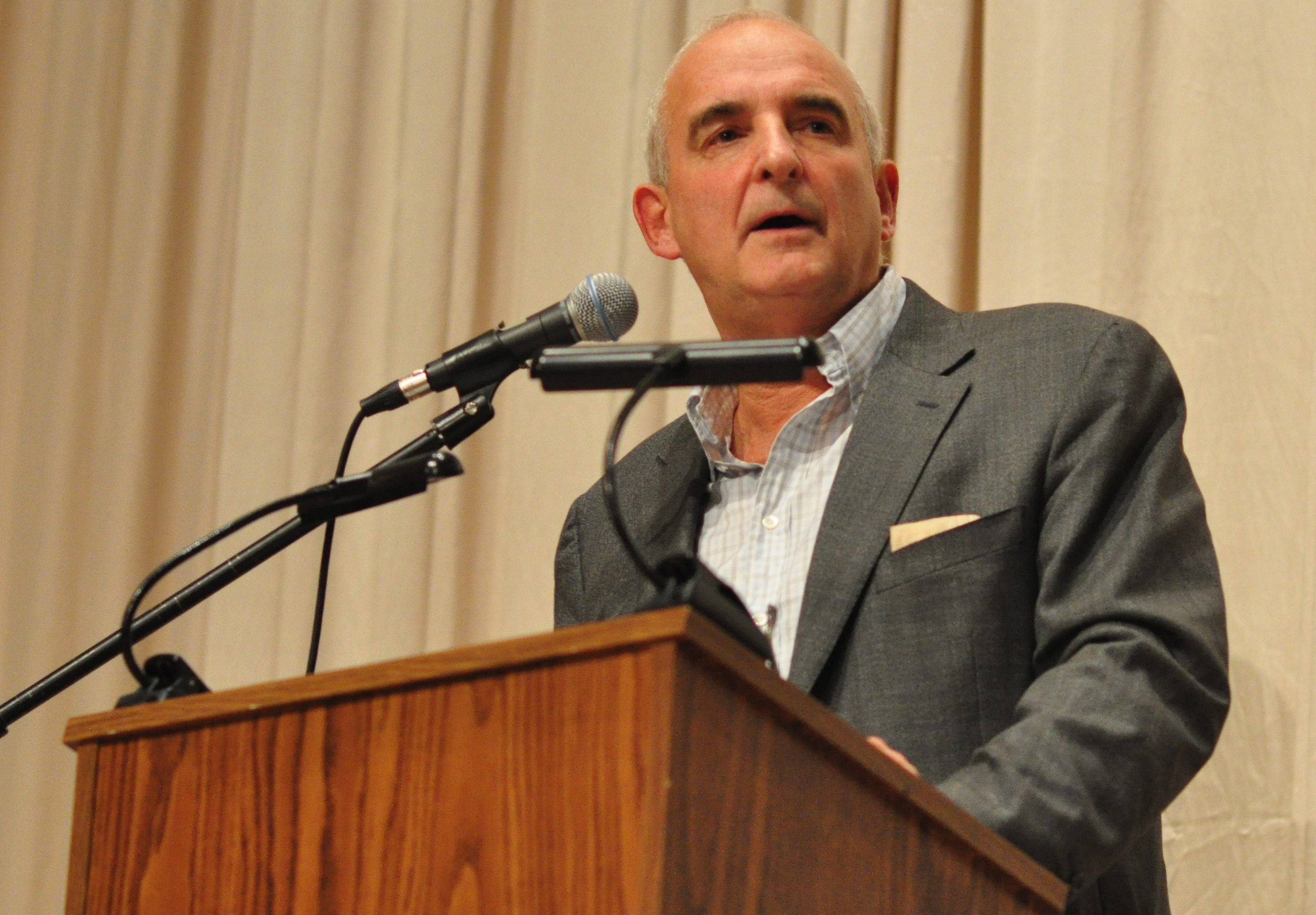
- Roger Cohen (2015)
- Born: 2 August 1955 (age 71); London, England
- Citizenship: American
- Education: University of Oxford, Balliol College, Westminster School
- Occupations: Journalist, columnist, author
- Notable credit: The New York Times
- Partner: Sarah H. Cleveland
- Children: 4
- Parent(s): Sydney Cohen and June Cohen (née Adler)

Roger Cohen is a Pulitzer-Prize winning journalist and author. He is a correspondent and former foreign editor and Op-Ed columnist for The New York Times. He has worked as a foreign correspondent in more than 60 countries and was named Paris bureau chief in October 2020.

== Early life and education ==
Cohen was born in London to a Jewish family. His father, Sydney Cohen, a doctor, emigrated from South Africa to England in the 1950s. In the late 1960s, Roger studied at Westminster School, one of Britain's top private schools. He won a scholarship and would have entered College, the scholars' House, but was told that a Jew could not attend College or hold his particular scholarship. (The scholarship initially offered to him was intended for persons who professed the Christian faith, as he later learned while researching the affair.) Instead, he was awarded an Honorary Scholarship.

In 1973, Cohen travelled with friends throughout the Middle East, including Iran and Afghanistan. He drove a Volkswagen Kombi named 'Pigpen' after the late keyboard-playing frontman of the Grateful Dead. He studied History and French at Balliol College, Oxford, and graduated in 1977. He left that year for Paris to teach English and to write for Paris Metro. He started working for Reuters and the agency transferred him to Brussels. Cohen's mother, June, also from South Africa (born 1929), attempted suicide in London in 1978. She died there in 1999 and was buried in Johannesburg.

== Career ==
Living through a war in Europe was a harrowing experience in many ways, but I think that for everyone there of my pampered generation, it was also an education. In war, you see people pushed to their limits. To try to evoke that, to convey those experiences and so to impact government policy when governments are doing their best to ignore terrible things—that can be rewarding in more lasting ways than most journalism.

In 1983, Cohen joined The Wall Street Journal in Rome to cover the Italian economy. The Journal sent him to Beirut on assignment, his first experience of covering wars. He joined The New York Times in January 1990. In the summer of 1991, he co-authored with Claudio Gatti In the Eye of the Storm: The Life of General H. Norman Schwarzkopf. The authors wrote the book based on information from Norman Schwarzkopf's sister Sally, without Schwarzkopf's help.

Cohen worked for The New York Times as its European economic correspondent, based in Paris, from January 1992 to April 1994. He then became the paper's Balkan bureau chief, based in Zagreb, from April 1994 to June 1995. He covered the Bosnian War, mainly from Sarajevo, and the related Bosnian Genocide. His exposé of a Serb-run Bosnian concentration camp won the Burger Human Rights Award from the Overseas Press Club of America.

Cohen wrote a retrospective book about his Balkan experiences called Hearts Grown Brutal: Sagas of Sarajevo in 1998. It won a Citation for Excellence from the Overseas Press Club in 1999. Cohen wrote in Hearts Grown Brutal that his coverage of the war changed him as a person, and that he considers himself lucky to still be alive. He later called this period a pivotal moment of his journalistic career, as it was for many reporters of his generation covering a war in Europe.

Cohen returned to the paper's Paris bureau from June 1995 to August 1998. He served as chief of the Berlin bureau after September 1998. He took over as foreign editor of the paper, based in New York, on the day of the September 11 attacks. His acting role was made formal on 14 March 2022. During his tenure he planned and oversaw the paper's coverage of the War in Afghanistan and of the international impact of 9/11, in a year when The New York Times won seven Pulitzer Prizes.

In 2004, Cohen began writing a column called 'Globalist', which was published twice a week in The International Herald Tribune. In 2005, Cohen's third book, Soldiers and Slaves: American POWs Trapped by the Nazis' Final Gamble, was published by Alfred A. Knopf. In 2006, he became the first senior editor for The International Herald Tribune. After columnist Nicholas D. Kristof took a temporary leave in mid-2006, Cohen took over Kristof's position temporarily. He was named a Times columnist in 2009 and wrote an opinion column for more than a decade. In 2020, he moved to Paris as Bureau Chief.

=== Iraq ===
Cohen supported the 2003 American-led invasion of Iraq. He criticised the Bush administration's handling of the occupation while still supporting the cause given the brutality of Saddam Hussein's regime. In January 2009, he commented that Saddam's "death-and-genocide machine killed about 400,000 Iraqis and another million or so people in Iran and Kuwait." He wrote that "I still believe Iraq's freedom outweighs its terrible price."

=== Iran ===
Cohen wrote a series of articles for The New York Times in February 2009 about a trip to Iran. In his writings he expressed opposition to military action against Iran and encouraged negotiations between the United States and the Islamic Republic. He remarked that Iranian Jews were relatively well treated—there is still a community there unlike in Iraq, Syria and many other Middle Eastern states—and said the Jewish community was "living, working and worshiping in relative tranquility." He also described the hospitality that he received in Iran, stating that "I'm a Jew and have seldom been treated with such consistent warmth as in Iran." Like all foreign correspondents working in Iran he was obliged to work with a translator and fixer approved by the Iranian regime. The fixer was honest enough to tell him he, like everyone in that role, had to file a brief report each evening on their activities.

Cohen was later criticised by Flynt Leverett and Hillary Mann Leverett in the New York Review of Books for trumpeting what they said were baseless accusations of electoral fraud in the 2009 Presidential election. Mahmoud Ahmadinejad, the incumbent, was declared victorious amid a wave of repressive violence. Cohen, who was one of the last international journalists on the ground covering the violence, replied that the pair were guilty of, amongst other things, "a cavalier disregard for the Islamic Republic's intermittent brutality", and were "apologists without a conscience".

=== Israel ===
Cohen has written:

I am a Zionist because the story of my forebears convinces me that Jews needed the homeland voted into existence by United Nations Resolution 181 of 1947, calling for the establishment of two states — one Jewish, one Arab — in Mandate Palestine. I am a Zionist who believes in the words of Israel’s founding charter of 1948 declaring that the nascent state would be based “on freedom, justice and peace as envisaged by the prophets of Israel.” What I cannot accept, however, is the perversion of Zionism that has seen the inexorable growth of a Messianic Israeli nationalism claiming all the land between the Mediterranean and the Jordan River; that has, for almost a half-century now, produced the systematic oppression of another people in the West Bank.

Cohen has opposed the Boycott, Divestment and Sanctions movement, saying its "hidden agenda" is the "end of Israel as a Jewish state" and he has written:

I am a strong supporter of a two-state peace. The messianic idea of Greater Israel, occupying all the land between the Mediterranean and the Jordan River, must wither. Jews, having suffered for most of their history as a minority, cannot, as a majority now in their state, keep their boots on the heads of the Palestinians in the occupied West Bank any longer. Palestinians must accept the permanence of the state of Israel within the 1967 lines with equitable land swaps. Competitive victimhood should cede to collaborative viability for the nation states of the Jewish and Palestinian peoples. Narratives and revealed truth do not a future make. They perpetuate the imprisoning past.

Cohen wrote in January 2009 that the Israel-Palestinian conflict should not be seen by the United States as just another part of the war on terrorism. He called for the ending of Israeli settlement construction in the West Bank and the ending of the blockade of the Gaza Strip. He also supported the reconciling of Hamas with Fatah after their violent split. In addition, he criticised the Obama administration for its continuance of past United States policies towards Israel.

Cohen opposed Operation Cast Lead, labelling it "wretchedly named – and disastrous". He has accused Israelis of the "slaying of hundreds of Palestinian children" in the campaign. In an 8 March column, Cohen stated that he had "never previously felt so shamed by Israel's actions." However, in one of his articles in The New York Times, Cohen analyses the differences between European and American attitudes toward Israel. He contrasts a growing antisemitism in Europe with Americans' generalized support for Israel, and attempts to explain why Americans are more supportive of Israel than Europeans are. In closing the article, Cohen said, "I am pleased to have become a naturalized American."

== Awards ==
Cohen has won numerous awards and honours, among them a 2023 Pulitzer Prize and a George Polk award as a member of Times teams covering the war in Ukraine. He won a second George Polk award in 2024 for work on the Israel-Gaza conflict, and an Overseas Press Club award for an essay on Russia. In 2021, Mr. Cohen received the Légion d’Honneur from the French Republic – France’s highest order of merit – for his work over four decades. In 2017, he was awarded the Society of Publishers in Asia (SOPA) prize for Opinion writing for a series on Australian mistreatment of refugees. He won the same award in 2018 for a piece about the Rohingya crisis in Burma. He has taught at Princeton and Indiana University Bloomington, was a Fisher Family Fellow at Harvard's Belfer Center, and was awarded the Joe Alex Morris lectureship for distinguished foreign correspondence by the Nieman Foundation for Journalism at Harvard University. He received an Overseas Press Club award for his coverage of third world debt in 1987, the Inter-American Press Association "Tom Wallace" Award for feature writing in 1989 and in 2012, Cohen won the Lifetime Achievement award at the 8th annual International Media Awards in London. He received in 2025 a Carnegie Corporation of New York Great Immigrant Award

== Personal life ==
Cohen was first married to Katherine Lund and had two children. He subsequently married the sculptor Frida Baranek, and had two more children. They ultimately divorced. His life partner is Sarah H. Cleveland, a judge on the International Court of Justice.

== Books ==
Cohen has written five books, including a family memoir entitled The Girl from Human Street: A Jewish Family Odyssey (2015) and a collection of essays and columns entitled An Affirming Flame: Meditations on Life and Politics (2023). He is the author of Soldiers and Slaves: American POWs Trapped by the Nazis’ Final Gamble (2005) and Hearts Grown Brutal: Sagas of Sarajevo (1998), an account of the wars of Yugoslavia's destruction. He co-wrote a biography of General Norman Schwarzkopf, In the Eye of the Storm (Farrar Straus & Giroux, 1991).

== Published works ==
- (With Claudio Gatti) In the Eye of the Storm: The Life of General H. Norman Schwarzkopf. New York: Farrar, Straus, Giroux, 1991. ISBN 978-0-374-17708-9
- Hearts Grown Brutal: Sagas of Sarajevo. New York: Random House, 1998. ISBN 0-679-45243-5 ISBN 978-0679452430
- Soldiers and Slaves: American POWs Trapped by the Nazis' Final Gamble. New York: Knopf, 2005. ISBN 0-375-41410-X ISBN 978-0375414107
- Danger in the Desert: True Adventures of a Dinosaur Hunter, New York: Sterling, 2008. ISBN 978-1402757068
- The Girl from Human Street: Ghosts of Memory in a Jewish Family, New York: Knopf, 2015. ISBN 978-0307594662
- An Affirming Flame: Meditations on Life and Politics, New York: Alfred A. Knopf, 2023. ISBN 978-0593321522
