= Barnato Park High School =

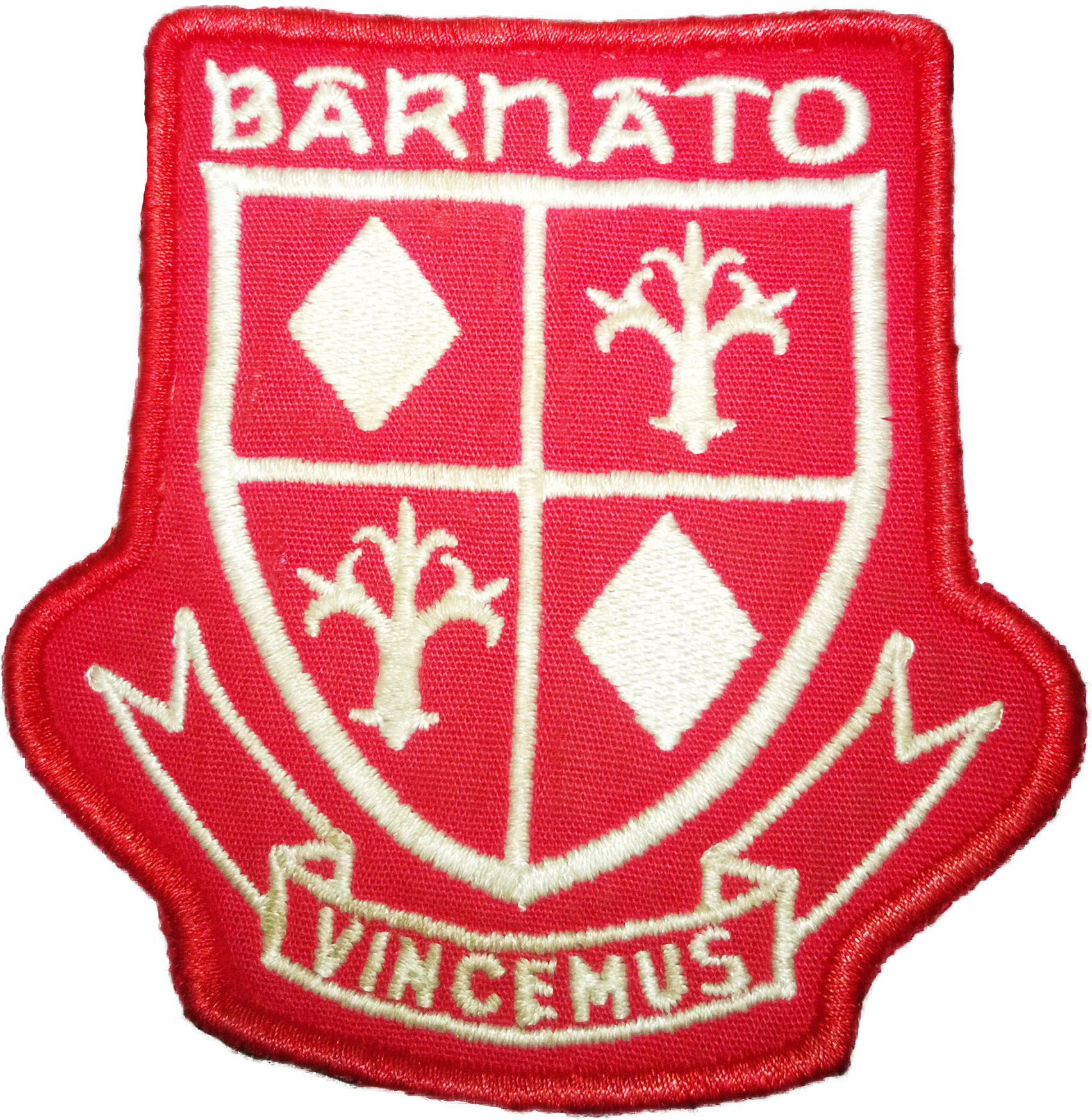
- BPHS Badge

Location
- Berea, Johannesburg, South Africa; Johannesburg, Gauteng 2198; South Africa
- Coordinates: 26°11′06″S 28°3′05″E

Information
- Type: Public school
- Established: 1990
- Founder: Fanny Buckland
- School district: D9-JE
- Principal: Mervin Frank
- Teaching staff: 32
- Grades: 8–12
- Enrolment: 950
- Average class size: 45
- Colors: Grey, White and Red
- Slogan: Vincemus!, Vincemus! we win yet again
- Song: BPHS School Song
- School fees: R5100 P/a
- Alumni: Johannesburg Girls High School

Barnato Park High School is a co-educational school located in Berea, Johannesburg, South Africa. It was built on the site of the mansion that had been designed for Barney Barnato, the mining millionaire.

== History ==
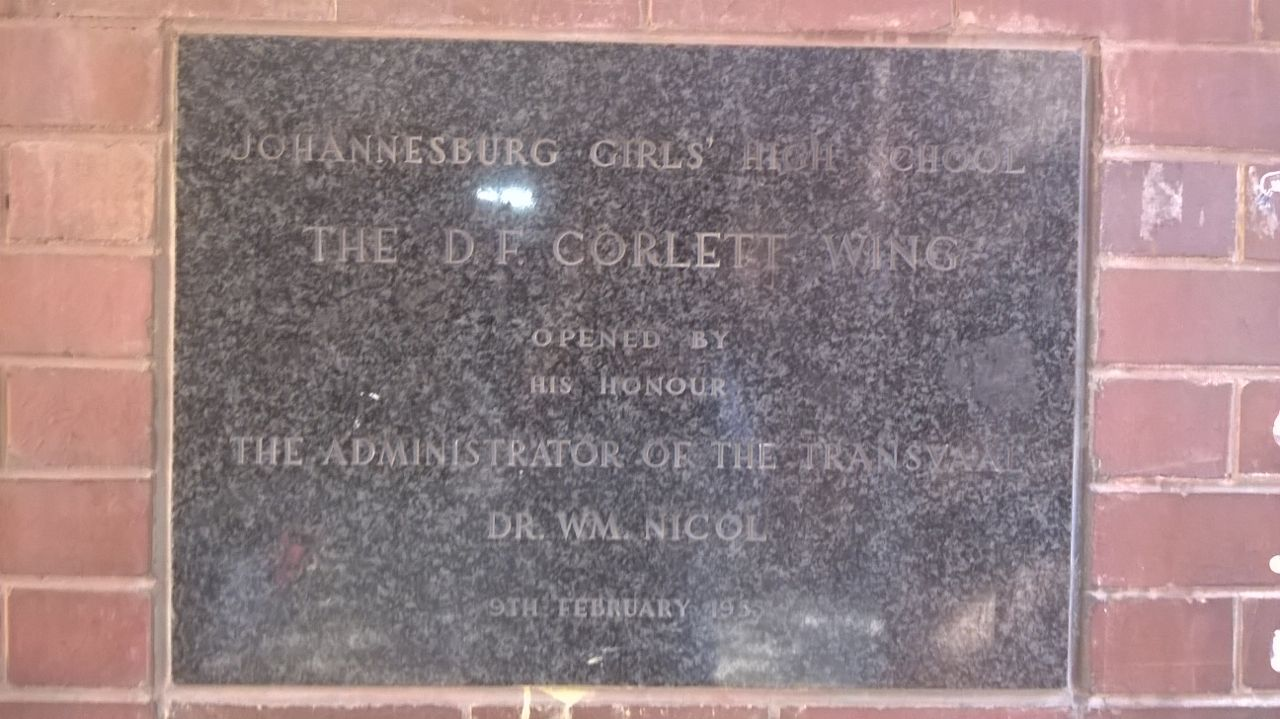
The D.F. Corlett Wing, Opened by his honour, The Administrator Of The Transvaal, Dr. WM. Nicol, 9 February 1955

The large 1897 stone mansion, originally built for the Randlord Barnato, would not be used as he died before the completion of the mansion due to mysterious circumstances. The stone mansion had been located in Berea, Johannesburg and was finished under the supervision of Solly Joel, Barney Barnato's nephew and was known as the Joel house. The premises had been used for a time during the Second Boer War from (1899–1902) as a British Officers' convalescent home and later as temporary premises for the sister school King Edward VII school while its present-day buildings were being erected in Houghton. At a later period the property had been donated to the Transvaal Department of Education to be used as an educational institution which had been founded by Miss Fanny Buckland in Jeppe Street just fourteen months after Johannesburg's birth.They moved with 30 children to a church building in Kerk Street and in 1895 became Cleveland School (after a benefactress), and eventually. Johannesburg Girls' School in Barnato Park in 1912.The grounds and Joel House were given to the Government of the Union of South Africa for a girls' school by Mr Solly Joel, nephew and heir of Barney Barnato. Fanny Buckland was principal and taught for 35 years. She retired in 1922. With the growth of the school, it had to be re-located about three times before ending up in 1910 on its present site in Berea. The Johannesburg girls preparatory school which was known as the younger sister school was separated from the high school in 1905 and moved opposite the school in 1921.

=== Joel house ===
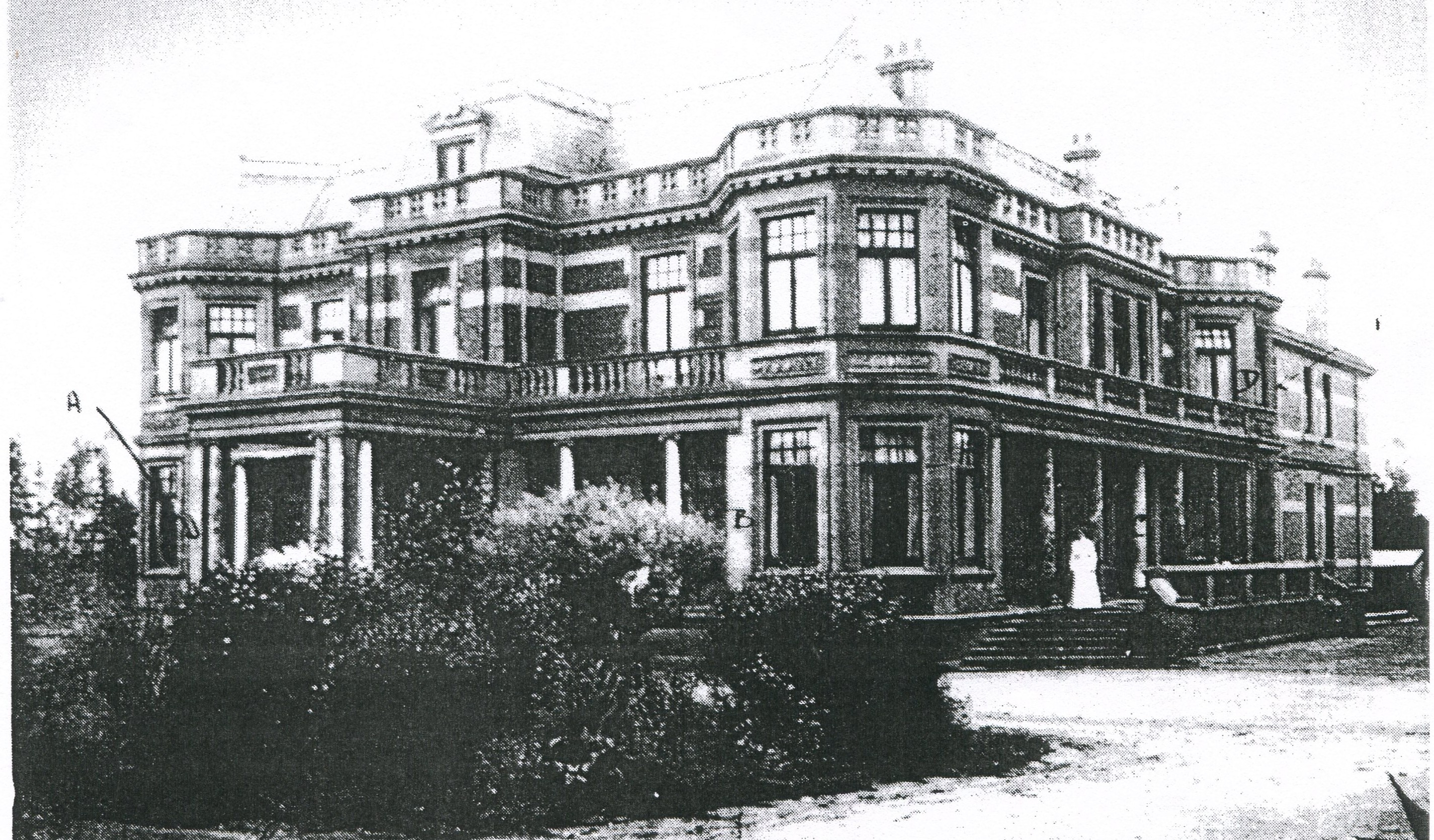

After the first hectic scramble for Johannesburg's gold-bearing land, the Randlords sought less spectacular profits through turning their surplus landholdings to real estate. The Johannesburg Consolidated investment Company headed by the colourful Barney Barnato, laid out the township of Berea in the 1890s as a better-class suburb that they hope would rival Rand Mines' Parktown. Among its attractions was a public recreation ground, Barnato Park. In the middle of it Barnato had in 1897 decreed himself a very stately home indeed. The large stone mansion, built in classical English country house style, served from 1912 till its demolition in 1962 as the borders' residence of the Johannesburg High School for Girls.

The original five-hectare park was elaborately laid out with lawns, statuary, shrubberies, a 'Ladies Mile' for riding a lake big enough for boating. Barney Barnato neither saw his home completed nor lived in it; in 1897 he threw himself into the Atlantic from a London-bound liner and drowned. After his death it took the name of his nephew and heir Solly Joel, who later presented the mansion and park to the Government to commemorate the 1910 Union of South Africa.

Before the school moved in during 1912, Joel House had been used for a time during the Second Boer War as a British Officers' convalescent home and later as temporary premises for King Edward VII boys' school while its present-day buildings were being erected in Houghton.

The centre of the school was Joel House Mansion, Which pupils had lived in, but in 1960 the Joel House was condemned as a health hazard and demolished shortly afterwards. "The school which was installed there remains familiarly known to this day as 'Barnato Park'. It is the oldest girls' school in the city, founded by Miss Fanny Buckland in Jeppe Street just fourteen months after Johannesburg's birth."

=== The Gates ===
"There remain three magnificent pairs of wrought-iron gates (a fourth was quietly spirited away during the rebuilding operations), facing onto Barnato Street, Park Lane and Beatrice Lane. These along with a gatekeeper's cottage at the Barnato Street entrance are the only relics of Barney Barnato's country mansion. 'Sadly, Joel House, Barnato's mansion, was demolished, and all that remains of the original Barnato Park are the beautiful wrought iron gates which were made in Bristol, England,' said Popplewell." The gates at Barnato Park High School are all that is left of Randlord Barney Barnato's mansion.'" The gates were manufactured by Gardiner Sons & Co.Ltd. Bristol.

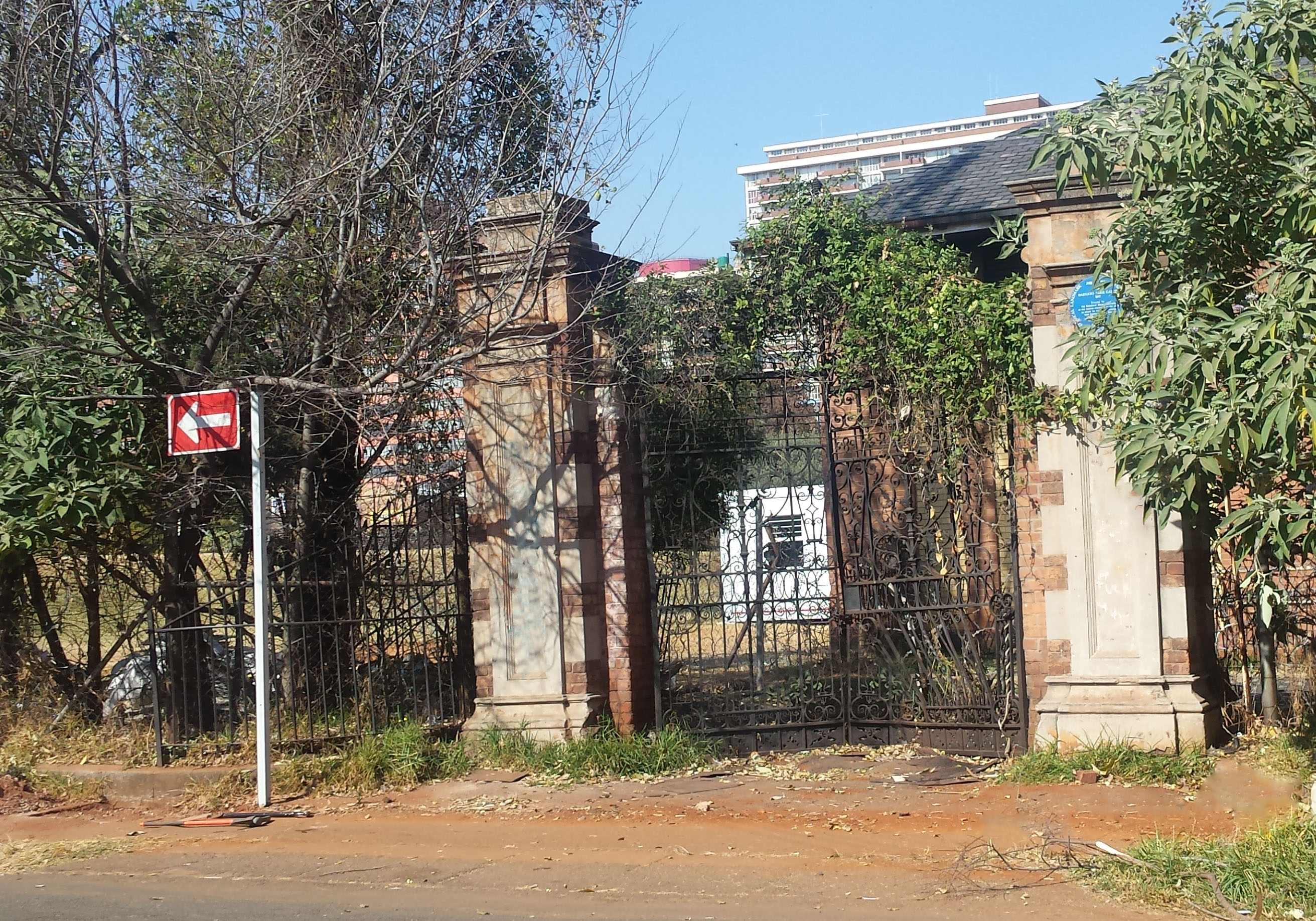
Gate found on Park Lane (Manufactured by Gardiner Sons & Co.Ltd. Bristol)

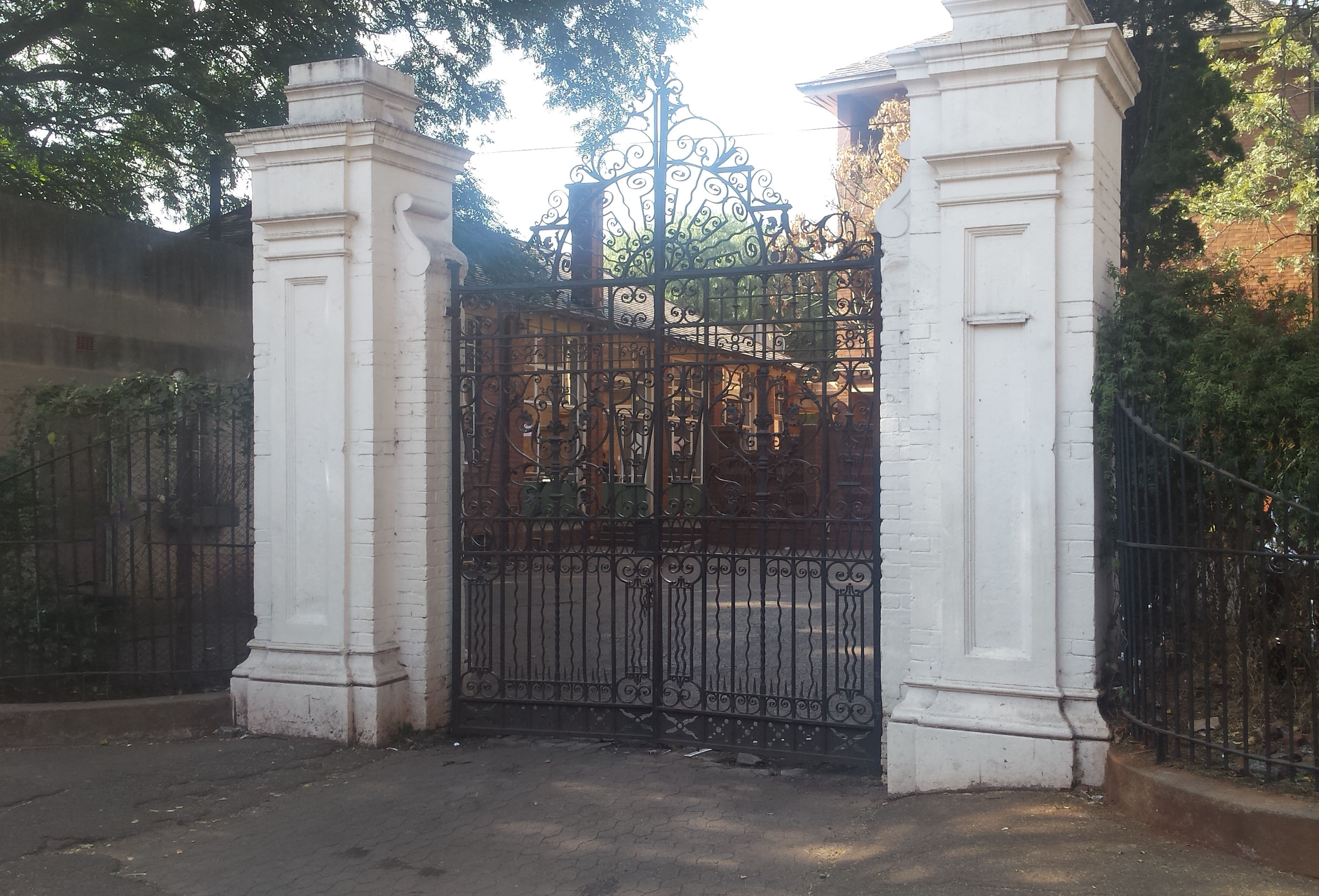
Gate on Beatrice Lane also used as the main entrance

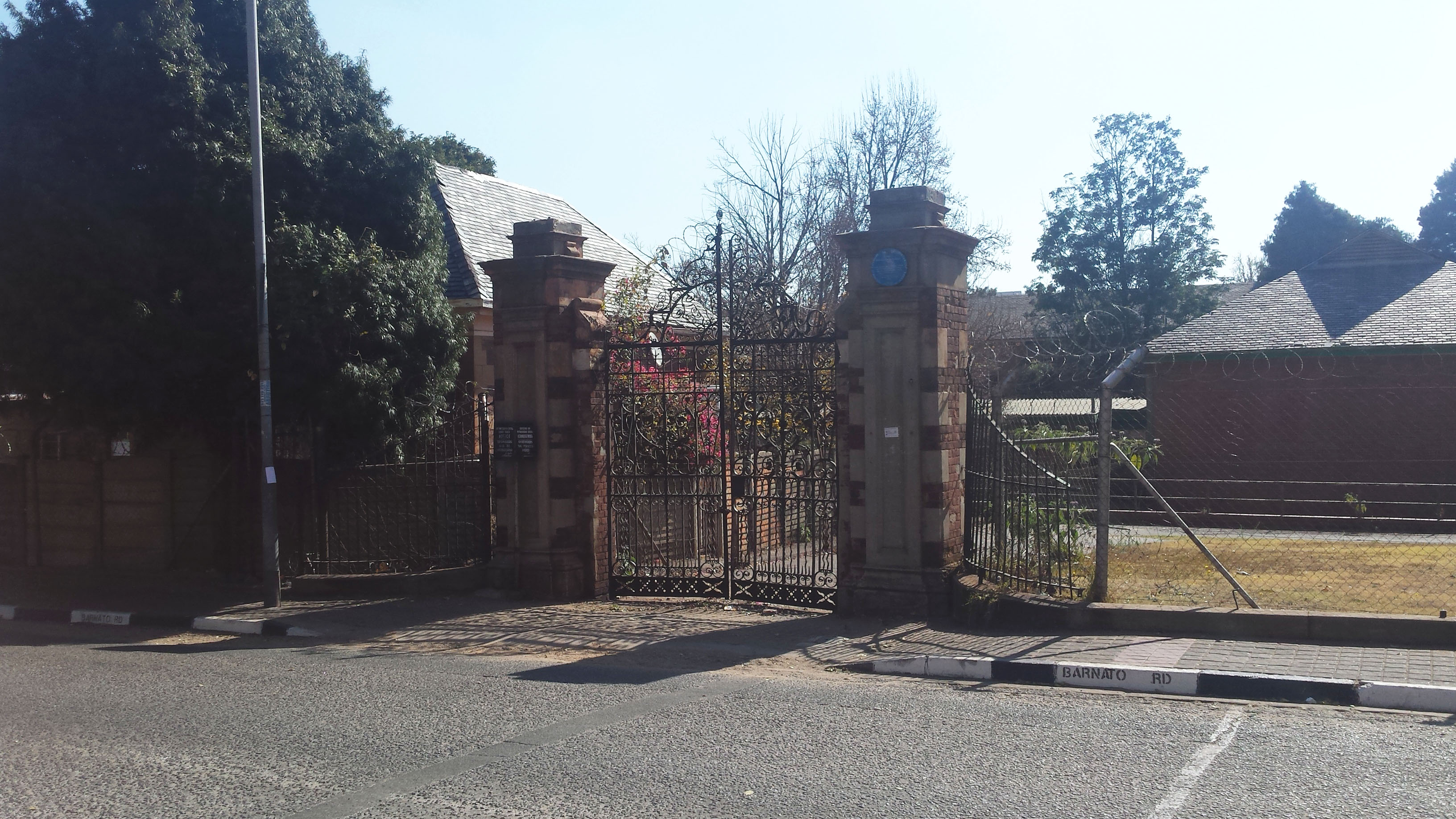
Gate found on Barnato Road (Manufactured by Gardiner Sons & Co.Ltd. Bristol)

=== Barnato Park and Vincemus ===
The name Barnato park can be traced back all the way to the school song which was composed by Mr. John Connell and words by Miss G. Johnson. The word Vincemus means "We shall Conquer". The diamond on the crest represents the Barnato diamond mining company which he owned during his time in South Africa.

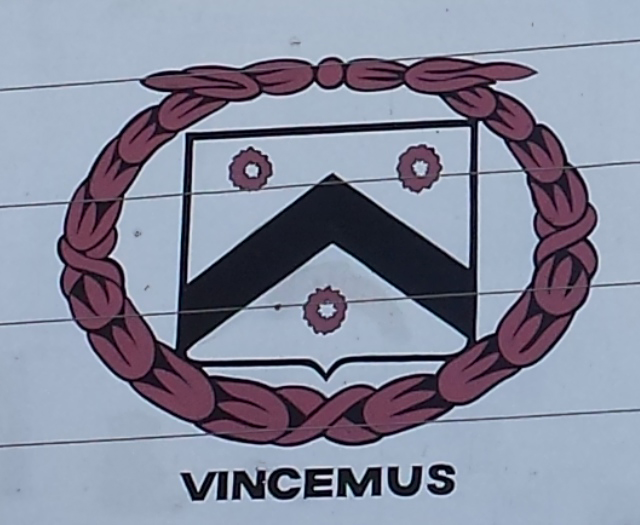
Johannesburg Girls Preparatory School Badge

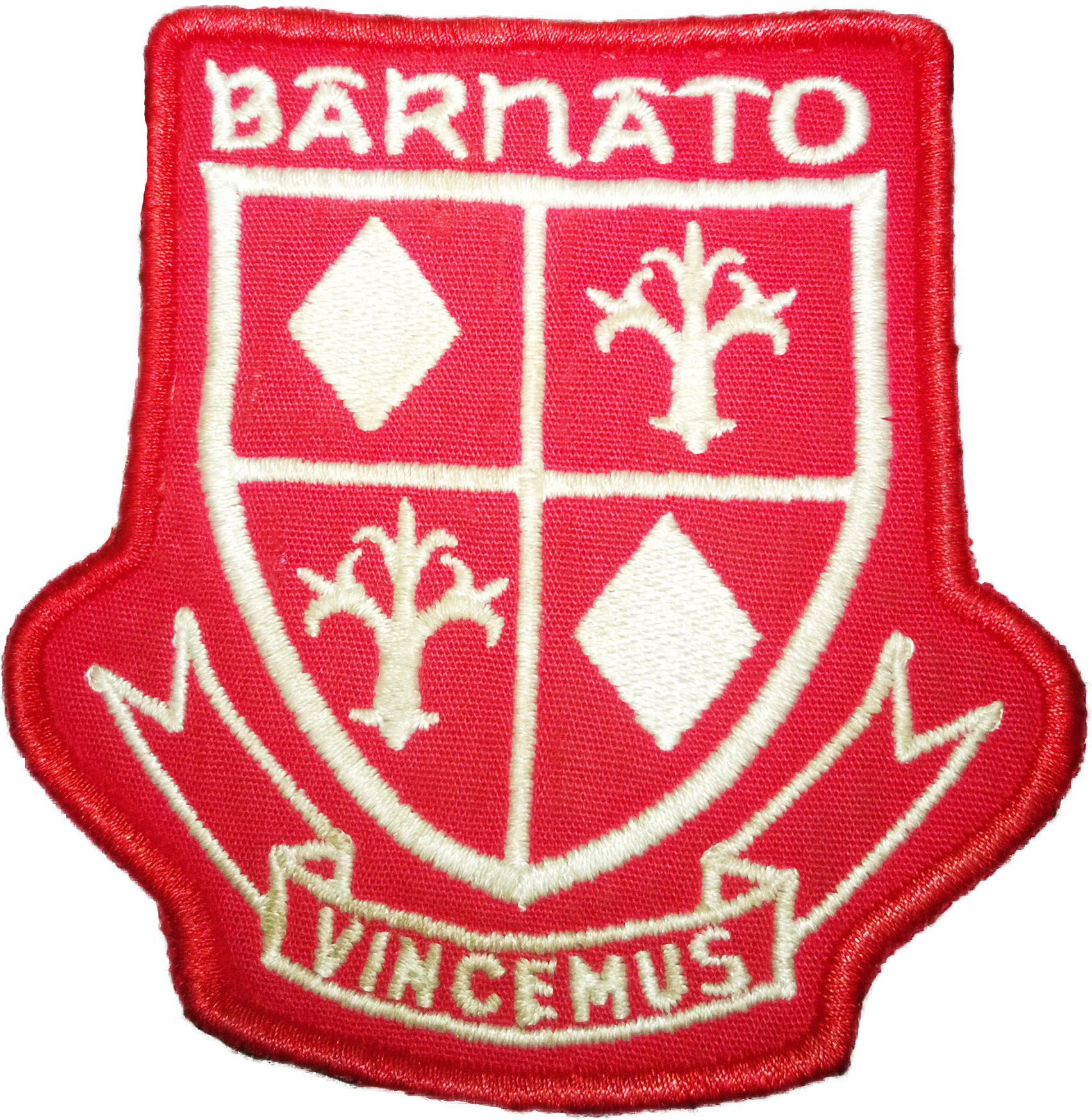
Barnato Park High School Badge

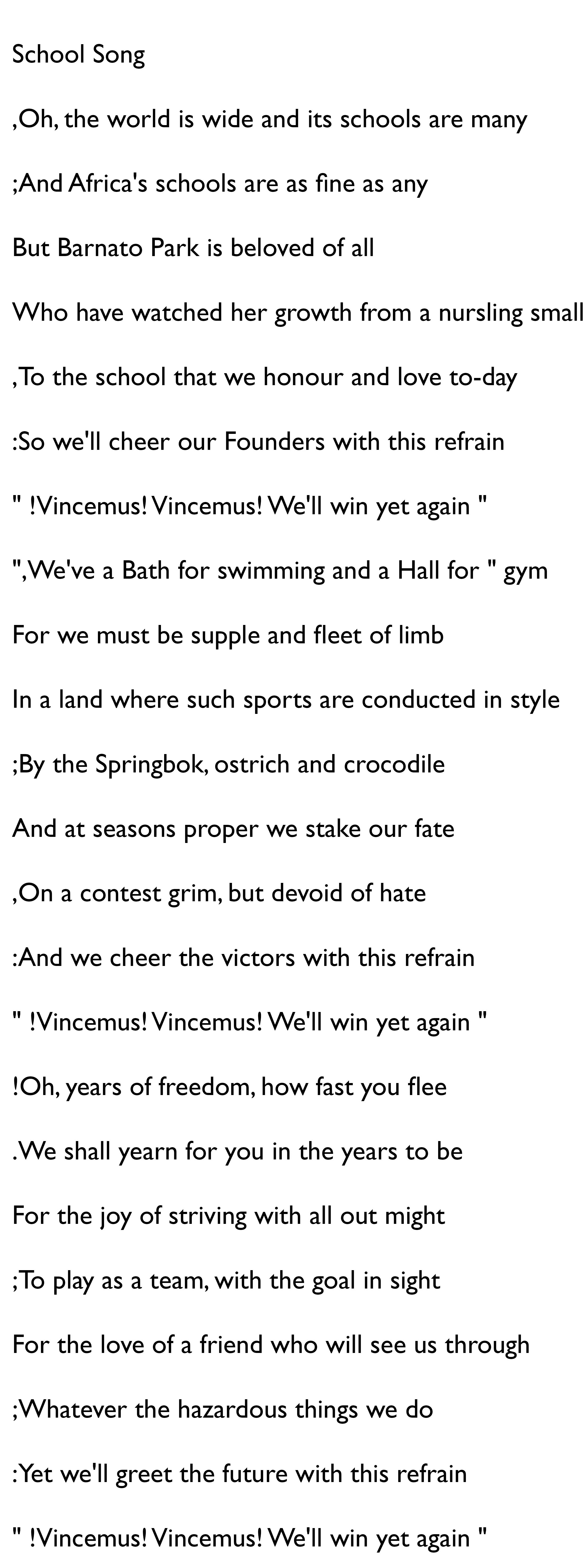
The School Song

=== Centenary ===
2 November 1987, marked the 100th Anniversary of Johannesburg Girls High School : Barnato Park High School. The centenary celebrations at the school, were held on 19 September with a special formal assembly, graced by Dr. K.R Paine (The Deputy Director Of Education) who addressed the young learners, parents, staff and dignitaries. The Johannesburg High School for Girls matric class of 1963 is gearing up to celebrate its 50th reunion next month.

This year also marks the 100th anniversary of the school on the historic site of Randlord Barney Barnato's estate.

Former pupil Helen Popplewell said the school was only one year younger than the city.

"As the city has changed, so has the school. In 1887, Fanny Buckland opened her school in the mining village of Johannesburg, and in 1913, the school moved to its present site, Barnato Park, Berea", she said.

After Barnato's death, his nephew Solly Joel presented the estate to the new Union government for use as a school.

Today, the school is known as Barnato Park High School, a dynamic, co-educational institution that attracts pupils from Hillbrow, Beara, Yeoville and other suburbs and the inner cit as well as students from Alexandra and Soweto.

"This year marks both Barnato Park High School's 100th anniversary on the site, and it marks the 50th year celebration for the approximately 100 matric pupils of the class of 1963," she said.

Popplewell invited her former classmates to celebrate their 50th reunion on 25 October at the school.

"We're looking forward to a wonderful trip down memory lane. Vincemus, vincemus, we will win yet again," said Popplewell.

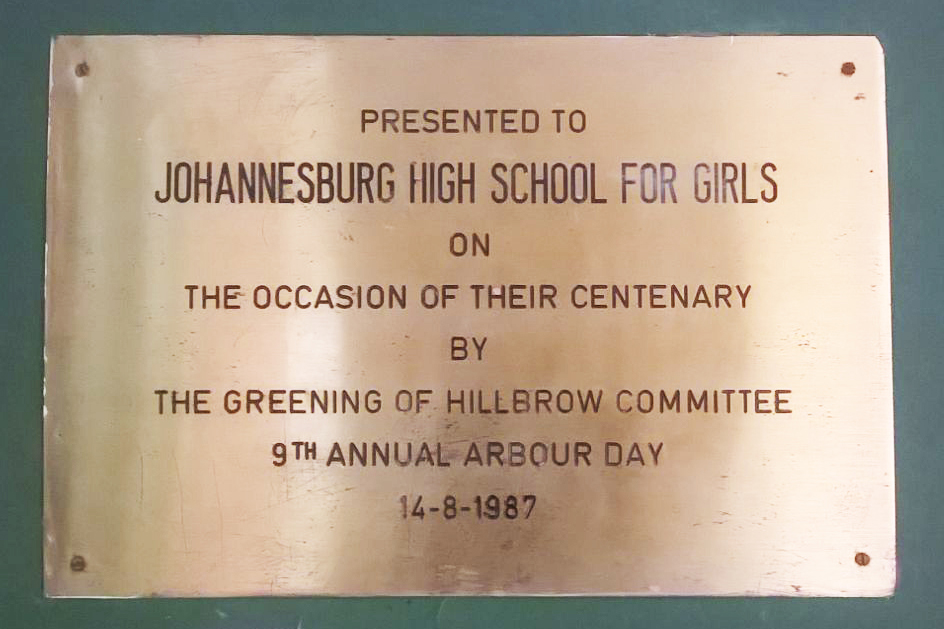
The Occasion of their Centenary By The Greenin Of Hillbrow Committee 14-8-1987

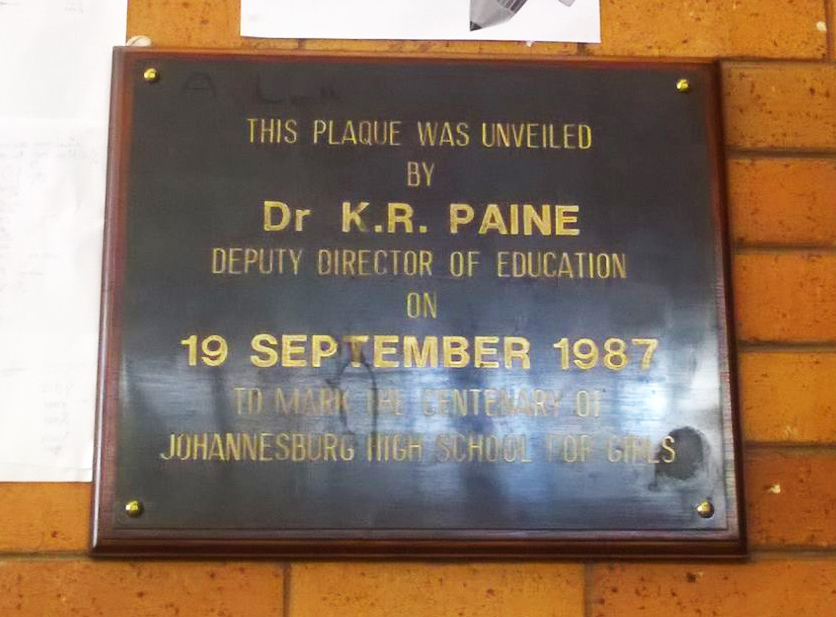
The plaque unveiled By Dr. K.R Paine (Deputy Director of Education) on 19 September 1987. To mark The Centenary

=== Johannesburg High School For Girls – Barnato Park High School ===
In June 1989 Johannesburg High School For Girls, had been condemned to death after 102 years it finally closed on 31 December 1989. Barnato Park High School as a co-educational non-racial secondary school opened in January 1990 as a result of the weakening of the apartheid state under Prime Minister P. W. Botha, who used his policy of Total Strategy to bring about reform and greater repression in the 1980s. The 1990s ushered in the winds of charge in South Africa and the cosmopolitan area of Berea and Hillbrow where it coped well with varied influx of immigrants and the new era school would also now serve fellow South African's if all races, the obvious dwindling enrollment numbers of white female pupils and those moving out of the area to areas like Sandton made it possible for many others who had moved away from the townships which meant that the school was going to lose pupils so they decided to change the school's admission policies and name. Barnato Park High School successfully opened in the year 1990 to all races in an attempt to rid South Africa's education system of the apartheid-driven legislation and also in an attempt to fostering interaction between races which had been kept apart. In 1990 the school started with 250 learners and a staff of 10. Tuition was offered from standard 6 to standard 8. Under the leadership of the principal Mrs. Laura Marcis, the first matriculants in 1992 obtained a pass rate of 88% and in 1993 97%. Also from 1998 to 2000 a 100% pass rate.

== Notable achievements ==
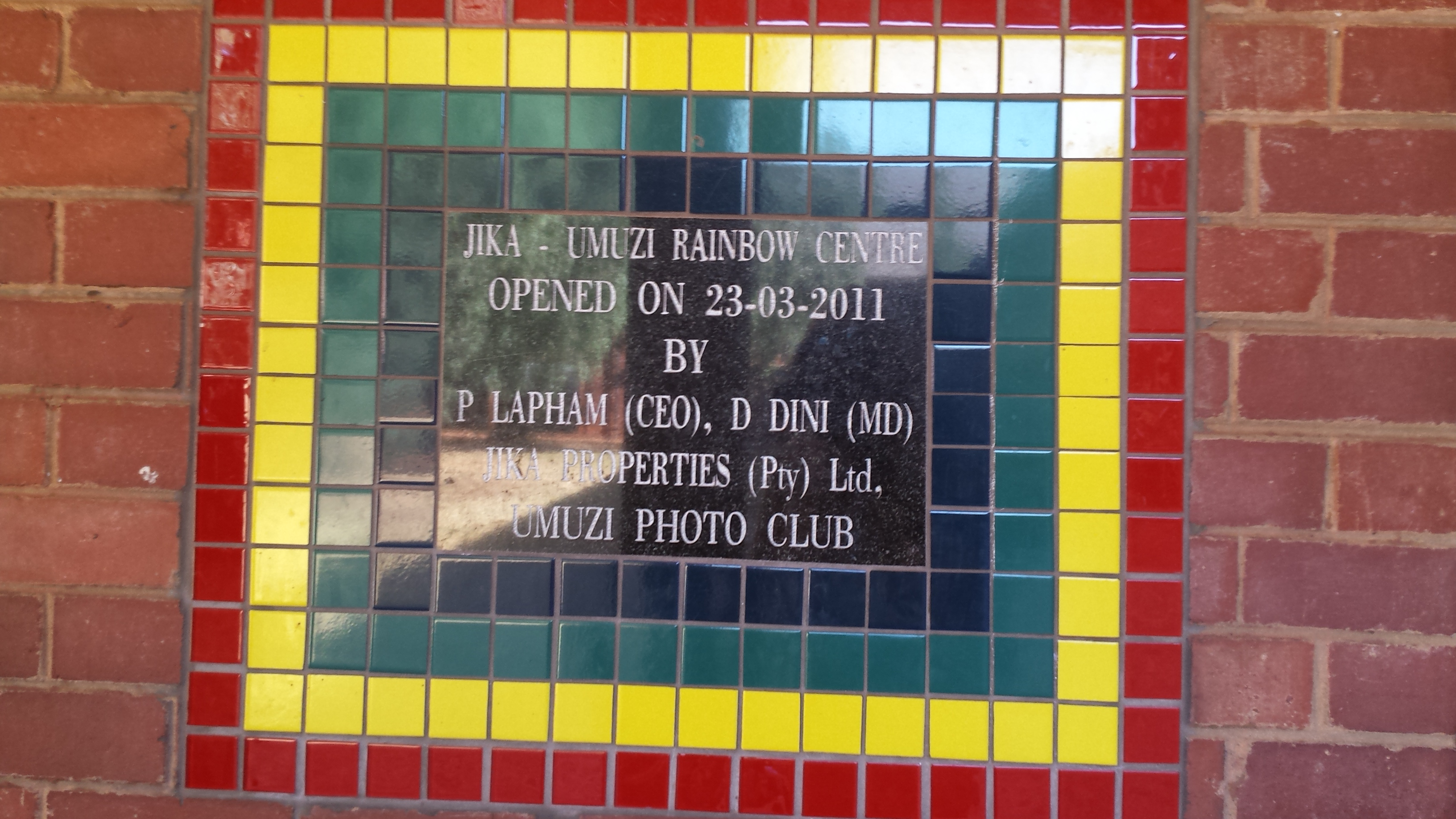
Jika – Umuzi Rainbow Centre, opened on 23-03-2011

- In 1993 on the third of September then Miss South Africa Jacqui Mofokeng, the Junior Mayor and the Mayoress visited Barnato Park High School.
- Umuzi Photo Club, The dialogues created awareness, around the issues of teenage pregnancy with the Grade 9 learners in a creative way. Part of the dialogues focused on the consequences of being a teen parent, while dispelling some of the misconceptions about having unprotected sex.
- Recently two Barnato learners Malaika Elliot Motsoai and Professor Godlo were amongst the boys who won a CERN Beamline for schools to travel to Switzerland for a science experiment.
