= Westdene, Johannesburg =

Westdene
- Location within Gauteng Location within South Africa
- Coordinates: 26.1780°S 27.986°E
- Country: South Africa
- Province: Gauteng
- Municipality: City of Johannesburg
- Main Place: Johannesburg
- Established: 1910

Area
  - Total: 1.91 km^{2} (0.74 sq mi)

Population (2011)
  - Total: 4,909
  - Density: 2,570/km^{2} (6,660/sq mi)

Racial makeup (2011)
  - Black African: 25.75%
  - Coloured: 4.87%
  - Indian/Asian: 4.34%
  - White: 65.04%

First languages (2011)
  - English: 37.42%
  - Afrikaans: 38.03%
  - Zulu: 5.19%
  - Tswana: 5.17%
  - Other: 14.19%
- Time zone: UTC+2 (SAST)
- Postal code (street): 2092
- PO box: 2006
- Area code: 011 and 010

Westdene is a suburb of Johannesburg, South Africa. Westdene lies between the historic suburb of Sophiatown and Melville with the Melville Koppies nature reserve to the north of the suburb. Westdene derives its name from its location, literally meaning west-valley. 'West' since it is located west of the city centre and with 'dene' derived from the Old English denu, meaning valley.

== History ==
Johannesburg in 1902 and the farm Braamfontein. The arrow points to where Westdene would eventually be situated.

=== Before the 20th century ===
Westdene was originally part of the farm Braamfontein, established in the area in 1853. The farm stretched from Westdene in the west to Houghton in the east and from Newtown in the south to Linden in the north. Various parts of the farm were sub-divided and sold many times over and in 1871 Gerhardus Petrus Bezuidenhout sold his south-western portion of the farm to Frans Johannes van Dijk who in turn sold the land to Johannes Jacobus Lindeque in 1884. The portion of land became known as Lindeque's Portion and eventually developed into the present-day suburbs of Auckland Park, Cottesloe and Westdene. Hendrik Wilhelm Struben obtained permission from Lindeque to prospect the area for gold in 1885 but no evidence of gold was discovered. In 1887 Lindeque sold a portion to the then Zuid-Afrikaansche Republiek for 4000 pounds. The government's intention with acquiring the land was to improve the water supply to Johannesburg, but soon the government also laid out the first suburbs on the farm in 1888 and 1889.

=== Early 20th century ===
In 1902 the area to become Westdene was surveyed for the Johannesburg Consolidated Investment Company after the surrounding suburbs of Auckland Park, Melville and Richmond had been proclaimed and established. In 1905 the area was laid out, but Westdene would only formally be established in 1910. In the early 20th century a brickfield was started in the area where the current Westdene dam is located. Albert Edward Wells formed the Wells Brickfield in the area around 1911. The brickfield lay south-west of the Westdene-spruit (or stream).

Early maps of the suburb show two parks, Tighy park and another unknown park that would later become the Westdene recreation centre.

View towards the first established residences along the Westdene streets (Source: Museum Africa)

In 1932 the South African Government decided to abandon the gold standard and the country subsequently experienced a sustained period of economic growth. To meet the growing demand the Wells Brickfield expanded operations which led to the clay quarrying activities in the area creating a number small dams. A map of the area from 1934 depict the dams created as well as the first properties to be built in the area. South of Westdene the original Auckland Park horse racing track can be seen which would later become the Rand Afrikaans University and later the University of Johannesburg.

Map of Westdene from 1934 depicting a number of small dams created by clay quarrying activities in the area.

The brickfield in the area closed in 1943 and the abandoned land was possibly transferred to the Johannesburg city council. The city council would later develop the Westdene Park here. An aerial photograph that was taken in 1952 shows how the number of smaller dams in the area grew to create two distinct dams. The south-west dam was known as "Blue-dam" and the north-east dam "Westdene-dam". These two distinct dams were separated by a small footpath visible on the aerial photograph, but would later merge into one dam and be known simply as Westdene Dam. Further north-east a smaller separate dam would remain, known as "Padda-dam" (or Frog Dam).

Westdene was and remained a white working-class suburb for most of the 20th century.

=== Sophiatown forced removals ===
After the establishment of Soweto in 1923 white working-class neighbours in Westdene and Newlands began asking for the removal of black people in neighbouring Sophiatown. The perception arose that the suburb was too close to white suburbia. Under the Immorality Amendment Act, No 21 of 1950, people of mixed races could not reside together, which made it possible for the government to segregate the different races. In 1955 the government removed black, Indian and coloured families from Sophiatown by force. The area was rezoned for whites only and renamed 'Triomf' (Afrikaans for Triumph) by the government.

According to some accounts "there were mixed feelings in Westdene about their Sophiatown neighbours, with most residents wanting to keep their white exclusivity".

=== Westdene dam disaster ===
On 27 March 1985, a school bus transporting children from Vorentoe High School, left the road as it was crossing the bridge of the Westdene Dam. 30 Children swam to safety or were rescued from the rooftop of the bus. 42 Children were unable to escape the bus and died.

=== 1990s–present ===
Despite the occurrence of so-called "white flight" in the suburbs near the Johannesburg Central Business District after the end of apartheid, and subsequent urban decay, Westdene has remained a suburb with a white majority (as evident from census data).

In 2017 Tighy Park was used as a construction site for Kingsway Civil, a construction company carrying out construction and upgrades around the area. The company agreed to beautify and upgrade the park once construction in the area was complete. Also in 2017 the Westdene Dam (and surrounding park) was closed for several months due to construction on the City of Johannesburg’s Corridors of Freedom project. Both parks have been upgraded since.

With the close proximity to The University of Johannesburg as well as the University of the Witwatersrand and the growing number of students at these institutions, the suburb has recently experienced an influx of students looking for residence. The general shortage of student accommodation in Johannesburg has led to multiple illegal communes reported in the suburb.

== Education ==
Two schools are located in Westdene - West Rand SDA Primary School and Orban School. Both are private primary schools with the latter a double medium (Afrikaans and English) school and the former an English medium school.

While the University of Johannesburg is located in Auckland Park, the university has a number of sport fields and sporting facilities located in Westdene. These include:

- UJ Hockey Field
- UJ Absa Cricket Oval
- UJ Athletics Track
- UJ West Sport facilities

== Westdene Graffiti Project ==
July 2015 saw the start of The Westdene Graffiti Project. A local community initiative by Westdene residents donating their property walls to graffiti artists for street art and murals. The project is aimed at beautifying the suburb and have been quite successful with over 40 murals (to date) scattered around the suburb. Local and foreign tourists now go on walking tours of the suburbs' many murals and street art.

These murals include work by local and international artists. Some of the artists featured:

- Bias
- Bener1
- Dekorone
- Mars
- Norm
- Veronika
- Ryza
- Zesta
- Rekso
- Myza420
- Rasty
- Dekor
