= Kingsway Campus Auckland Park =

Campus of the University of Johannesburg

Coordinates: 26°11′0″S 27°59′56″E

University of Johannesburg Kingsway Campus Auckland Park
- Type: Public university
- Established: 1 January 2005 (by merger of existing institutions)
- Vice-Chancellor: Letlhokwa George Mpedi
- Location: Johannesburg, Gauteng, South Africa
- Campus: Kingsway Campus
- Colours: Orange and white
- Website: www.uj.ac.za

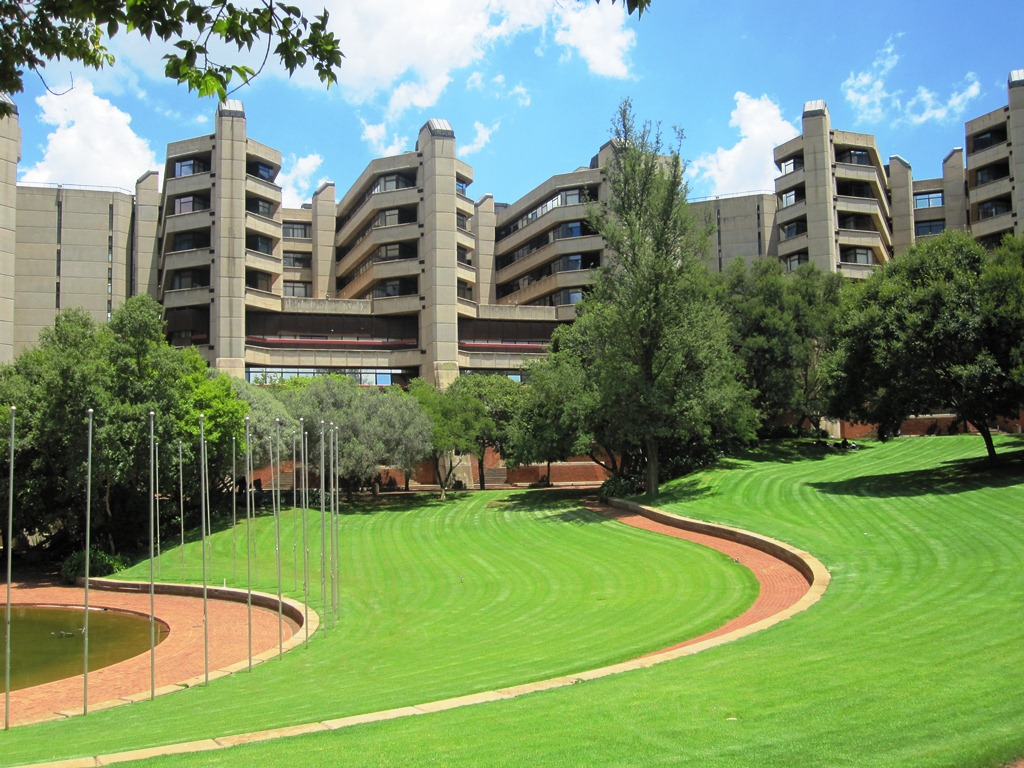
University of Johannesburg, Auckland Park Campus

Kingsway Campus Auckland Park, also known as APK, is the largest and most populated of the four campuses of the University of Johannesburg. It is also the seat of the administration and governance body of the university. The campus was formerly the only educational campus of the Rand Afrikaans University. The campus gets its name from a major Johannesburg road, Kingsway Avenue, that runs along the north-east side of the campus. The roads that form the boundary of the campus are (clock-wise) University Road, Ditton Avenue, Ripley Road, Hampton Avenue, Studente Avenue, Akademie Road and Perth Road. Although the official name of the campus implies that it is in Auckland Park, it actually falls just out of that suburb by one street. It is technically in the suburb of Rossmore with the first-year parking lot bordering the suburb of Melville, Gauteng.

== Campus grounds ==
The layout of the campus's main building is unconventional in that the entire campus is essentially one building. This, in its day, was an architectural feat earning RAU an award from the South African Institute of Architects upon the opening of the campus in 1975, by Dr. Nicolaas Diederichs, first chancellor and State President.

Although a number of architects feel the circular-shaped, concrete and coloured-steel building is a masterpiece, it has just as many critics. The term "Archi-torture" is jokingly used by students and residents of surrounding suburbs alike. See Brutalist architecture § On university campuses.

Regardless of the visual aesthetics, the practicality of the campus is undoubtedly a success. One can walk to any faculty, venue or laboratory within eight minutes. The building has a multipurpose design and may be easily converted to accommodate different needs all within a 48-hour conversion period, for example to that of a hospital.

The building is divided into A Ring, B Ring, C Ring and D Ring. Each ring has a LES, which stands for Lesingslokaal (Afrikaans for Lesson Venue) behind it and a further LAB behind each LES. It works its way outward like a 'flower' of sorts. Each part of the building is seven storeys high. In addition there is an E LES foyer and E Ring which houses the Sanlam Auditorium, Student Media offices (UJFM and The UJ Observer), Campus Health Services and the university societies. Next to D LAB Kelder (Cellar) is the UJ Aquarium.

== Demographics ==
Of the 27 151 students that were enrolled at the Kingsway Campus in 2011, 21 259 were undergraduate students and 5892 were postgraduate.

== Student amenities ==
The campus, when still RAU, was the first to have an on-campus shopping mall, known as the "S.S." which stands for Studente Sentrum (Afrikaans for Student Center), in the Republic of South Africa. RAU also set up Campus Square, a shopping centre serving the suburb of Melville and students living off campus in the nearby neighbourhoods. Campus Square has a large student vibe especially in the evenings, serving students from both Kingsway and Bunting Road Campuses of UJ.

Various buildings surround the main building, added over the years and particularly after the merger, such as the UJ Arts Center, with a gallery, theatre and dance studios as well as B LAB extension for the Faculty of Engineering and the Built Environment. The UJ Law Clinic moved to the location of the previous RAU art gallery.

The Campus has a total of 66 lecture halls equipped with 7787 seats, as well as 24-hour access to several microlaboratories that can facilitate over 1000 students at a time.

=== Venues ===
The Sanlam Auditorium is situated at the Campus and is a popular location for concerts, congresses and meetings, and the graduation ceremonies that are held there every year. In 2005, the university opened its new Arts Centre, which includes an Art Gallery which hosts exhibitions of acclaimed South African contemporary artists. The Arts Centre also has a 435-seater theatre, as well as rehearsal rooms that overlook the city. The theatre is used for both University and outside productions.

=== Transport ===
The University of Johannesburg has its own student shuttle service that transports students between the Doornfontein Campus, Soweto Campus, Kingsway Campus, and Bunting Road Campus. Additionally, all of these campuses are served by Rea Vaya, a bus rapid transit system in Johannesburg.

=== Student residences ===
Kingsway Campus is also the campus with the most student residences. Unique to the campus is the day house policy not followed by any other campus of the university. Under this policy, day-only students have the option of choosing between two fraternities and two sororities. This has helped build camaraderie and provides a space for students to relax and socialize between classes. Sporting competitions as well as cultural shows are entered into by the various day houses. The day houses are Kanniedood (Afrikaans for Cannot Die or Immortals) and Voorendag (Afrikaans for Before the Day or Genesis) for the men and Annierand (Afrikaans for On the Edge) and Alomdraai (Afrikaans for Full-turn or Revolution) for the women.

== Further developments ==
In 2010 construction began on the open property corner University Road and Kingsway Avenue. It is now known that they will house additional residential halls for students.

Future plans were announced in 2008 that a sky rail is planned to link Kingsway Campus with Bunting Road Campus Auckland Park. However this was put on hold indefinitely as funds of R800 million were urgently injected into Soweto Campus, following protests.
