= DISJ =

DISJ may refer to:

- German International School Jeddah (Deutsche Internationale Schule Jeddah)
- Deutsche Internationale Schule Johannesburg
