= Richmond, Johannesburg =

Place in Gauteng, South Africa

Richmond (points of interest)
- Suburb
- Interactive map of Richmond (points of interest)
- Location in Johannesburg
- Coordinates: 26.181°S 28.0145°E
- Country: South Africa
- Province: Gauteng
- Municipality: City of Johannesburg
- Main Place: Johannesburg

Richmond is a small, centrally located suburb in Johannesburg whose Edwardian, Art Deco and Mid Century Modern houses are being both gentrified and torn down.

This region overlooks the suburbs of Westcliff and Parktown North. The area is bordered by Empire Road, Melville and the Auckland Park Johannesburg Country Club.

The suburb of Richmond was established in 1893 or 1896. Located approximately 3.5 km northwest of the city hall, the total of 227 stands that made up this middle class settlement were established on a portion of the Braamfontein Farm that Louw Geldenhuys sold for £300 000. In 1962, the "finest industrial research laboratory" was opened in Richmond. and this suburb was also one of the first sites for Black Entrepreneurs in early Johannesburg. Zulu men from KwaZulu-Natal, members of the AmaWasha (or Zulu Washerment) formed a guild.

Laundry work, among Zulu men, was a prestigious occupation and pay was handsome. The AmaWasha had its history in a precolonial artisanal associations which practiced hide dressing.

In their laundering work, the AmaWasha recalled the specialist craft of hide-dressing. This powerful group of approximately 1200 African washermen, would clean the mining town's dirty laundry. Things began to change with a drought in 1895. In 1902 an American entrepreneur and laundryman, Frank Oscar Nelson established Steam Laundry and competed with two other foreign owned laundry businesses, the Crystal Steam Laundry and the Auckland Park Steam Laundry. However, by 1914, the AmaWasha's efforts had been eclipsed and Rand Steam Laundries, would do the washing, ironing, dying and dry-cleaning of dirty clothes up until 1962.

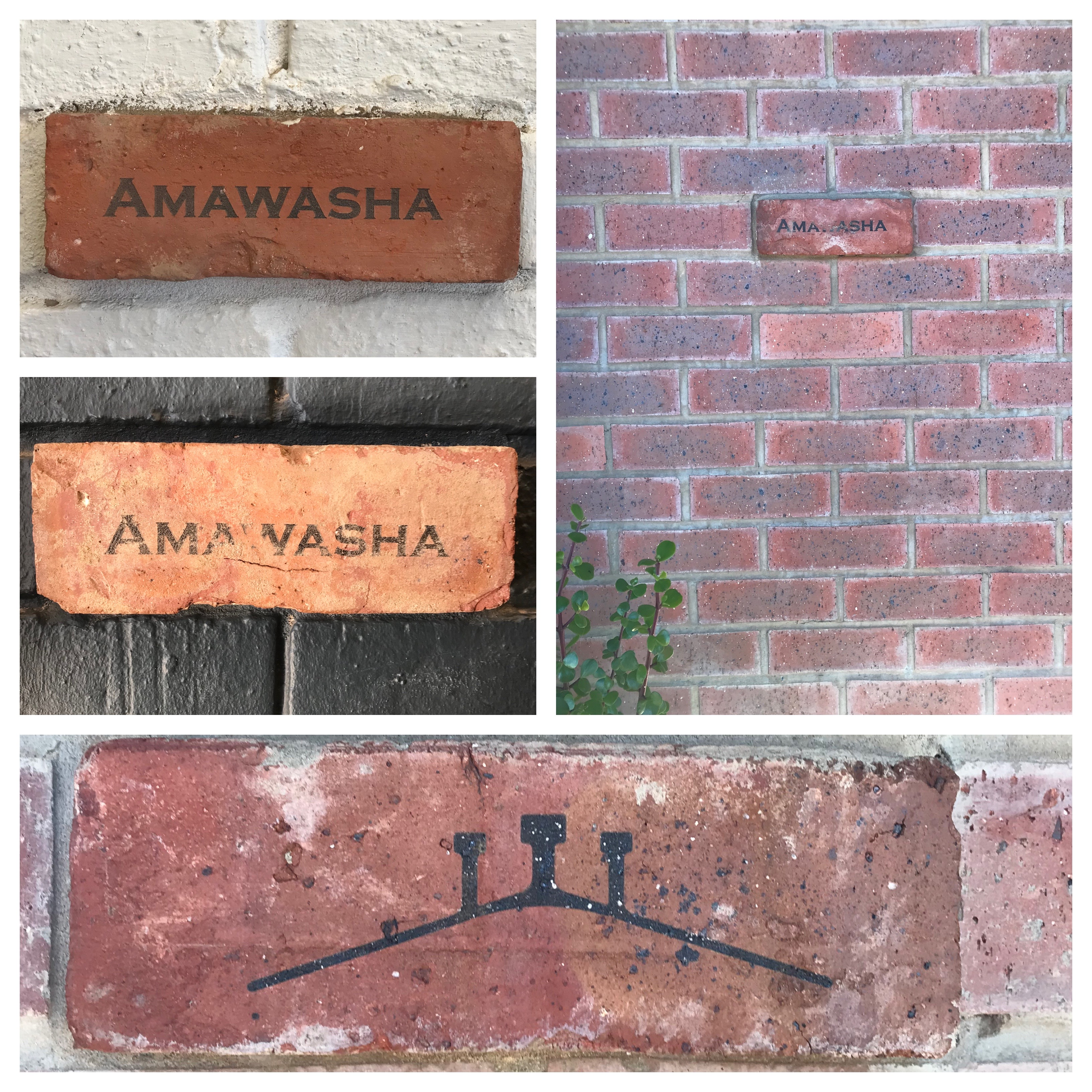
Collage of amawasha bricks, photographed at Rand Steam Shopping Centre

Today, the social history of these early entrepreneurs are recognized in Rand Steam Shopping Centre. While most of the original buildings were illegally demolished in 2008, the remaining structures were declared heritage sites by the Johannesburg Heritage Foundation and amaWasha bricks are inserted into the walls.

Richmond residents have a wide variety of amenities in walking distance including 44 Stanley, Love Books, Rand Steam Shopping Centre and Bamboo Centre and Boxpark inspired 27 Boxes. Soccer sports fields and Melville Koppies maintain an impression of a small highveld town.
