= Bunting Road Campus Auckland Park =

Campus of the University of Johannesburg

University of Johannesburg Bunting Road Campus Auckland Park
- Type: Public university
- Established: January 1, 2005 (by merger of existing institutions)
- Vice-Chancellor: Tshilidzi Marwala
- Location: Johannesburg, Gauteng, South Africa
- Campus: Bunting Road Campus
- Colours: Orange and white
- Website: www.uj.ac.za

Bunting Road Campus Auckland Park, also known as APB, is one of the four urban campuses of the University of Johannesburg. The APB was originally a campus of the Technikon Witwatersrand.

Uniquely, the campus is an enclosed section of a suburb. The main thoroughfare of the suburb is Bunting Road, whose name, according to the City of Johannesburg archives, is derived from a subspecies of bird and not the decorative banner it is currently associated with.

A common misconception, as with Kingsway Campus, is that the campus itself is in Auckland Park. However, it is not technically within the demarcated suburb of Auckland Park, but rather in the suburb of Cottesloe. The roads within the campus are Lark Street, Jay Street, Vista Close, Ibis Street, Katjiepiering Street, Falcon Street and Dorbie Street.

== Faculties ==
The campus is home to the Faculty of Art, Design and Architecture (FADA), as well as the Faculty of Management.

=== Faculty of Art, Design and Architecture ===
FADA has a vibrant 80-year history and serves approximately 1200 students who work and study in the FADA building, which has many facilities integrated into it, such as workshops, studios, computer laboratories, common lecture venues, auditorium, gallery, Bus stop campus kahle kahle and library. FADA is divided into eight departments: Architecture, Fashion Design, Graphic Design, Industrial Design, Interior Design, Jewellery Design and Manufacture, Multimedia, and Visual Art.

=== The College Of Business and Economics ===
The College of Business and Economics operates on the Auckland Park Kingsway Campus, the Auckland Park Bunting Road Campus and the Soweto Campus.The CBE consists of 7 schools (housing 12 departments):

• The Johannesburg Business School

• School of Accounting

• School of Consumer Intelligence and Information Systems

• School of Economics

• School of Management

• School of Public Management, Governance and Public Policy

• School of Tourism and Hospitality

== Demographics ==
Of the 9255 students enrolled at the Bunting Road Campus in 2011, 9177 were undergraduate students and only 78 were postgraduate.

== Student amenities ==
When on campus the visual impression one gets is not of an education institution but rather that of a middle class South African suburb, as is the case with the surrounding suburbs. The Bunting Road Campus has two entrances. The east and main entrance is located on Annet Road (M71) and the west entrance is located on Canary street, opposite the SABC Headquarters, in Auckland Park.

The campus has a total of 55 lecture halls equipped with 4412 seats.

The university's radio station UJFM is also located on the Bunting Road Campus.

Located within the campus is a Netcare Clinic which, along with the Faculty of Health Sciences of Doornfontein Campus, serves the City of Johannesburg.

Opposite Lark Street on Bunting Road is the Cottesloe Boer Memorial, National Monument.

=== Restaurants ===
Several restaurants can be found at the Bunting Road Campus, thanks to School of Tourism and Hospitality Management, which falls under the Faculty of Management. Restaurants here include the Design Café, the Waterford Restaurant, and the Bistro.

=== Venues ===
The campus is home to the Con Cowan Building, which is where the fully equipped, 180-seat Con CowanTheatre is also situated, and the Great Hall, which can accommodate up to 550 people and is a popular location for concerts, prize-giving ceremonies, exhibitions, and meetings. The Great Hall is also used for examinations. Other venues can be found within the Kerzner Building, which is under the jurisdiction of the School of Tourism and Hospitality. The Kerzner Building is a R20 million building where the training of hospitality and tourism students takes place.

=== Transport ===
The University of Johannesburg has its own shuttle service that transports students between the Doornfontein Campus, Soweto Campus, Kingsway Campus, and Bunting Road Campus. Additionally, all of these campuses are served by Rea Vaya, a bus rapid transit system in Johannesburg.

=== Student residences ===
The campus has five residences, Horizon and Ndlovukazi for undergraduate females, Kilimanjaro for undergraduate males, and Goudstad Flats and Mayine, mixed-gender residences for postgraduate students.

The Kilimanjaro Junior Men's Residence is located on-site in Cottesloe. It can accommodate up to 310 junior male students from the Bunting Road campus. It is an eleven-floor high rise that has five sharing rooms and 21 single rooms on each floor. The residence is managed by the residence manager and staffed by eleven floor representatives (one representative per floor), full-time security, and six full-time cleaners.

The Mayine Mixed Senior Residence on campus an integrated residence for both male and female students. Although third-year students may also live here, the residence primarily houses students who are busy with postgraduate degrees, such as Bachelor of Technology and Honours degrees. It also accommodates sports students of the campus as well as members of the campus' SRC. The building has seven blocks with 88 units, each outfitted with a kitchen to facilitate self-catering. Students formerly from the junior residences Kilimanjaro, Horizon, and Ndlovukazi typically form a large part of the population of the Mayine Mixed Senior residence. It can accommodate up to 338 students who, depending on their academic performance, are assigned to either single or double room flats. Postgraduate students have priority when it comes to placing students into single rooms, while undergraduate students are often placed into double rooms.

At the Ikhayalethu Day-House, day students of the University of Johannesburg's Bunting Road Campus can gather.
