= Germany–Saudi Arabia relations =

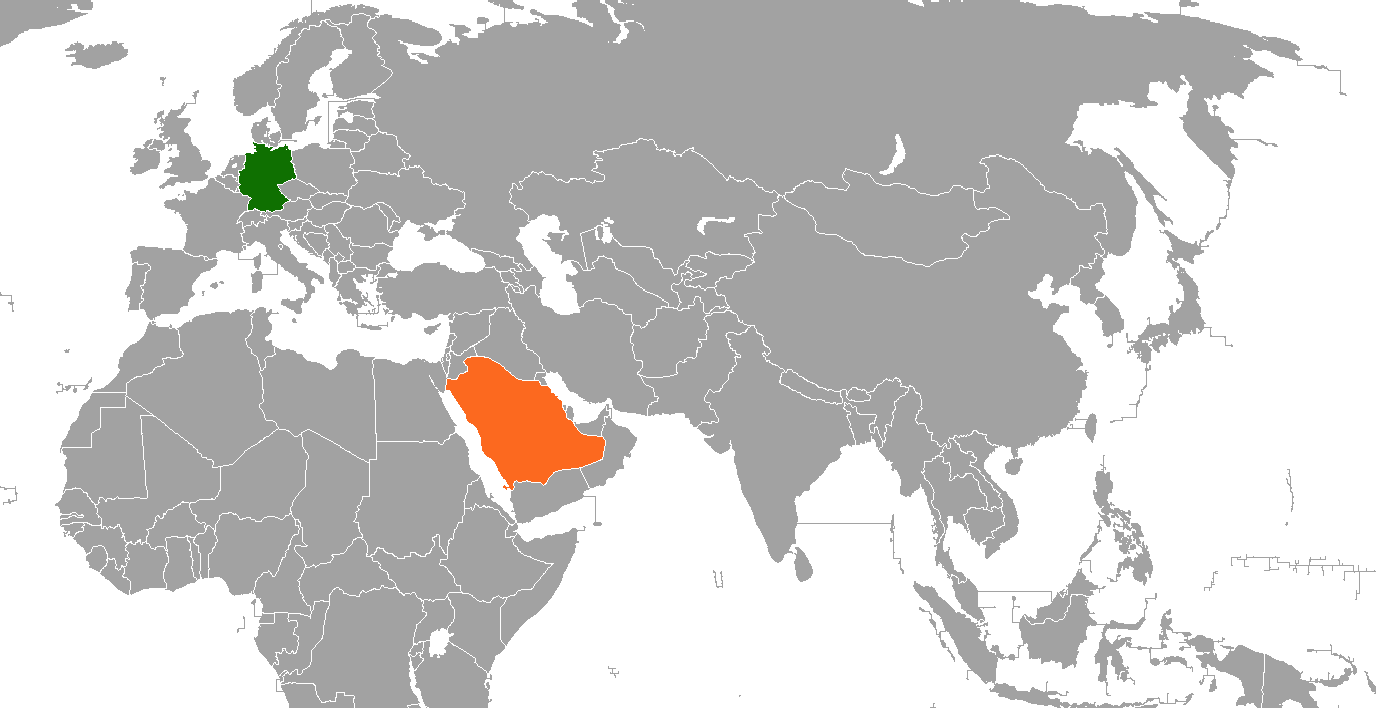

- Germany: Saudi Arabia

Diplomatic mission
- Embassy of Germany, Riyadh: Embassy of Saudi Arabia, Berlin

Germany–Saudi Arabia relations refers to the international relations between Germany and Saudi Arabia. Both countries have established a pragmatic partnership centered mainly on economic interests. Saudi Arabia is the second most important trading partner for Germany in the Middle East. The German government regards Saudi Arabia as a partner, as the country can be a moderating influence on radical forces in the Middle East conflict.

== History ==
Relations between Saudi Arabia and Germany were formed as early as 1929, with the signing of a treaty between the Weimar Republic and the Kingdom of Hejaz and Nejd. The relations between the Federal Republic of Germany and Saudi Arabia were established in 1954.

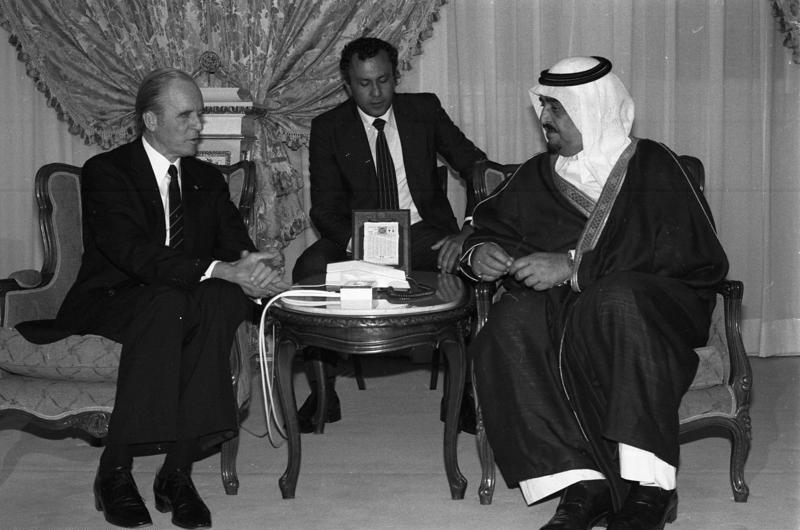
German politician Karl Carstens visiting King Fahd in Saudi Arabia (1982)

From May 29 to 31, 1976, the then German Chancellor Helmut Schmidt traveled to Saudi Arabia for talks with the then Crown Prince Fahd ibn Abd al-Aziz. The Saudi Arabian Foreign Minister Saud ibn Faisal visited Germany on July 29/30 and in September 1978, for talks with German Foreign Minister Hans-Dietrich Genscher and for talks with Schmidt in January 1978. During a further visit by Schmidt to Saudi Arabia in the summer of 1980, he promised King Khalid ibn Abd al-Aziz that he would carefully examine his request for arms deliveries and informed him and Fahd during a visit on April 27, 1981 that Germany would not deliver arms. The refusal did not lead to diplomatic disgruntlement, but Fahd once again sought talks on the subject by stopping over in Bonn on his way back from the North-South summit in Cancun in October 1981. The German government under Helmut Kohl decided in 1983 not to supply the weapon system Leopard 2 to a potential enemy of Israel.

On November 7, 2007, Saudi Arabia's King Abdullah ibn Abd al-Aziz was received with military honors at the German Chancellery in Berlin. He met with Angela Merkel, Federal President Köhler and Frank-Walter Steinmeier for talks. The following day, Abdullah visited the Brandenburg Gate together with Berlin's governing mayor Klaus Wowereit and then signed the city's Golden Book at the Rotes Rathaus. The king tipped the officers of his police escort, provided by the Berlin police, with 24,000 US dollars.

German Chancellor Angela Merkel visited the kingdom in April 2017. Merkel concluded an agreement on the training of Saudi Arabian military personnel by the German Bundeswehr. Furthermore, Siemens signed an infrastructure agreement in which the company agreed to support Saudi Arabia with projects. At the meeting, Merkel criticized the Saudi military intervention in Yemen.

In June 2017, a 56-year-old cyclist was killed in a traffic accident with a Saudi Arabian diplomat in Neukölln, Berlin. The 51-year-old driver of a Porsche Cayenne was parked in a no-parking zone and opened the driver's door. The cyclist was hit by the door and later died of his head injuries. The Federal Foreign Office subsequently demanded a statement from Saudi Arabia. The Saudi Embassy in Berlin told the Tagesspiegel: “It was with great dismay that we learned of the tragic traffic accident in Neukölln. We are in close contact with the Federal Foreign Office. On behalf of the Saudi embassy, we would like to express our deepest condolences to the relatives of the deceased”. Criminal proceedings could not be initiated due to the diplomat's immunity.

== Controversies ==
=== Funding of mosques ===
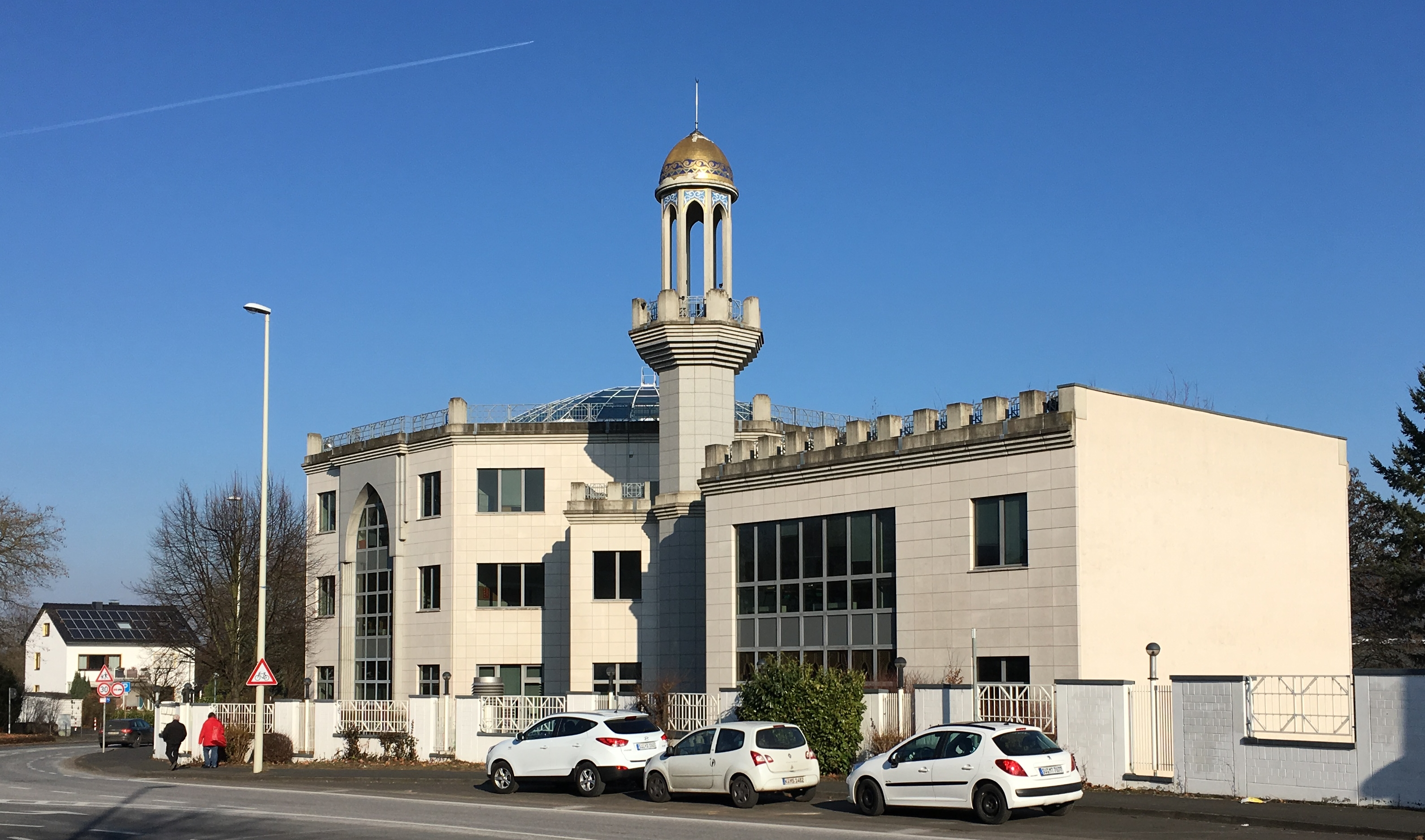
The construction of the King Fahd Academy in Germany was funded by Saudi Arabia.

Saudi Arabia funds the construction and maintenance of several mosques in Germany. Several politicians have alleged that the Saudi-funded mosques are a "breeding ground for Islamic extremism".

=== Arms exports ===
Germany was one of the top weapons exporters to Saudi Arabia, with an export volume of 450 million Euros in the third fiscal quarter of 2017. In 2018, after the murder of Jamal Khashoggi, Germany halted arms exports to Saudi Arabia, which has strained relations. Germany later resumed arms exports to Saudi Arabia in 2024.

== Diaspora ==
=== German diaspora in Saudi Arabia ===
There is a small community of Germans working in Saudi Arabia, as a number of German companies have a presence in the kingdom. The German International School in Jeddah and German International School in Riyadh cater to the educational needs of the children of diplomats, as well as the diaspora.

=== Saudi diaspora in Germany ===
There is a small Saudi diaspora in Germany, which includes mostly students and few individual women refugees who have fled the kingdom due to its patriarchical laws.

== Economic ties ==
Between 1980 and 1982, Saudi Arabia granted loans to Germany totaling 23 billion marks, more than any other country at the time. The Saudi-German Economic Investment Company (SAGECO) was founded in 1982 to promote mutual investment. The German-Saudi Arabian Liaison Office for Economic Affairs in Riyadh (GESALO) is part of the global network of German chambers of industry and commerce and aims to promote economic relations, scientific and technological progress and cooperation between the two countries.

In 2006, around 220 German companies were active in the Kingdom. The volume of trade between the two countries amounted to around eight billion in 2011 and grew to around ten billion euros in 2012. In 2023, the trade volume stood at 10.4 billion euros.

German companies are cooperating with Saudi Arabia on various infrastructure projects, including the construction of Neom and the realization of Saudi Vision 2030. Both countries also work together in the development of renewable energy resources, like green hydrogen, where both countries signed a memorandum of understanding on cooperation.

== Cultural ties ==
On April 2, 2006, an intergovernmental agreement on bilateral cultural cooperation between the two countries came into force and marked the beginning of mutual cultural exchange.

The 2019 film The Perfect Candidate is the first example of a major Saudi-German coproduction.

=== Education ===
The King Fahd Academy in Bonn, which was financed by Saudi Arabia, was founded in 1995 and closed in summer 2017. It opened a branch in Berlin in 2000. As part of a scholarship program run by King Abdullah ibn Abd al-Aziz, 600 Saudi Arabian students came to Germany. Saudi Arabian students also attend summer courses in Germany.

There are two German schools in Saudi Arabia: The German International School Jeddah and the German School Riyadh. One lecturer from the German Academic Exchange Service works at Effat University in Jeddah and one at King Saud University in Riyadh.

== Resident diplomatic missions ==
- Germany has an embassy in Riyadh and consulate-general in Jeddah.
- Saudi Arabia has an embassy in Berlin.
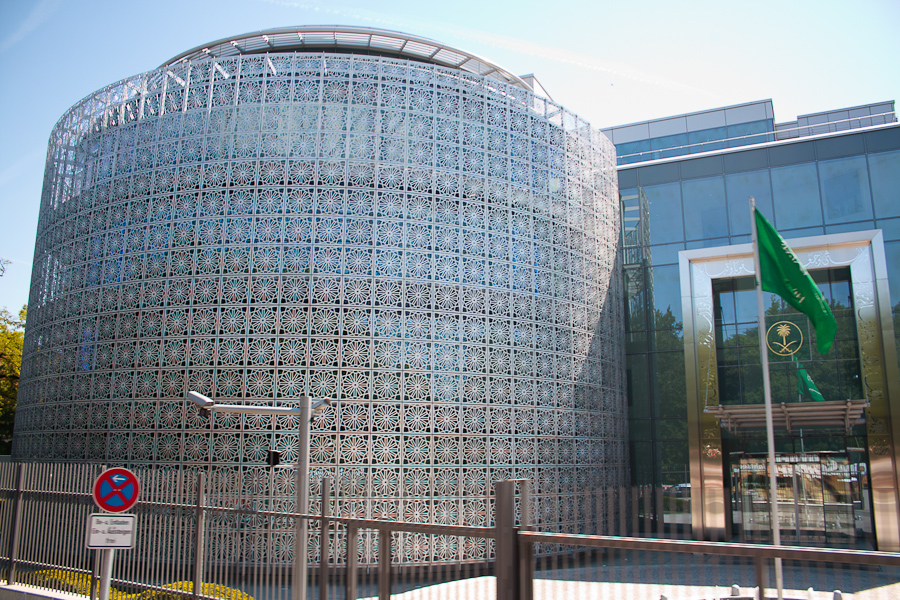
Embassy of the Saudi Arabia in Berlin

== See also ==
- Foreign relations of Germany
- Foreign relations of Saudi Arabia
- 2024 Magdeburg car attack
