= Lindfield House =

Coordinates: 26°11′07″S 28°00′29″E

Lindfield House is a South African Victorian museum in Auckland Park, Johannesburg Metropolitan Municipality, built circa 1909–1910. The first owners of the house were a Dr and Mrs Stanwell, who lived there until 1924. The house is named after a village in England.

Herbert Baker is said to be the designer of the house. Its original plans have been lost. The second owner was Henry O'Kelly Webber, a past president of the Chamber of Mines. He greatly enlarged the house, getting A.J. Marshall to design the plans. Marshall worked with Baker and afterwards had his own practice. An extra room was added in 1933 which was designed by Nelly Edwards, the first woman architect in Johannesburg.

The third owner was Donald Relton Austin, an engineer, who bought the house in 1944. Then in the 1950s the house was owned by Peter Laband, a stockbroker.
