= Kingsway Mansions, Johannesburg =

Kingsway mansions
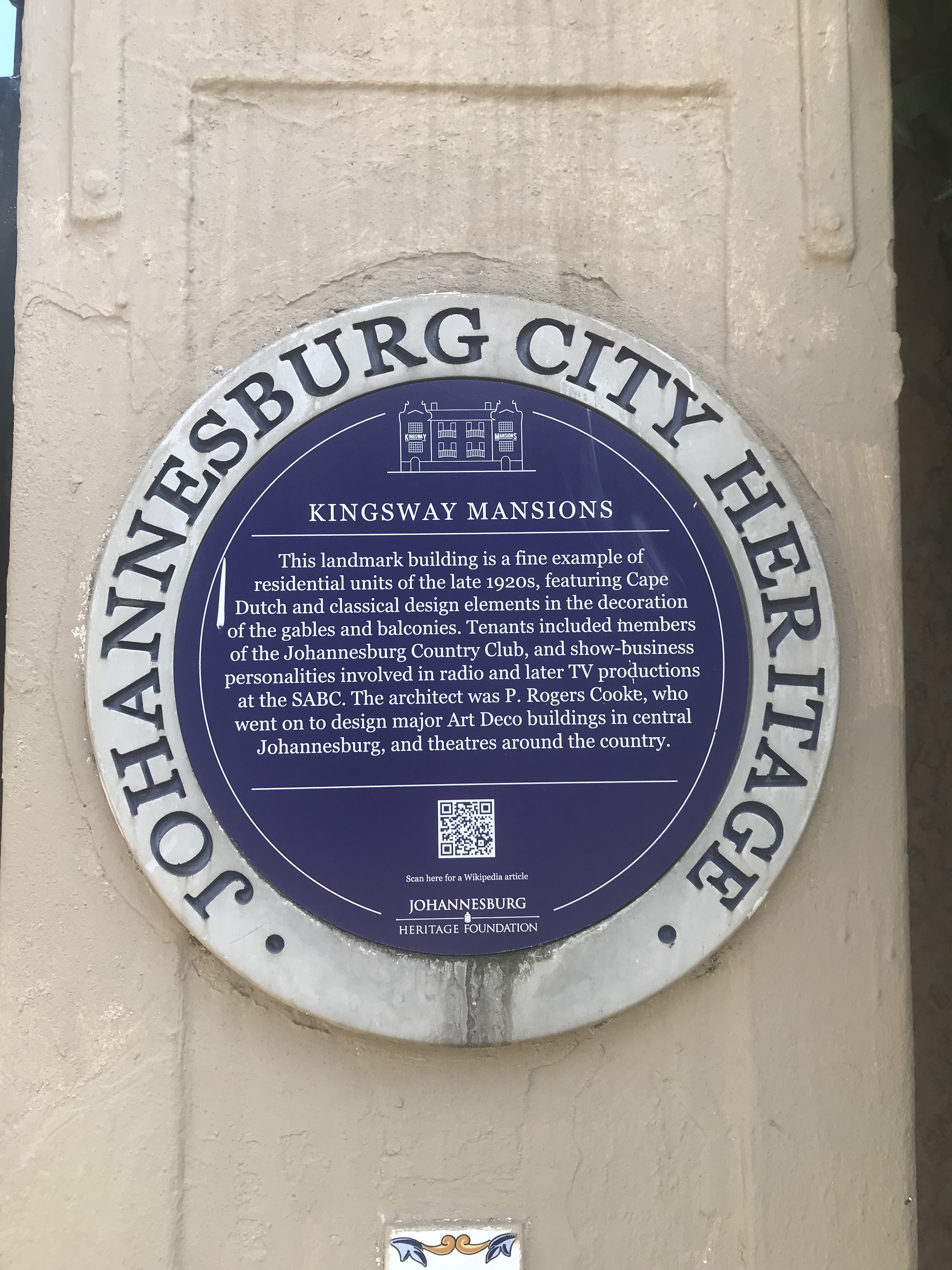
- Kingsway Mansions Blue Plaque

General information
- Status: Completed
- Type: Residential building
- Location: Aukland park, Johannesburg
- Completed: circa 1928

Height
- Roof: 102 metres (335 ft)

Technical details
- Floor count: 3

Design and construction
- Architect: P. Rogers Cooke

Kingsway Mansions is a three-story apartment block dating back from 1928 that has Cape Dutch and classical design elements in the decoration of the balconies and the gables along the main façade towards Kingsway Avenue. The building has 27 units with 21 of its apartments being 100 square metres and the remaining 6 ‘studios” 65 square metres each.

== History ==
Kingsway Mansions takes its name from the road which it faces, which was once lined with tall blue gum trees. The building was designed by the prominent architect P. Rogers Cook who with the practice of J.C. Cooke and Cowan was responsible for an impressive collection of Art Deco buildings in central Johannesburg and for a number of theatres and movie houses including The Playhouse in Durban and Capital Theatre in Pretoria.

The intended extension of the wings on the undeveloped land adjacent to Kingsway Mansions was never carried out, and the main entrance was positioned on the western side of Henley Road to give easy access to the property.

For many years, the tenants included members of the Johannesburg Country Club, whose main entrance was directly across the road. When the SABC moved from the city centre to Auckland Park, tenants reflected the convenience for broadcasters, announcers, actors, and show-business people involved in radio and later TV productions. Among the people who have lived there over the years have been scriptwriter Dannie Folbeck, TV presenter Donna Werzel, actor Richard Haines, the actor / director Robert Whitehead, musician John Oakley Smith, publisher Ivan Beek and art gallery owner Trent Reed. The present tenant profile includes SABC executives, university lecturers and other professionals.

== Current ownership ==
The current owner, Patrick Corben, purchased this “rent controlled” block in 1990, from Lionel Waldman whose family had previously owned the building for some 40 years. Mr Corben also purchased the adjacent house at 77 Richmond Avenue, to ensure that the site was not developed to the detriment of Kingsway Mansions.
