= DSJ =

DSJ may refer to:

- Dennis Smith Jr. (born 1997), American basketball player
- Deutsche Internationale Schule Johannesburg, one of the oldest schools in Johannesburg, South Africa
- DoG Street Journal, a news magazine written by students at the College of William & Mary in Williamsburg, Virginia, USA
- DSJ, the Indian Railways station code for Delhi Safdarjung railway station, Delhi, India
