= Love Books =

Bookshop and salon in Melville, Johannesburg, South Africa

Coordinates: 26.1744803°S 28.0135790°E

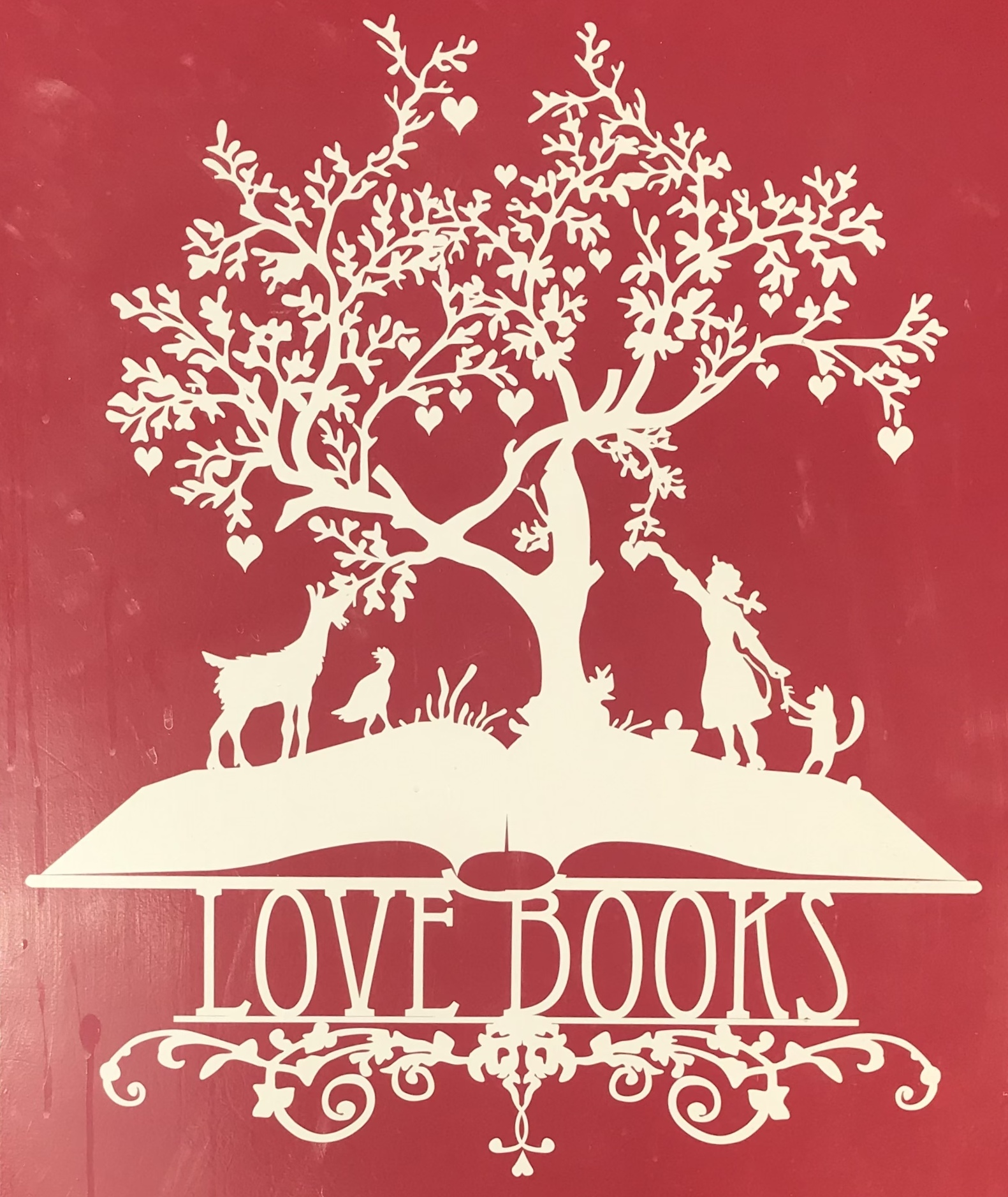
- Industry: Bookshop
- Founded: 2009; 17 years ago
- Founders: Kate Rogan; Jaci Jenkins
- Headquarters: 53 Rustenburg Road, Melville, Johannesburg, South Africa
- Website: lovebooks.co.za

Love Books is an independent bookshop located in Melville, Johannesburg. It was founded in 2009 by Jaci Jenkins and Kate Rogan. The business offers works by local authors, and hosts book launches as well as sponsored literary discussions. It also often works in collaboration with neighbouring coffee shops to spotlight new authors and their works. Love Books was founded with the aim of countering elitism in the literary sphere by establishing an accessible and egalitarian environment. It was awarded 'Best Independent Bookseller' at the Sefika Publishers Awards in 2019.
