= Auckland Park Academy of Excellence =

Private school in Johannesburg, South Africa

Coordinates: 26°12′6.90″S 28°1′23.10″E

- Johannesburg, South Africa, Gauteng

Information
- Type: Private school
- Established: 2011
- Founder: Nazeer Talia, Yunus Gangat, Shoyeb Manjra
- School board: Nazeer Talia, Yunus Gangat, Faheem Mahomed, Mohammed Gangat, Asif Moosa, Fatima Talia, Sikander Wadvalla
- Principal: Mrs Radiyya Wadvalla
- Enrollment: ±500
- Website: http://www.apax.co.za/

The Auckland Park Academy of Excellence is a Muslim school situated in Auckland Park, Johannesburg, South Africa. The school was established at the beginning of the academic year in 2011. The school's secular curriculum is based on the National Curriculum as stipulated by the Department of Education of the Republic of South Africa. APAX also offers its learners an Islamic curriculum.

== Phases ==
As of 2017, the Auckland Park Academy of Excellence comprises grades 1 to 12. These are known as the Foundation, Intermediate and FET(Further Education and Training) Phases. Having started off with grades 1 to 6 in 2011, the school has added an additional grade each academic year until 2017.
