= UJ Observer (campus newspaper) =

- Type: Student newspaper
- Format: Print
- Owner: University of Johannesburg
- Publisher: University of Johannesburg
- Language: English
- Headquarters: Johannesburg, South Africa
- Circulation: 8,000–10,000 (as of 2009)
- Readership: approx. 15,000 (as of 2009)

The UJ Observer is an official student newspaper of the University of Johannesburg (UJ) in Johannesburg, South Africa. The publication serves as an on-the-job training and a communication platform for the university's students.

It is primarily run by students, who serve as reporters, editors and contributors and distributed in print to all five campuses of the university.
