= The Country Club Johannesburg =

Country club in Johannesburg, South Africa

Coordinates: 26°03′02″S 28°04′45″E

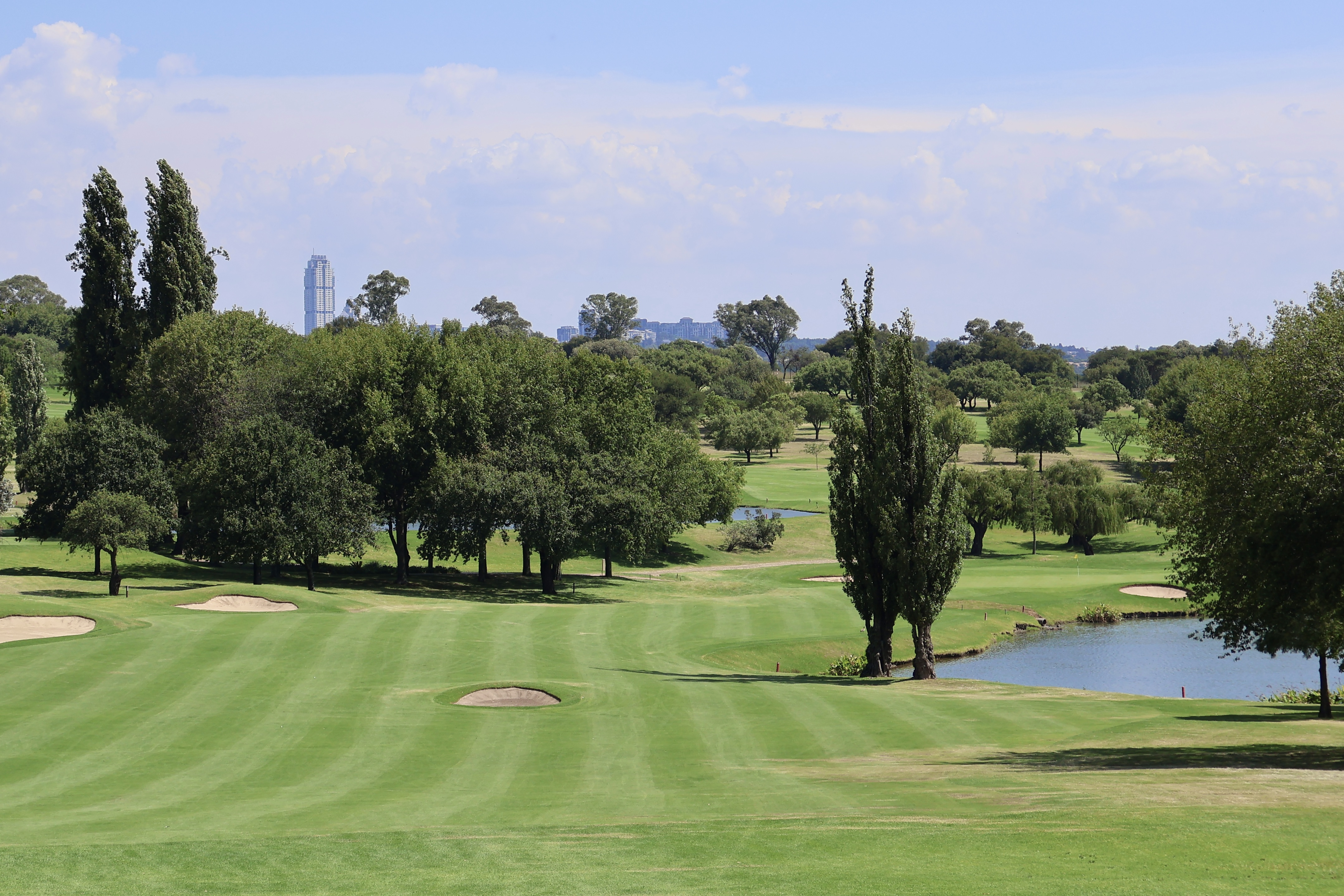
- The Country Club Johannesburg – Woodmead Course (Hole No. 17)
- Interactive map of The Country Club Johannesburg

Club information
- Location: Johannesburg, Gauteng, South Africa
- Established: 1906; 120 years ago
- Type: Private
- Tota holes: 36
- Website: https://thecountryclub.co.za/

Woodmead
- Designed by: Fred W. Hawtree (1968)
- Par: 72
- Length: 6,803 meters
- Course rating: 75.2

Rocklands
- Designed by: Martin Hawtree (1992)
- Par: 72
- Length: 6,813 meters
- Course rating: 74.8

The Country Club Johannesburg (CCJ) is a 36-hole golf complex located in Johannesburg, Gauteng, South Africa.

Established in 1906, the club operates two main locations: the Auckland Park and Woodmead. Both offer a variety of recreational, sports, and social activities.

== History ==
The idea for the club was proposed by land developers John Landau and Charles Cohen to attract residential buyers to the newly formed area of Auckland Park.

The club was officially established on 17 November 1906, and the Auckland Park Clubhouse opened on 22 December that year. At the time, William Kidger Tucker, then the Mayor of Johannesburg noted the event's "great social significance for Johannesburg, the Transvaal colony, and South Africa". The Rand Daily Mail praised the club's grounds, describing them as far more than "picturesque". The club officially opened with 400 members, and within a year, membership doubled. By 1930, the club had over 2,600 members.

The original clubhouse was built on the site of the Lindeque Farm, which included a wooded area of 30 acres and an additional 18 acres adjoining. The club's facilities initially included squash courts, tennis courts, a swimming pool, croquet lawns, and a cricket pitch. Polo and hunting were also popular activities among the expatriate community.

In the 1960s, the club faced potential expropriation when the government planned to establish an Afrikaans university on its grounds, which would eventually become Rand Afrikaans University (RAU) and later the University of Johannesburg. To preserve the club's legacy, the committee decided to sell the land used for the golf course but managed to retain the Auckland Park Clubhouse and its surrounding area. This decision led to the acquisition of farmland in Woodmead, where a new golf course and club were developed.

== Sports ==
=== Golf ===
The Country Club Johannesburg offers two 18-hole championship golf courses, Woodmead and Rocklands.

==== Woodmead course ====
Opened in 1968, Woodmead is a parkland-style course featuring tree-lined fairways and carefully maintained greens. The course is planted with Kikuyu grass on the tees, fairways, and semi-rough, while the greens are constructed to USGA specifications and seeded with L93 Bentgrass. Woodmead blends into its woodland surroundings and includes water features and diverse bird species. A halfway house, known as the Sandwedge, serves golfers during their rounds.

==== Rocklands course ====
Rocklands, established in 1992, offers a more rugged experience with natural grasslands, rock formations, and indigenous trees such as Buffalo-thorn, Wild Olive, and Kiepersol. The course, like Woodmead, uses Kikuyu grass for the tees, fairways, and semi-rough, with Penn A1 and Penn A4 Bentgrass on the greens, which are also built to USGA standards. Rocklands provides sweeping views of Johannesburg and the Magaliesberg mountain range.

==== Mashie course ====
In addition to the main courses, The Country Club Johannesburg features a 9-hole Mashie course at Woodmead. The Mashie course is designed for family fun and beginners, with hole distances ranging from 60 to 150 metres. This course also serves as a practice facility for junior and regular golfers to improve their short game.

=== Other sports ===
==== Bowls ====
Bowls are played at Auckland Park, with a shorter, one-hour format for those with limited time.

==== Cricket ====
Auckland Park's cricket oval was built in 1962, while the Woodmead facility features a newer pitch with scenic views. The Club's cricket season runs from September to April, with social teams, the Goblins and Staggerers, participating in regular matches. Cricket nets are available at both Auckland Park and Woodmead.

==== Croquet ====
The Country Club Johannesburg offers four full-size croquet lawns at Auckland Park, all equipped with floodlights. The Lawn Croquet Club was reintroduced in 1997 and is now one of the strongest in South Africa.

==== Cycling ====
Woodmead and Auckland Park provide opportunities for cycling through both urban scenery and natural settings.

==== Gym ====
Gym facilities are available at both Woodmead and Auckland Park, offering equipment, fitness classes such as Pilates and yoga, and personal trainers. Both locations have steam rooms, saunas, and showers in the changing rooms. The gym is accredited by Discovery Vitality and Momentum Multiply.

==== Padel ====
The club has nine padel courts with astroturf surfaces, with three courts at Auckland Park and six at Woodmead. The sport is played by individuals of various skill levels.

==== Pickleball ====
Played at Auckland Park, pickleball is a paddle sport that combines elements of badminton, table tennis, and tennis. Courts are located at the Tennis Courts.

==== Running ====
Both Auckland Park and Woodmead feature running trails, with Woodmead offering routes within its golf courses, and Auckland Park providing a forested option.

==== Squash ====
Squash is a prominent sport at the Club, with facilities at both Auckland Park and Woodmead. The Club also hosts national tournaments, including the SA National Doubles and Jesters U23.

==== Swimming ====
Auckland Park features a 30-metre pool built in 1906, while Woodmead offers a 25-metre pool popular for training. Both pools are available year-round, with a children's paddling pool at Woodmead.

==== Tennis ====
The Club offers tennis facilities at Auckland Park, with eight courts (four floodlit), and Woodmead, with six floodlit courts. Various events, including social and league play, are held regularly.
