= Corridors of Freedom =

The Corridors of Freedom was an urban spatial transformation initiative launched in May 2013 by Mayor Parks Tau in his state of the city address. The stated aim of the project was to reverse the legacy of colonial and apartheid-era spatial planning legislation. and offer Johannesburg residents, inclusionary transit-oriented development.

== Key Objectives and Features ==
The initiative was focused on linking communities through three transport arteries, known as the Rea Vaya Bus Rapid Transit (BRT) system. The initiative identified three key corridors to connect previously segregated areas to the inner city.

1. Louis Botha Corridor: Linking Johannesburg inner city to Alexandra and Sandton.
2. Empire-Perth Corridor: Linking the inner city to Westbury, Sophiatown, and Noordgesig.
3. Turffontein Corridor: Connecting the inner city to the southern suburbs.

Assurances were given that the heritage sites along these corridors would be preserved. Cycling lanes and pedestrian bridges and walkways would reduce the use of private cars

== Background ==
When Johannesburg was built after the discovery of gold in 1886, the town was a 15 minute city. Residents in work class neighbourhoods could get where they needed to, by foot or with trains or trams. Urban sprawl made this impossible and a concept of the 15 minute city was introduced and championed by Columbian-French urbanist Carlos Moreno and implemented in Capetown. The intent of 15 minute cities was to make it possible to live, work, shop, educate and be entertained. Decentralisation would address environmental, social, and health issues.

== Evolution and Challenges ==
While successful in connecting some areas with new, high-quality infrastructure, the project was undertaken in haste for political reasons and consultation between the residents and the city was limited and residents were treated as passive recipients of change, which meant that the needs of the poorest residents in Gauteng were not addressed.
