= University of Johannesburg =

Public university in South Africa

- Universiteit van Johannesburg (Afrikaans)
- Former name: Randse Afrikaanse Universiteit (Rand Afrikaans University) (1967–2004)
- Motto: Diens Deur Kennis (Afrikaans)
- Motto in English: Service Through Knowledge
- Type: Public university
- Established: 1 January 2005; 21 years ago
- Academic affiliations: AAU; ACU; FOTIM; SACU; HESA; Universitas 21
- Chancellor: Phumzile Mlambo-Ngcuka
- Vice-Chancellor: Letlhokwa George Mpedi
- Principal: Olaotse Leadership Monchwe
- Academic staff: 1,384 permanent and 3,928 temporary (2024)
- Students: 50,274 (2024)
- Undergraduates: 41,229 (2024)
- Postgraduates: 13,296 (2024)
- Doctoral students: 2,297 (2024)
- Location: Johannesburg, Gauteng, South Africa; 26.1834°S 27.9988°E
- Campus: 45,000 square metres (11 acres)
- Colours: Orange; Yellow; White
- Nickname: UJ
- Mascot: University of Johannesburg Hoopoe "Hoepie"
- Website: uj.ac.za

The University of Johannesburg is a public university located in Johannesburg, South Africa. It was formed on 1 January 2005 as the result of a merger between the Rand Afrikaans University, Technikon Witwatersrand and the Soweto campus of Vista University.

In 2024, UJ had a student population of more than 54,000, of whom 4,251 were international students.

== History ==
=== Early developments ===
==== British era, 1900s ====
During the Johannesburg gold rush, training institutions were founded to supply skilled labour to the gold mines. One was the Witwatersrand Technical Institute, founded in 1903, with roots in the Kimberly School of Mines. It became Technikon Witwatersrand in 1979. Its admission policies were limited to white students proficient in English.

==== Independence, 1960s ====
It would take more than thirty years before complete independence of South Africa from Britain was achieved. Following its election in 1948 the National Party sought to provide education in the Afrikaans language, the third most spoken mother-tongue language in South Africa. This led to the foundation of Rand Afrikaans University (RAU) in 1966. At the time of its founding, RAU was the second university to be established in Johannesburg and it was established through an act of parliament as the academic hub for Afrikaners. After the fall of Apartheid in 1994, African students started to become more involved in previously white institutions of higher education. RAU was no exception as for the first time in 1995, it had the largest number of African students in its ranks, followed by the University of the Witwatersrand, Rhodes University and the University of Cape Town.

In 1982, Vista University admitted the first black students in designated urban black settlements across South Africa. It was established in Port Elizabeth. It had seven satellite campuses throughout South African townships, making tertiary education accessible to most African people, and it had its first academic year in 1983.

=== Recent history ===
It was hoped that a modern university would spring from unification, and not separation, as in the past. The University of Johannesburg, established on 1 January 2005, is the result of the incorporation of the East Rand and Soweto campuses of Vista University into the Rand Afrikaans University (RAU). The merger of the modified RAU and the Technikon Witwatersrand took place on 1 January 2005 thus creating the University of Johannesburg.

The integration of these institutions – with seemingly more differences than similarities, offers an identity and character to the University of Johannesburg, which serves to bridge the chasms that previously divided South Africa. Some, but not all, consider no other university in South Africa reflects the rainbow nation like the University of Johannesburg.

The incorporation and merger was part of a series of major programmes that restructured higher education in South Africa; a result of the National Plan for Higher Education (2001). Consequently, this meant there was a reduction from 36 universities and technikons to 22 higher education institutions. South Africa now has 11 traditional universities, five universities of technology and six comprehensive institutions.

The University of Johannesburg distinguishes itself from its previous institutions as a new, adaptable and progressive institution. Early on, it was decided that UJ did not want a coat of arms and motto, as is customary with other tertiary educational institutions in South Africa. The administration decided rather to opt for a logo and brand identity. An internal competition was held where current students could put forward their proposals. In the interim, the previous motto of the Rand Afrikaans University "Diens Deur Kennis" (Afrikaans for Service Through Knowledge) was retained.

The logo was designed by Joey Hifi. The hoopoe (Upupa africana) is the official mascot of the UJ Sports Bureau.

== Campuses ==
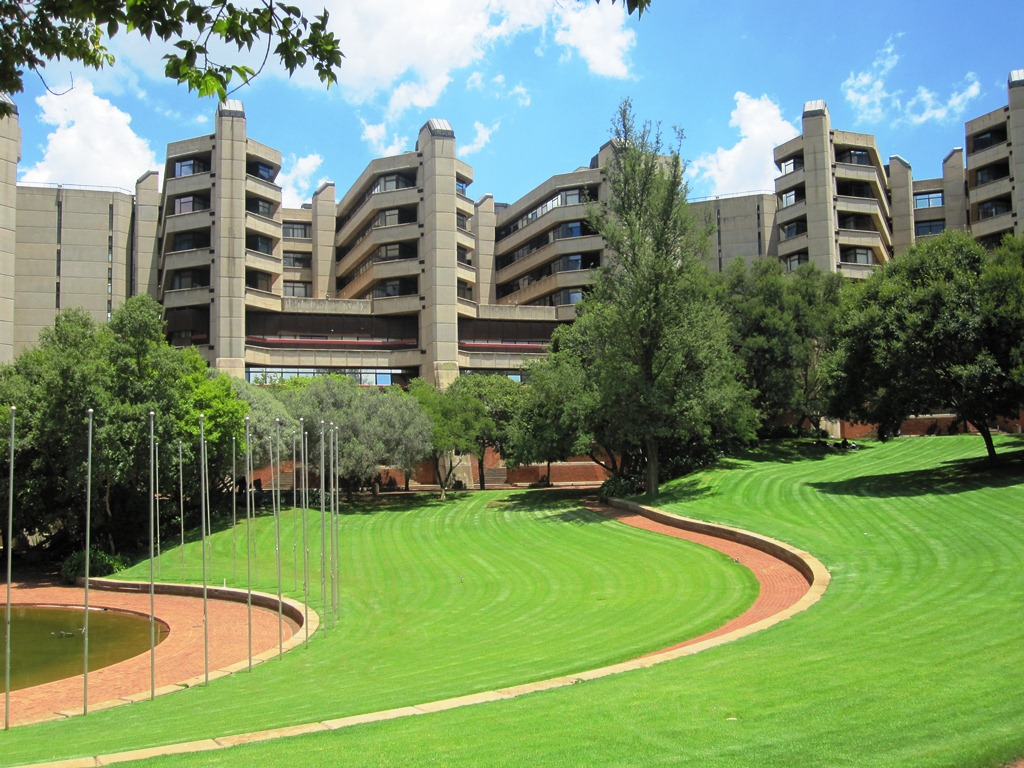
University of Johannesburg, Auckland Park Campus

UJ has four campuses: the Auckland Park Kingsway, Auckland Park Bunting Road, Doornfontein and Soweto campuses – all located in the metropolitan area of the City of Johannesburg.

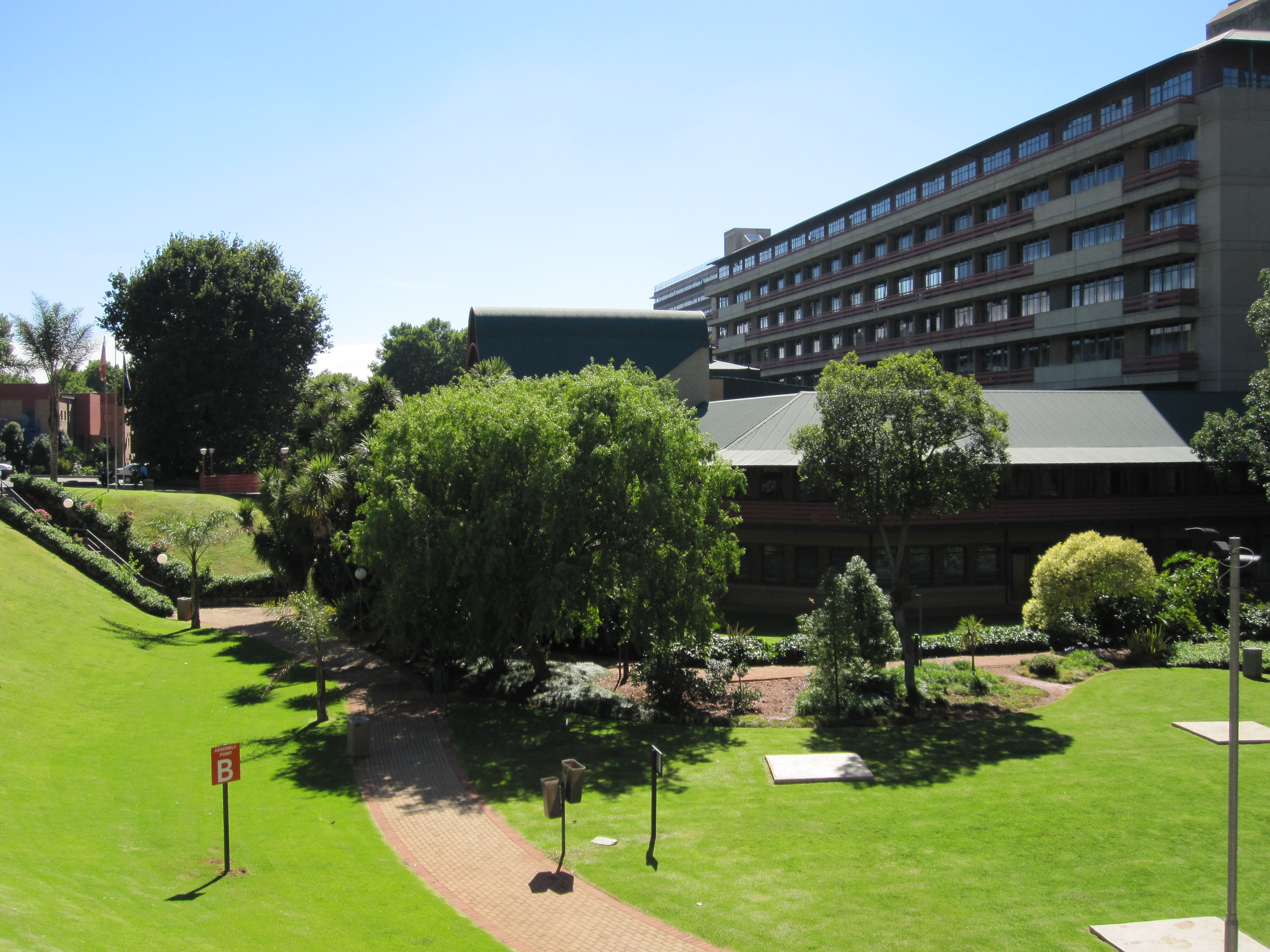
University of Johannesburg, Doornfontein Campus

The university comprises a built-up area over 45,000m^{2} and the facilities available at the respective campuses include:

- Lecture rooms
- Libraries
- Sports facilities
- Auditoriums, halls, galleries and conference venues
- Student shopping centres, restaurants and cafeterias
- Campus and health clinics.
- A villa for postgraduate students
- Court rooms

UJ owns an island in the Vaal River, formerly known as RAU Island.

=== Auckland Park, Kingsway ===
- The Kingsway Campus Auckland Park (APK), the former RAU campus

APK, is the largest and most populated campus of the University of Johannesburg. It is also the seat of the administration and governance body of the university. The campus was formerly the only educational campus of the Rand Afrikaans University. The campus gets its name from a major Johannesburg road, Kingsway Avenue, that runs along the north-east side of the campus. The roads that form the boundary of the campus are (clock-wise) University Road, Ditton Avenue, Ripley Road, Hampton Avenue, Studente Avenue, Akademie Road and Perth Road. Although the official name of the campus implies that it is in Auckland Park, it actually falls just out of that suburb by one street. It is technically in the suburb of Rossmore with the first-year parking lot bordering the suburb of Melville, Gauteng.

=== Auckland Park, Bunting Road ===
- The Bunting Road Campus Auckland Park (APB), the former TWR campus

The ABP was originally a campus of the Technikon Witwatersrand. Uniquely, the campus is an enclosed section of a suburb. The main thoroughfare of the suburb is Bunting Road. The name Bunting Road, according to the City of Johannesburg archives is derived from a subspecies of bird and not the decorative banner it is currently associated with. It houses the Faculty of Art, Design and Architecture.

=== Doornfontein ===
- The Doornfontein Campus (DFC), the former TWR campus. It houses the administrative offices of the Faculty of Health Sciences, as well as sub-faculties of Engineering and Built Environment as well as Science. The campus offers several health services to the public via its private, yet affordable clinics. These clinics are mostly staffed by students completing the clinic hours required for their qualification. The faculty has several practical and academic workspaces available for students including a large practical workshop for the Faculty of Engineering and the Built Environment; Rescue Simulation Center; Laser Research Facilities and Anatomical Dissection Hall for the Faculty of Health Sciences; and several laboratories serving for faculties of Health Science, Engineering and Built Environment, and Science.

=== Soweto ===
- The Soweto Campus (SWC), the former RAU campus and previously the Vista University Soweto campus

The East Rand Campus (ERC) was temporarily closed halfway through 2007 pending proposed redevelopment of the campus, provisionally planned for reopening in 2009.

== Organisation and administration ==
=== Executive Management Committee ===
The University of Johannesburg has the following executive management structure:

- Vice-Chancellor and Principal:

The Vice-Chancellor and Principal is the executive head of the university. All the offices listed below are subordinate to the Vice-Chancellor and Principal.

- Deputy Vice-Chancellor Academic:

Whose executive duties involve overseeing academic development and support, the dean of each faculty and effectively head of each school is subordinate to the Deputy Vice-Chancellor Academic.

- Chief Financial Officer (CFO):

Is the officer responsible for financial governance and revenue as well as expenditure and also effectively oversees the UJ pension fund.

- Deputy Vice-Chancellor Research and Internationalization:

Responsible for Internationalization, and overseeing Research and Innovation as well as the Library and Information Center.

- Registrar:

Responsible for central Academic administration (including alumni), corporate governance as well as student health and wellness.

- General Counsel:

General legal affairs pertaining the university, disputes and litigation as well as contracts.

- Chief Operating Officer (COO):

Responsible for the management of university facilities, safety and security as well as human capital management.

- Senior Executive Director:

University relations, sports, and general student affairs.

The University calls this the Executive Leadership Group (ELG).

== Academic profile ==
=== Rankings and reputation ===
University rankings

Global – Overall
- ARWU World: 501–600 (2023)
- QS World: =308 (2026)
- THE World: 401–500 (2024)

- The university is ranked within the top 2.3% of universities in the world in the QS World University Rankings 2022/2023.
- The university is ranked 63rd among all BRICS universities.
- International recognition for the University of Johannesburg has included a place among the top 200 universities in the THE Young University Rankings 2017.

UJ Times Higher Education Ranking 2017 to 2024
| Year | World Rank |
|---|---|
| 2024 | 401–500 |
| 2023 | 601–800 |
| 2022 | 601–800 |
| 2021 | 601–800 |
| 2020 | 601–800 |
| 2019 | 601–800 |
| 2018 | 601–800 |
| 2017 | 601–800 |

=== Research ===
Below is a list of all the research centres at the University of Johannesburg with information regarding their efforts, breakthroughs and other information where applicable.

- Centre for Visual Identities in Art and Design: The Centre for Visual Identities in Art and Design (CVIAD) is a crucial part of the University of Johannesburg's Faculty of Art, Design and Architecture. Established in 2007, CVIAD's main objectives include developing the faculty as a renowned hub for practice-based research via involvement with issues of image pertaining to text within art and design practices, and developing a body of knowledge in the fields of visual identities in art and design through the research of its Research Associates, Post-doctoral Fellows, and Staff Researchers as well as through Post-Graduate research efforts. The centre presents research in many formats, such as: exhibitions, installations, video screenings, live performances, curatorial practices, textual outputs by academics (including journals and periodicals), research projects undertaken by individuals and groups, workshops, seminars, conferences, discussions and presentations.
- Centre for Education Rights and Transformation: The Centre for Education Rights and Transformation (CERT) forms part of the Faculty of Education and was founded on 15 October 2009 at the Bunting Road Campus. One of the keynote speakers at the founding of CERT was Dr. Neville Alexander, a former prisoner who served time with Nelson Mandela at Robben Island. All the staff members that form part of the CERT have an avid interest in linking academic scholarship with societal changes and public involvement.
- Centre for Education Practice Research: The Centre for Education Practice Research (CEPR) forms a part of the Faculty of Education and was officially established on 24 April 2007 at the University of Johannesburg's Soweto Campus. CEPR's main objective is to foster research efforts which are dedicated to the generation of knowledge with regards to the practices and development of education in Southern African region.
- Advanced Composite Materials
- Industrial Electronics Technology Research Group
- Mineral Processing & Technology
- Photonics Research Group
- Stream Processing Research Group
- Telecommunications Research Group: The Telecommunications Research Group forms part of the Faculty of Engineering and the Build Environment.
- Laser Research Centre
- Research Centre on Civil Engineering Materials: The Research Centre on Civil Engineering Materials is presently being founded in the ABA Brink Materials Laboratory and will form part of the operations of the Faculty of Engineering and the Build Environment.
- Water & Health Research Centre: The Water and Health Research Centre consists of a Water Research Group based in the Department of Civil Engineering Science, which forms part of the Faculty of Engineering and the Build Environment, and various other water-related groups in the university, like the Water and Health Research Unit. The Water and Health Group involves various researchers working on water research from several faculties at the University of Johannesburg and from other universities as well.
- Centre for Culture and Languages in Africa
- Centre of Social Development in Africa
- Centre for Sociological Research
- South African Institute for Advanced Constitutional, Public & Human Rights
- The Institute of Transport and Logistics Studies in Africa
- Centre for Aquatic Research
- African Centre for DNA Barcoding: The African Centre for DNA Barcoding (ACDB) is a subsidiary of the University of Johannesburg and an academic unit contained within the departments of Botany & Plant Biotechnology and Zoology, and jurisdiction of the Faculty of Science. The mission of ACDB is to facilitate the gap of knowledge and to enhance the research frameworks for global, regional and inter-institutional co-operation in Africa in relation to key fields of DNA technology, such as biodiversity and DNA barcoding. As of July 2013, ACDB has catalogued barcodes for 15 584 plant specimens across 8 352 species and 14 253 animal specimens across 1 493 species, resulting in 29 837 specimens across 9 845 species overall. The International Barcode of Life project received a financial grant of $2.2 million from Canada's International Development Research Centre so that researchers from Argentina, Costa Rica, Kenya, Peru and South Africa could play key roles in the project, of which ACDB forms an important part. The Japanese car manufacturer Toyota also sponsors ACDB in the form of a fleet of vehicles which researchers utilize to access rough terrains. They work together with the research team in a project called the Toyota Enviro Outreach.
- Centre for Nanomaterials Sciences Research: The Centre for Nanomaterials Sciences Research (CNSR) was established in 2007 and was founded on four key aspects: nanomaterials for water treatment, nanomaterials for catalysis applications, bio-nanomaterials, and nanomaterials for sensors and photovoltaic applications. The CNSR supports and facilitates the individual and cooperative research efforts and is a part of the Department of Applied Chemistry, which is a department which falls under the Faculty of Science. The centre has worked with the South African Chemical Institute, the Water Institute of Southern Africa, the South African Nanotechnology Initiative, the American Chemical Society and the Royal Society of Chemistry in the past.
- Paleoproterozoic Mineralisation Research Group: The Paleoproterozoic Mineralisation Research Group (PPM) falls under the jurisdiction of the Department of Geology, which falls under the Faculty of Science. The PPM's main objectives include studying and modelling the relationship between environmental change and styles of mineralization in the Precambrian Era, particularly on the Paleoproterozoic Era, studying the temporal and spatial distribution, composition, and origin of mineral deposits on local and regional scales, and training postgraduate students in the field of Economic Geology. The PPM is financed by grants provided by the National Research Foundation of South Africa and the Faculty of Science.
- Sustainable Energy Technology and Research Centre
- Centre for Catalysis Research
- Centre for Banking Law
- Centre for International Law
- Centre for Africa-China Studies

== Faculties ==
=== Art, Design and Architecture ===
The Faculty of Art, Design and Architecture (FADA) offers programmes in eight creative disciplines.

FADA is home to the following departments:

- Department of Industrial Design
- Department of Architecture
- Department of Fashion Design
- Department of Graphic Design
- Department of Interior Design
- Department of Jewellery Design and Manufacture
- Department of Multimedia
- Department of Visual Art

=== College of Business and Economics ===
The University of Johannesburg's College of Business and Economics (CBE) was launched in July 2017. The college emerged from the former Faculty of Management and the former economics and finance faculty.

The faculty includes different schools namely:

- School of Accountancy
  - Department of Accountancy
  - Department of Commercial Accounting
- School of Consumer Intelligence and Information Systems
  - Department of Applied Information Systems
  - Department of Information and Knowledge Management
  - Department of Marketing Management
- School of Economics
  - Department of Economics and Econometrics
  - Public and Environmental Economics Research Centre
- School of Management
  - Department of Business Management
  - Department of Finance and Investment Management
  - Department of Industrial Psychology and People Management
  - Department of Transport and Supply Chain Management
- School of Public Management, Governance and Public Policy
  - Department of Public Management and Governance
- School of Tourism and Hospitality
  - Hospitality Management
  - Tourism Management
  - Food and Beverage Operations

=== Engineering and the Built Environment ===
- Department of Aircraft Maintenance and Engineering
- Department of Chemical Engineering
- Department of Civil Engineering Science
- Department of Civil Engineering Technology
- Department of Construction Management and Quantity Surveying
- Department of Electrical and Electronic Engineering Science
- Department of Electrical and Electronic Engineering Technology
- Department of Metallurgy
- Department of Mechanical & Industrial Engineering Technology
- Department of Mechanical Engineering Science
- Department of Mine Surveying
- Department of Mining Engineering
- Department of Quality and Operations Management
- Department of Town and Regional Planning.

=== Health Sciences ===
The faculty has a large department for sport studies, which includes sport psychology, sport management, sport communication, sport development and sport science. It houses the following departments (some of which serve as the best in the country):

- Department of Biomedical Technology
- Department of Chiropractic
- Department of Emergency Medical Care
- Department of Environmental Health
- Department of Homeopathy
- Department of Human Anatomy and Physiology
- Department of Medical Imaging and Radiation (Radiography)
- Department of Nursing
- Department of Optometry
- Department of Podiatry
- Department of Somatology
- Department of Sport and Movement Studies

=== Science ===
The faculty currently has 11 departments: Academy of Computer Science and Software Engineering; Biochemistry; Biotechnology and Food Technology; Botany and Plant Biotechnology; Chemical Sciences; Geography, Environmental Management & Energy Studies; Geology; Physics; Pure and Applied Mathematics; Statistics; and Zoology.

== Traditions and student activities ==
The University of Johannesburg has a students' representative council (SRC) referred to as the UJSRC, as well as an SRC for each of the four campuses. The UJSRC consists of eight members, two members per campus, and they are elected by the student bodies of each campus. The UJSRC represents all UJ students, addressing issues and concerns which are of relevance to the whole student body. Each individual campus has its own Campus SRC which is elected from members of that particular campus' student body. The powers and functions of Campus SRCs are delegated to them by the UJSRC and Campus SRCs consist of ten members.

=== Media and societies ===
The University of Johannesburg has a radio station that airs on its campuses called UJFM which aims to reflect the demographics of the university by airing content that is relevant to the target market. In April 2010, UJFM moved to the Bunting Road Campus where it has access to more professional, state of the art equipment. UJFM operates on a frequency of 95.4FM.

The university also has its own student newspaper, the UJ Observer. The purpose of the paper is to act as a communication medium for the student community with the goal of providing information to the student community, investigating issues of importance to the student community, and reflecting debates about current affairs on the various campuses of the university. The UJ Observer also offers journalism students a practical platform to learn and develop journalistic and managerial skill sets. However, students do not necessarily have to be journalism students to be a members of the UJ Observer's editorial team. The paper operates on all of the campuses of the University of Johannesburg.

Students interested in taking part in charity events can do so via UJ's RAG (Remember and Give) committees, which are voluntary student organizations that raise funds and take part in community relief efforts. It is a tradition at UJ to host a RAG Week during the opening week of the academic year, in which events like musical performances, beauty competitions, fun days and float processions take place to generate funds. However, RAG committees operate throughout the academic year in various activities.

Registered students have the option to take part in societies at UJ which are divided into four broad kinds of society: academic societies, political societies, religious societies and social societies.

=== Athletics, sport, arts and culture ===
The university offers many different kinds of sport:

- Athletics
- Basketball
- Canoeing
- Climbing
- Cricket
- Cycling
- Golf
- Gymnastics
- Hockey
- Judo
- Karate
- Netball
- Rowing
- Rugby union
- Soccer
- Softball
- Squash
- Swimming
- Tennis
- Triathlon
- Volleyball
- Water polo

As with the former RAU, rugby is a large focus of many students. UJ's competitive sport is regulated by the UJ Sports Bureau. Sport education is regulated by the Faculty of Health Science and Department of Sport and Movement Studies.

UJ has made a name for itself in athletics, hockey, basketball and rowing particularly. 2008 Olympic representative Juan Van Deventer was at the time a student. Several players who competed for the South Africa national basketball team at the 2011 African Basketball Championship in Madagascar were UJ Alumni.

UJ has numerous sporting venues:

- UJ Gymnasium – located on APK campus; used for various sports
- UJ Hockey Stadium and Grounds – located in Melville; used for hockey
- UJ Stadium – located in Westdene; used primarily for athletics but also soccer
- Grasdak – located in Westdene; used primarily for rowing
- Soweto Stadium – located in Soweto; used primarily for soccer
- Kingsway Campus Auckland Park – contains squash courts, a swimming pool and volleyball courts

The University of Johannesburg has an arts centre, comprising a 436-seat theatre, an art gallery and rehearsal studios where the UJ Arts Academy rehearses. This academy consists of the University of Johannesburg Choir (conducted by Sizwe Mondlane), the UJ Drama Company, the UJ Dance Company and the UJ Song and Dance Company.

== People ==
=== Students ===
In 2024, the University of Johannesburg had a total student population of 54,525 students, of which 41,229 were undergraduates (~75%) and 13,296 were postgraduates (~24%) students.

The Student Accommodation & Residence Life division is mainly responsible for the accommodation of approximately 19,000 students in both university-owned and managed residences as well as off-campus accredited privately owned accommodation.

There are 35 residences, including the seven day houses.

Off-campus accommodation accredited properties are mostly within 2 km of each campus, and in the case they are beyond the prescribed radius, the set condition is that service providers are obliged to provide transport. Additionally, inter-campus transportation is provided for all students residing in off-campus residences and day houses. The division offers all students a list of accredited off-campus accommodation.

=== Faculty and staff ===
Student demographics at the University of Johannesburg in 2024
| Population Group | Headcount | Percentage |
|---|---|---|
| African | 45,608 | 84% |
| Coloured | 1,079 | 2% |
| Indian | 1,561 | 3% |
| International | 4,251 | 8% |
| White | 2,026 | 4% |
| Total | 54,525 | 100% |

=== International students ===
International Students at the University of Johannesburg by Region in 2024
| Region | Headcount | Percentage |
|---|---|---|
| Americas | 17 | ~0% |
| Asia | 115 | 3% |
| Australasia | 2 | ~0% |
| Europe | 41 | 1% |
| Other African countries | 743 | 17% |
| SADC countries | 3,218 | 76% |
| No information | 115 | 3% |
| Total | 4,251 | 100% |

==== Headcount (HC) ====
In 2024, the university employed 1,384 permanent instructional and research professional staff and a total of 4,675 staff, which includes support, management, administrative, and executive staff members.

==== Full-Time Equivalent (FTE) ====
In 2018, the full-time equivalent staff count stood at 1,170.

== Popular culture ==
- On 29 June 2013, Barack Obama visited the university's Soweto campus. He received an honorary doctorate from the University of Johannesburg.

Controversy

In 2011, the university decided to suspend ties with Israeli Ben-Gurion University, citing the university's support for the Israeli military. The decision was seen to affect projects in biotechnology and water purification.

However, two days later, Ihron Rensburg, vice-chancellor and principal of the university issued a statement saying that "UJ is not part of an academic boycott of Israel...It has never been UJ's intention to sever all ties with BGU, although it may have been the intention of some UJ staff members."

== See also ==
- Cape Peninsula University of Technology
- University of Cape Town
- Central University of Technology, Free State
- Stellenbosh University
- Nelson Mandela University
- University of KwaZulu-Natal
