= Letlhokwa George Mpedi =

University of Johannesburg Vice-Chancellor

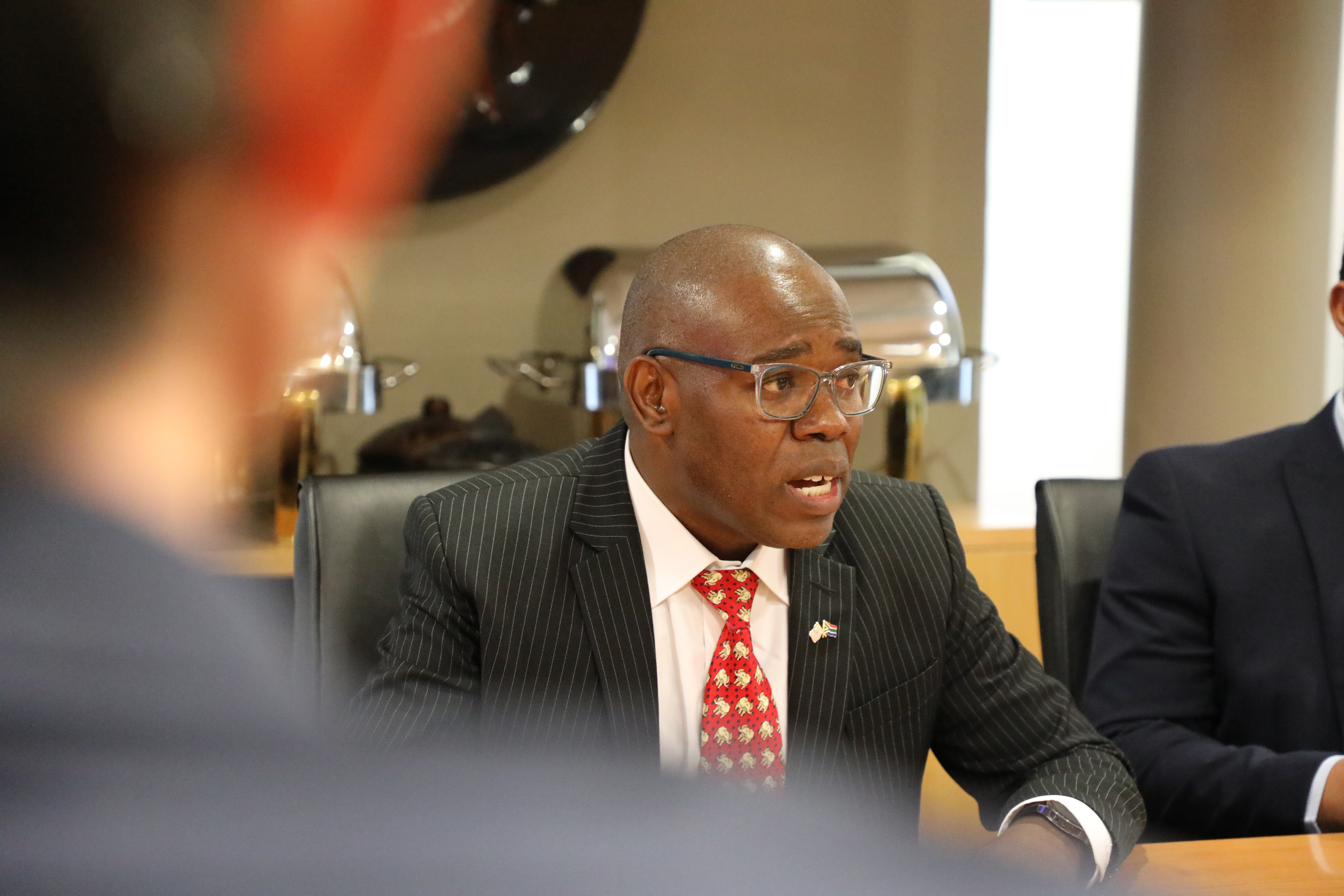
- Mpedi in September 2023

Vice-chancellor of University of Johannesburg
- Incumbent
- Assumed office 1 March 2023
- Preceded by: Tshilidzi Marwala

Personal details
- Spouse: Bessy Mpedi (née Kgobe)
- Children: 1
- Parent(s): Daniel Pule Mpedi and Josephine Hambile Mpedi
- Education: Vista University; University of Johannesburg
- Profession: Professor
- Awards: Deutscher Akademischer Austauschdienst (DAAD) award

Letlhokwa George Mpedi is a South African academic, who is Vice-Chancellor and Principal of the University of Johannesburg, as of March 2023, succeeding Professor Tshilidzi Marwala.

== Early years and education ==
Letlhokwa George Mpedi was born and brought up in a small village in Hammanskraal, a region in northern Gauteng province, South Africa.

Attending Vista University, Mpedi completed his BJuris degree (1996) and LLB degree (1998), and he went on to earn his Doctor of Laws qualification from Rand Afrikaans University (now University of Johannesburg). He twice received the Deutscher Akademischer Austauschdienst (DAAD) award (in 2000 and 2001), to conduct research in Germany, and in 2003 he took a post-doctoral fellowship at the Max Planck Society in Munich.

He served as the Deputy Vice-Chancellor and Dean of Law at the University of Johannesburg, where he was the first black law dean and one of only a few in South Africa. He sits on the board of governors of the International Association of Law Schools.

His official inauguration as Vice-Chancellor and Principal of the University of Johannesburg took place on 10 March 2023.

Mpedi contributes regularly to South African newspapers, including the Daily Maverick, as well as having written many peer-reviewed articles and book chapters. He is also the author of the 2023 book From the Baobab to the Mosquito: Rethinking Leadership Through African Sayings.

== Awards and recognition ==
Awards that Mpedi has received include in 2023 an honorary doctorate from Caucasus University in Tbilisi, Georgia.

== Personal life ==
Mpedi is married to Bessy (née Kgobe) and they have a son.

== Works ==
=== Books ===
- From the Baobab to the Mosquito: Rethinking Leadership Through African Sayings, Tracey McDonald Publishers, 2023, ISBN 978-1-7764431-2-3.
- (With Tshilidzi Marwala) Artificial intelligence and the law, Palgrave Macmillan, 2024.

=== Selected shorter writings ===
- N Smit, LG Mpedi. "Social protection for developing countries: Can social insurance be more relevant for those working in the informal economy?" Law, Democracy & Development 14 (1), 1–33, 29 2010.
- MP Olivier, LG Mpedi. "Extending social protection to families in the African context: the complementary role of formal and informal social security in Social security in a long life society". 4th International Research Conference on Social Security, Antwerp, 5–7 14 2003.
- M Nyenti, LG Mpedi. "The impact of SADC social protection instruments on the setting up of a minimum social protection floor in southern African countries". Potchefstroom Electronic Law Journal 15 (1), 244–281, 13, 2012.
- LG Mpedi. "The evolving relationship between labour law and social security". Acta Juridica, 2012 (1), 270–285.

=== As editor ===
- (With Tineke Dijkhoff) Recommendation on Social Protection Floors: Basic Principles for Innovative Solutions, 2016.
- Santa Claus: Law, Fourth Industrial Revolution, Decolonisation and Covid-19, African Sun Media, 2020, ISBN 9781928314820.
- (With Mehmet Okyayuz, Junxiang Mao, Peter Herrmann) Human Rights in a Changing World: Reflections on Fundamental Challenges, Springer, 2023.
- Women: Wise, Optimistic, Motivating, Empowering & Nurturing, UJ Press, 2024.
