= King Fahd Academy (Germany) =

- أكاديمية الملك فهد; König-Fahd-Akademie
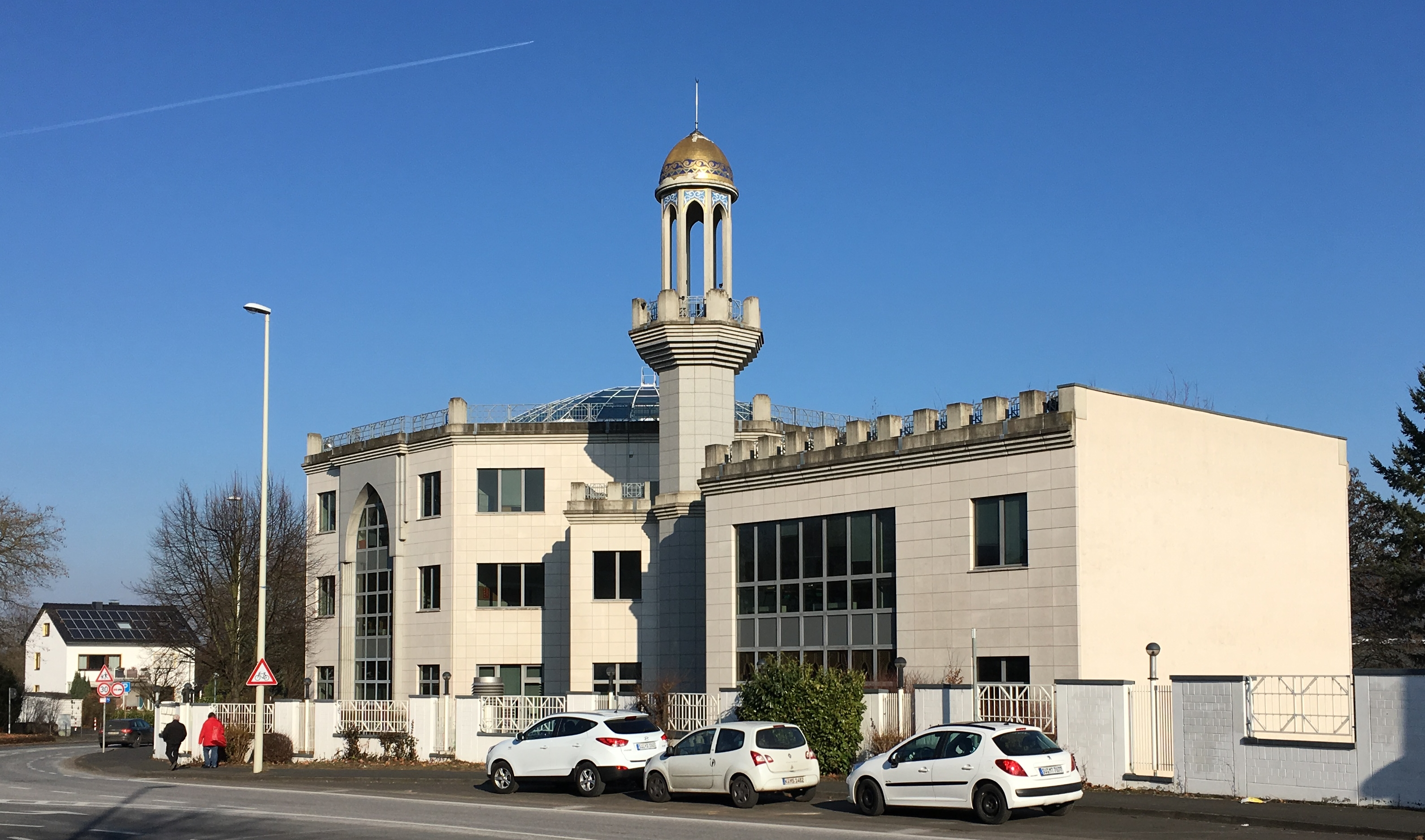

Location
- Mallwitzstraße 2, 53177 Bonn, Germany; Bonn; Germany; 50°40′00″N 7°10′29″E

Information
- Type: Saudi Arabian international school
- Closed: 2017
- Website: kfa-bonn.com

King Fahd Academy (German: König-Fahd-Akademie, Arabic: أكاديمية الملك فهد بألمانيا. بون) was a school in Lannesdorf, Bad Godesberg district, Bonn, Germany. The school, with an attached mosque, housing elementary school through high school, opened in 1995. Financed by the King of Saudi Arabia and sponsored by Saudi Arabia, it was named after King Fahd. The school was closed at the end of the 2016/2017 school year, after long-running criticism that it was attracting Islamists to Germany. The school's last director was Ibrahim Al-Megren.

== History ==
=== Founding and change of mission ===
It was established in 1994 and officially opened in 1995. With its construction financed by the government of Saudi Arabia, it was originally designed to provide an Islamic education to diplomats and other children residing in Germany for a short period of time. Originally the mosque attached to the school was open to the public. There were plans to include an Arabic language school with a capacity of 500 students. The initial cost of construction was almost 76 million Saudi riyals, equivalent to almost €15 million or $20 million, all donated by King Fahd. The Saudi Arabian government had previously supported a school called the "New Arabic School", but withdrew funds to instead have King Fahd, which was to have more Arabic and Saudi-centred instruction, built. New Arabic School closed shortly afterward.

At the time the school opened, the Saudi Embassy to Germany asked German officials to allow students of any nationality to attend King Fahd, but the German officials stated that all students except for children of diplomatic personnel were required to attend schools with curricula approved by German authorities. By the late 1990s embassies moved from Bonn, the former capital of West Germany, to Berlin, the capital of reunified Germany. Many Muslim immigrant families moved to Bad Godesberg, where the embassies and their staff were formerly located. Many parents permanently residing in Germany who wanted to give their children an Islamic education also began patronizing the school, and some moved to Bonn specifically so their children could attend this school. Der Spiegel stated that the school caused many Islamists to settle in Bonn. German authorities did not realize that the school was gaining a local Muslim student body as no central office processed the requests from parents to have their children attend King Fahd Academy instead of local German schools; the principals of the schools granted exceptions that allowed the children to attend King Fahd Academy.

=== 2000s controversy and attempted closure ===
In 2003 the television documentary programme Panorama aired a special about the school. This documentary caused the school to suspend Anas Bayram, the imam, who had asked students to be trained in physical activities; the documentary stated that he was preparing students for jihad. William Boston of TIME wrote that there were "some distortions" within the documentary, including when it attributed a pro-September 11 essay written by a non-student to the school.

Meanwhile officials from the local government obtained copies of the textbooks and class schedules and found that it had insufficient class hours devoted to academic subjects, an excessive amount of class hours devoted to religion, and textbook material that was for Islamist beliefs and against non-Muslims. In 2003 North Rhine Westphalia regional commissioner Jürgen Roters stated that he wished to close the school, accusing it of having connections to Islamist groups, including Mamduh Salim. German politicians were sensitive to Islamism since it was revealed that some September 11 attacks hijackers had spent time in Germany. Area politician Jamal Karsli and parents at the school opposed the planned closure. Some parents accused the area politicians of trying to stop the influx of Muslims into Bonn. Otto Schily, the Minister of the Interior, criticized the anti-King Fahd media and stated that the German government would continue to support the school. A high-ranking official in the German federal government told The Wall Street Journal that German officials did not want to lose cooperation with the Saudis and were afraid that if they closed this school, the Saudis would retaliate and close the German International School Riyadh.

According to Melissa Eddy of The New York Times a "compromise" between German officials and the school kept it open. It meant that the mosque would be reserved for those who are connected with the school, and that German citizens would be barred from attending the school. All exemptions granted to allow German citizens to attend the school were revoked. Several hundred students had to leave King Fahd Academy, so some area domestic elementary schools began offering Arabic classes to help integrate the students. Saudi officials initially stated that King Fahd would move to Berlin, with the old building becoming a cultural centre. The Bonn school stayed open.

=== Planned closure ===
In 2012 protests and riots involving Islamists and Germans occurred outside of the school.

As of 2009 the Saudi government was negotiating with the parliament of Berlin to have a new 400 student school established in Berlin. Plans were approved on the condition that the school was small in size and had no mosque. The Saudi government planned to establish a residential district around the new school.

The school was closed in 2017, after long-running criticism that it was attracting Islamists to Germany. Deutsche Welle reported that the plans for a Berlin campus had been stopped.

== Campus ==
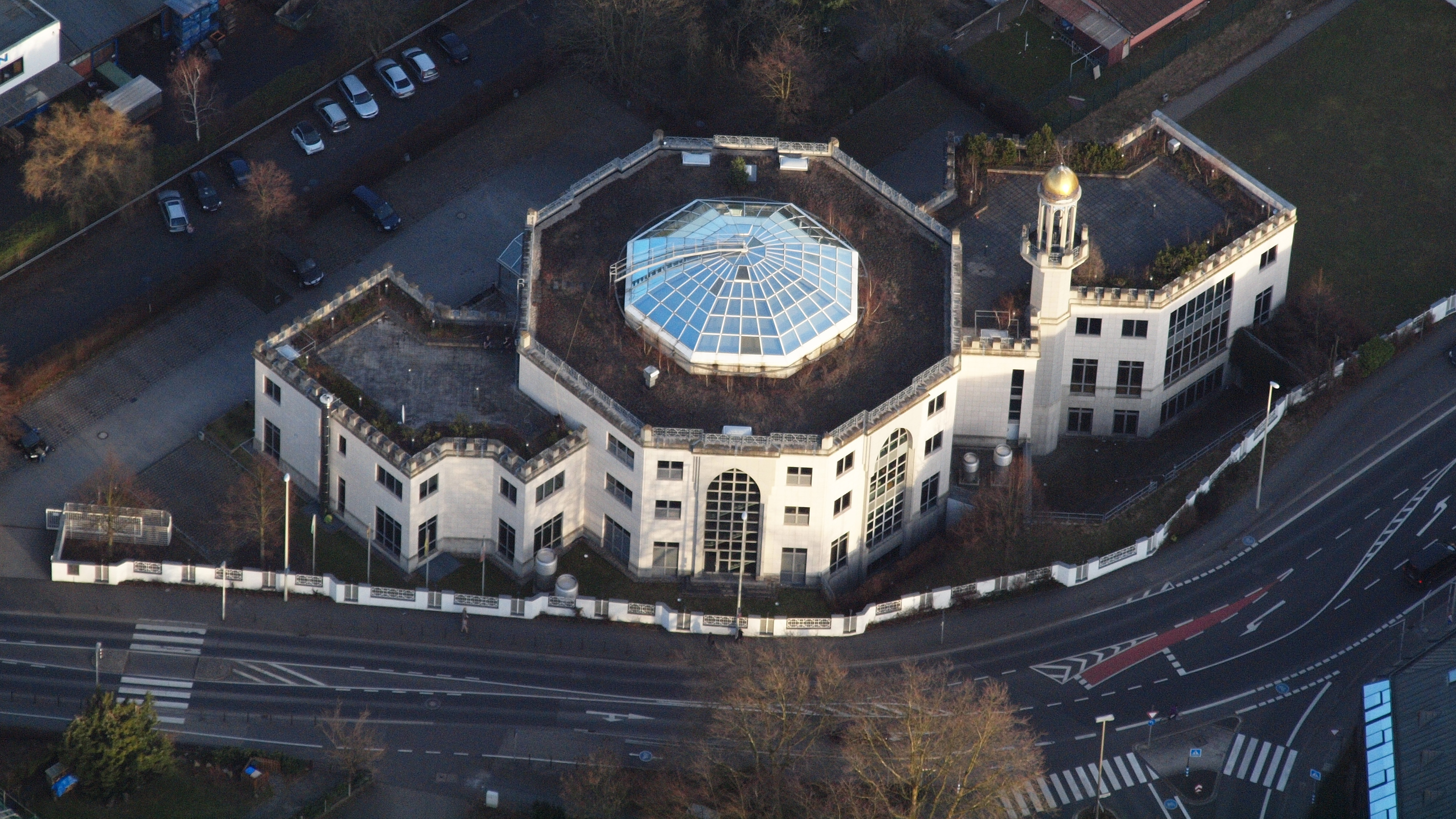
Aerial view of the school building, with a minaret adjacent to the school building

The school used a white marble building topped by a minaret.

== Curriculum ==
The school had curricula derived from that in Saudi Arabia, and it followed the practices of Wahhabi Islam. As of 2003 its primary language of instruction is Arabic. It became an International Baccalaureate school on 1 August 2014, and it offered English-medium IB classes, taught in grades 11 and 12.

As of 2003 the school had eight hours of Islamic education, six hours of Arabic, and one hour of German classes per week for its students. As of 2004 it had 12 hours of Islamic education, nine hours of Arabic, and three hours of Saudi history per week. In 2003 Deutsche Welle stated that statistics stated that most graduates of King Fahd were going to reside in Germany after finishing their education but that "the school does little to integrate the children into their German surroundings".

== Student body ==
As of 2003 the school had 195 students with German citizenship and about 405 students without German citizenship. Late in 2003 the student body was about 465, and by 2004 the student body had declined to 300, partly due to the loss of the German citizens. In 2008 the student body was 166. In 2016 it had about 150 students and 30 teachers.

== See also ==
- German International School Jeddah
- List of things named after Saudi kings
- Islam in Germany
