= Deutsche Internationale Schule Johannesburg =

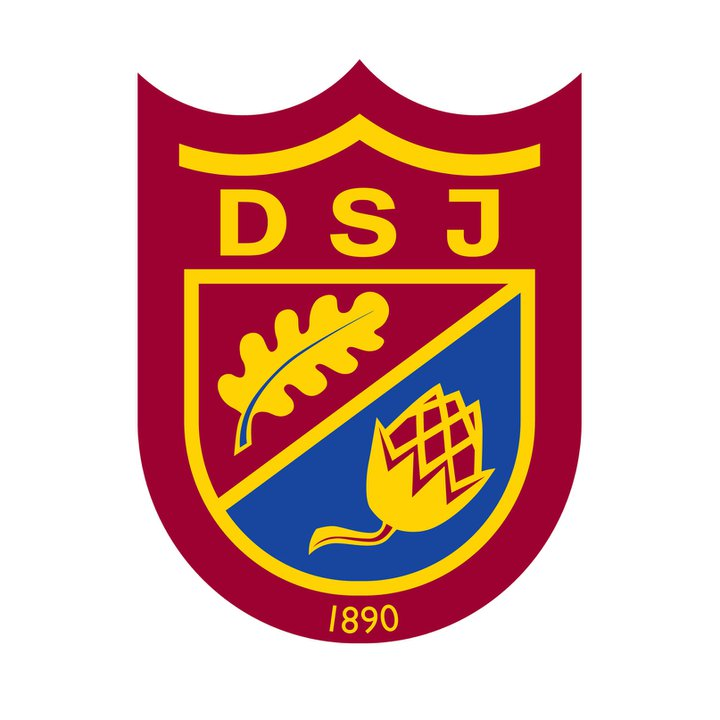

Location
- 11 Sans Souci Road, Parktown P.O. Box 91005 Auckland Park 2006; Parktown, Johannesburg, South Africa
- Coordinates: 26°10′43.25″S 28°1′8.99″E

Information
- Type: Private school
- Established: 1890
- Founder: Pastor Hermann Kuschke
- Headmaster: Priska Döring
- Staff: approx. 130 full-time
- Enrollment: 1,050
- Coat of arms: Oak Tree Leaf, Protea
- Website: dsj.co.za

The Deutsche Internationale Schule Johannesburg (DSJ) is a German international school in Auckland Park, Johannesburg.

Founded in 1890, the DSJ is one of the oldest schools in the city and one of the largest German schools on the African continent. At present approximately 1050 learners of 27 different nationalities are taught at the DSJ.

The Deutsche Internationale Schule Johannesburg is an integrated school with a bilingual educational programme: it offers both Matric, the South African exit exam, and the German Abitur.

== Purpose ==
The offerings of the DSJ strongly convey German tradition, language and culture, which is the focus for all streams of the school. The DSJ is also a school where learners from numerous nationalities and cultural backgrounds are educated. After an overwhelming vote by parents, the decision was taken to rename the school the ‘Deutsche Internationale Schule Johannesburg’ in March 2003. This legacy continues with 35 nationalities represented amongst its 1100, most being in the kindergarten, learners in 2015.

== History ==
=== Founding ===
Founded in 1886, Johannesburg emerged after the discovery of gold, which saw many people flock to the area, including a large German community. This community wanted a school where their children would be taught in German. Plans started to take shape in 1888 but this ambitious undertaking failed in the following year due to a severe economic crisis.

Despite this, Pastor Hermann Kuschke did not give up and started to give lessons at his home at the beginning of 1890 and later at the church of the Berlin Mission Community to a single learner, Ernst Ritter, the son of church board member J. Ritter. Only one year later, the number grew to 20 learners. They were taught Religion, German, English, Dutch, Arithmetic, Biology, History, Geography, Singing, Drawing and Gymnastics.

Gold continued to attract more people to Johannesburg and the German population rose to approximately 4000. They collected and donated enough money so that in 1897 a new school could be built in Hillbrow. The property was a present from Paul Kruger, former President of the South African Republic. Mathilde Rolfes laid the foundation stone for the Deutsche Schule Johannesburg on 4 April 1897.

=== First World War ===
The DSJ was highly regarded in Johannesburg at the beginning of the 20th century. However, the outbreak of World War I brought an end to this positive development. Europe was embroiled in a bloody war, which also impacted on people of European heritage in Johannesburg. In 1915, DSJ learners burnt British and Italian flags in the school courtyard which forced the school to be closed.

Teachers who were not interned were moved and distributed amongst other schools. The property and the building were leased to the government. An English school, the Hospital Hill School, occupied the facility. Germans were no longer welcome in Johannesburg at that time. Many disappeared or made sure they could not be recognised as being German.

=== Inter-war ===
In 1920, the School Board saw that the time had come to breathe new life into the Deutsche Schule Johannesburg project and Saturday classes started in the sacristy of the Friedenskirche. Regular lessons in the classrooms of the school were again possible as from 1922 with only 10 learners and 3 teachers. The popular sporting and music opportunities heightened the appeal of the Deutsche Schule Johannesburg. The number of learners and teachers increased considerably in the following years.

=== Second World War ===
The outbreak of World War II in 1939 brought renewed challenges. Due to the strict policy of political neutrality to which the DSJ committed itself, the authorities allowed the school to remain open, this despite the anti-German sentiment in the country. This was owed to the goodwill of the Afrikaners of the Transvaal Education Department (TED) towards the Germans at the time. In 1942, DSJ learners wrote matric exams for the first time since 1914.

=== Latter 20th century ===
A wave of immigration after World War II brought many Germans to South Africa. Increased numbers put the school into educational and organisational difficulties. The facility in Hillbrow was too small and this meant that land in Parktown was purchased in 1959 but due to budget constraints, construction only commenced in 1967. The cost of the new school building was an estimated R1 million and was paid for by the Federal Republic of Germany as well as a fund established by the parents. After two years of construction, the new state-of-the-art school at Sans Souci was completed and the big move from Edith Cavell Street in Hillbrow to Sans Souci in Parktown took place on 20 January 1969.

Parallel to the DSJ's spatial extensions was the expansion of the pedagogic offerings. In 1979, the first pre-school learners enrolled. A year later the first steps were taken towards integration and at the end of 1983 the first Abitur exams were written.

In a bid to take a stand against Apartheid, the German Government insisted on the enrolment of non-white learners at the DSJ. In 1989 the New Secondary School stream was launched (originally known as ‘F-Zweig and today NSek), which allowed learners from previously disadvantaged backgrounds the opportunity of a private school education without the financial burdens. The first NSek learners completed their matric in 1996 and their Abitur in 1997.

=== 21st century ===
After 26 years, the Abitur was reduced from 13 years to 12 years for German schools in Southern Africa. From 2009 onwards, graduates would finish with a combined National Senior Certificate (NSC) and the German International Abitur (DIA).

After a week of intense scrutiny, the DSJ was awarded the status of ‘Exzellente Deutsche Auslandsschule’ in 2011, a seal of quality introduced by the German Federal Office of Administration which serves as the quality assurance and stands for quality development for German schools abroad.

In 2012, the opening of a Regentröpchen occurred (meaning that the DSJ caters for all learners from age 1 to Matric) along with the first Grade 8 class of the English Medium High School. In 2016 the learners of this first class completed their school careers at the DSJ.

2015 marked a historic moment for the Deutsche Internationale Schule Johannesburg. The oldest co-educational school in Johannesburg celebrated its 125 year anniversary which was highlighted by a Festival Week in September 2015.

In 2016 the DSJ was voted best International German school outside of Germany in Der Deutsche Schulpreis award.
