= Melville Koppies =

Nature Reserve in Gauteng, South Africa

Melville Koppies Nature Reserve
- Interactive map of Melville Koppies Nature Reserve
- Location: South Africa
- Nearest city: Johannesburg
- Coordinates: 26.1674986°S 28.0020311°E
- Area: 42.93 ha (106.1 acres)
- Established: 2 September 1959
- Hiking trails: 3
- Website: Melville Koppies Nature Reserve

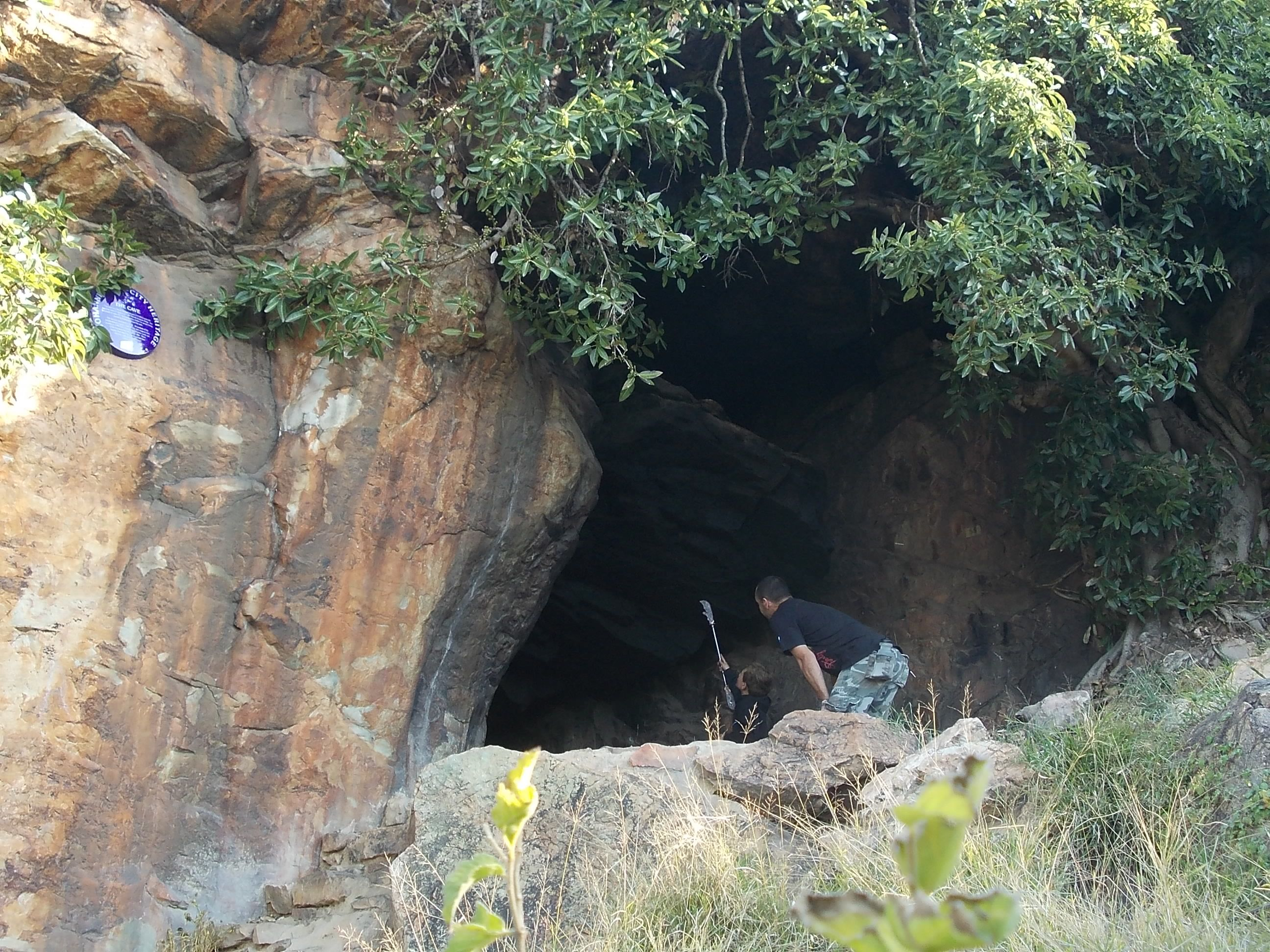
The Melville Koppies Cave. The plaque indicates that it is a Johannesburg Heritage site. The plaque states: "The cave is a fissure formed between 2.9 billion-year-old quartzite rocks of what is now the Melville Koppies Ridge. For hundreds of years the cave provided a shelter for people living around and moving across the area. The site was excavated in 1971. An analysis of the archaeological remains found in the cave suggests that, as early as 1500 A.D., farming communities made use of the resources the area had to offer. When supplies dwindled they supplemented their diet with wild plants and hunted wild animals."

Melville Koppies is a nature reserve and a Johannesburg City Heritage Site in Johannesburg, South Africa. The word 'koppie' means small hill.

Iron Age artifacts can still be found at the site. Visitors can walk or hike in the Koppies, and tours are offered. Neighbouring it is the Johannesburg Botanical Garden.

== History ==
In 1963 Revil Mason, excavating at the Koppies, found an Iron Age furnace for smelting iron ore, either in a bowl or sunken furnace with carbon dating of charcoal found at varies levels at the site shows it would have been in use at various times between 1060AD and 1580AD. Another more modern Iron Age furnace was found on the northern slopes dating to the 18th/19th centuries.

== See also ==
- Melville, Johannesburg
