= German International School Jeddah =

- Deutsche Internationale Schule Jeddah المدرسة الدولية الألمانية في جدة
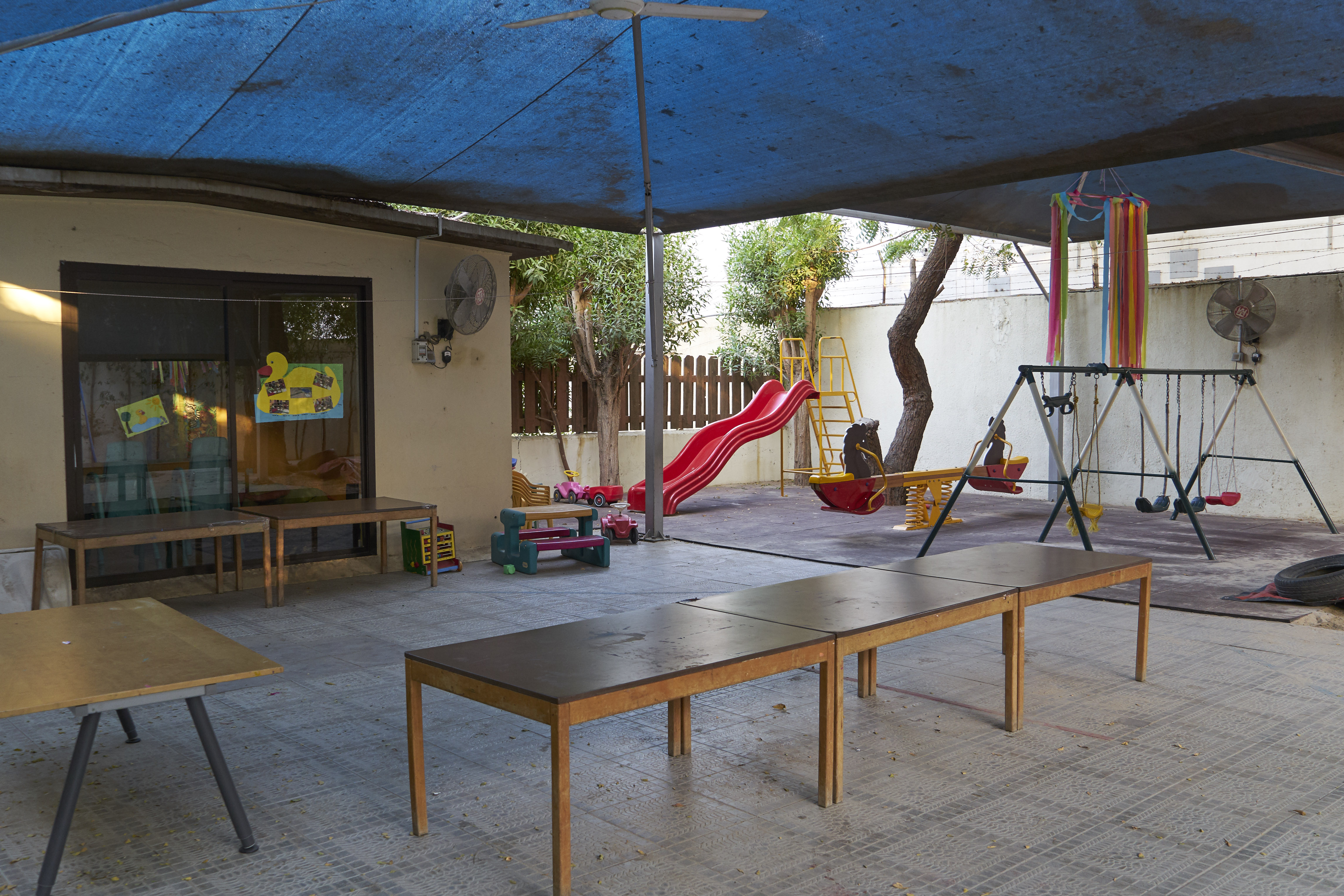
- The school's kindergarten courtyard and playground

Location
- Jeddah 21472 Kingdom of Saudi-Arabia; Jeddah; Saudi Arabia
- Coordinates: 21.59649340211068°N 39.19186126080837°E

Information
- Type: German international school
- Established: 1975
- Principal: Volkmar Guenl-Baxmeier
- Grades: Preschool and kindergarten through 12th grade
- Enrollment: 104 students + 51 in preschool and kindergarten
- Website: disj.de

German International School Jeddah (GISJ; German: Deutsche Internationale Schule Jeddah, DISJ; Arabic: المدرسة الدولية الألمانية في جدة) is a German international school in Jeddah, Saudi Arabia.

The school was established in 1975, and serves preschool through grade 12.

In 2012, GISJ received an award for the best German school abroad by the government of Germany; the award was given by German president Joachim Gauck.

== See also ==
- King Fahd Academy, a Saudi Arabian international school in Cologne, Germany
- Education in Saudi Arabia
- List of schools in Saudi Arabia
