= UJFM =

Radio station in Johannesburg, South Africa

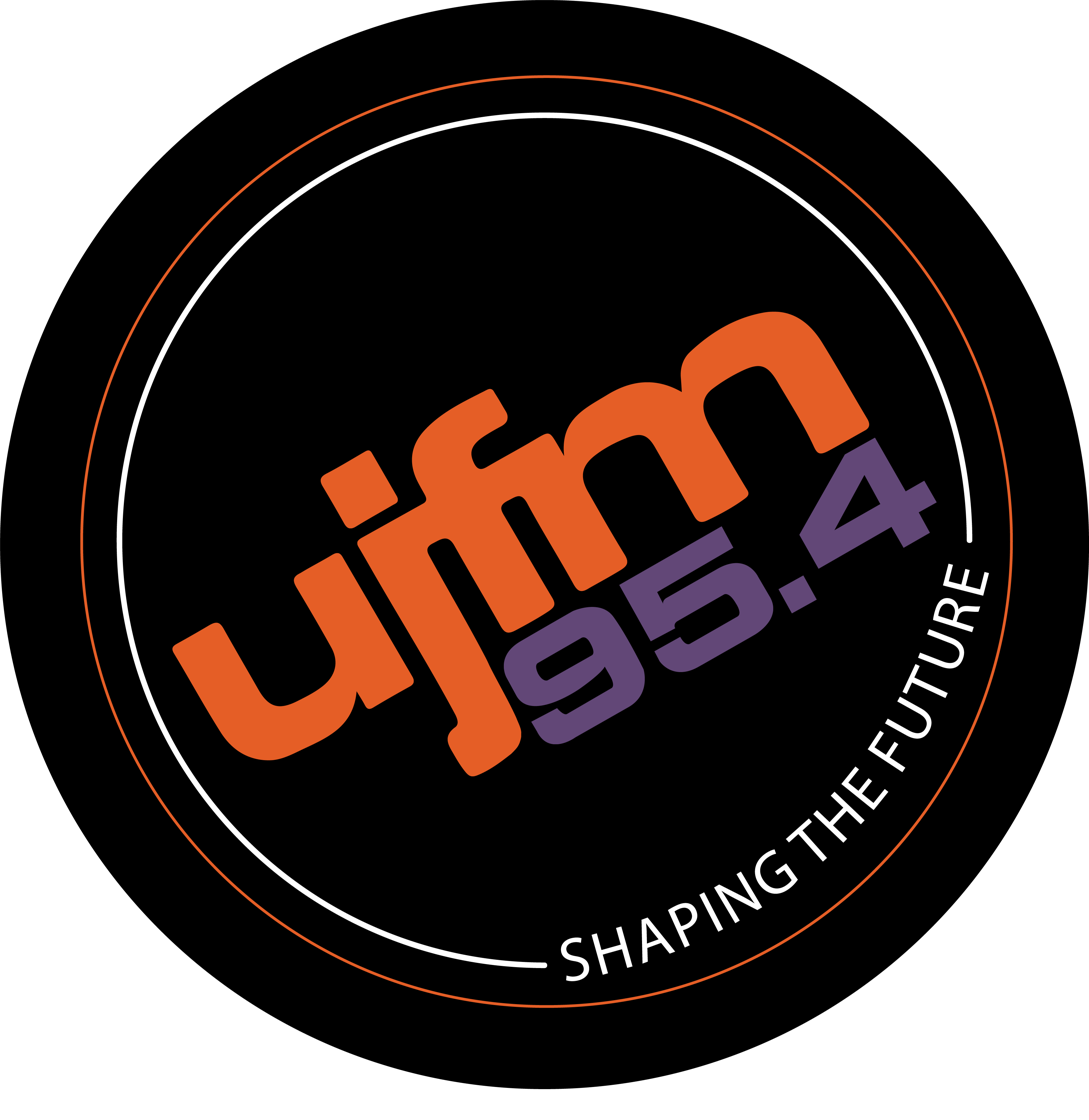
UJFM 95.4 LOGO

UJFM LOGO

UJFM 95.4 is a Community Radio Station, based at the University of Johannesburg, Bunting Road Campus. Previously known as RAU Radio, the station obtained a four-year community broadcasting licence in February 2004 on the frequency 95.4fm broadcasting under a new name. Broadcasting over a 50 km radius from the campus, the station employs registered students as well as outside presenters. The station aims to allow all staff members to learn and operate within a commercial station environment. Many ex-UJFM staff members have gone on to achieve success on radio and on other various media platforms.

UJFM 95.4 has transformed its on-air programming style and content, from a previously "Rock" music genre, to a commercial feel that includes an eclectic mix of music and talk that is pertinent to a primary target audience between the ages of 16 years and 28 years; reflecting the demographics of the UJ community and serving as an "info-tainment" portal. As the presence of UJFM firmly entrenches itself amongst the 4 campuses of UJ, the voice of UJFM strives to serve as a platform for healthy engagement amongst its community.

In April 2010, UJFM 95.4 moved into its new studios located at the Bunting Road Campus allowing for a professional radio broadcast environment.

== Presenters ==
UJFM Presenters
Name	Show	Days	Times
Bolele Polisa	The UJFM Super Breakfast	Weekdays	06:00am – 09:00am
Fif Frequency	The Urban Brunch	Weekdays	09:00am – 12:00am
Phumzile Nkuta	Ego Trip	Weekdays	12:00pm – 15:00pm
Nthle	UJFM DRIVE	Weekdays	15:00pm – 18:00pm
Mosa Kaiser	The Novel Leisure	Weekdays	18:00pm – 20:00pm
Shimmy Kekane	UJFM Weekend breakfast	Weekend	06:00am – 09:00am
Amor Hlabano	Cosmo Brunch	Saturday	10:00am – 13:00pm
Lebo Lipss	Hype Mode	Saturday	16:00pm – 19:00pm
Elizabeth Ampofo	The DJembe Train	Thursday	21:00pm – 00:00pm
Nick Explicit	Drive show	Weekdays	15:00pm – 18:00pm
Precious Nkadimeng	16 Bars	Wednesday	21:00pm – 00:00pm
Rose Mosenhoi	Urban Brunch	Weekdays	09:00am – 12:00pm
Thato Ditsebe	The Sound Of The Weekend Breakfast	Saturdays and Sundays	07:00am – 10:00am
Tshepiso Maretela	Loudspeaker	Saturday	22:00pm – 01:00am

== Newsreaders ==
Headlines are provided on the half-hour and the full news report on the hour.

- Andani Seditsha
- Elizabeth Ampofo
- Neo Nkosi
- Linda Khumalo
- Lindo Magasela
- Heidi Giokos
- Mummy Mohlahlo
- Precious Maputle
- Thobile Nkosi
- Sibusiso Ngwenya
- Steven Darge
- Thando Dhaza
- Luyanda Lebepe
- Buhle Hlatshwayo
- Delane N. Tsipa
- Thuli Pooe
- Veronica Makhaoli
- Mbali Motsoeneng
- Tshepang Masilo

== Sports Presenter ==
- Mashel Mokale
- Andile Ntuli
- Hope Thobejane

== Management ==
- Anathi Sidali

== Coverage areas and frequencies ==
- Greater Johannesburg (95.4 FM)

== Broadcast languages ==
- Predominantly English

== Broadcast time ==
- 24/7

== Target audience ==
- Age Group 16 - 28 in LSM Groups 6 – 10

== Programme format ==
- 65% Music (40% South African, 60% International)
- 35% Talk

== Listenership figures ==
Estimated Listenership
	7 Day
Feb 2013	18 000
Dec 2012	18 000
Oct 2012	17 000
Aug 2012	9 000
Jun 2012	14 000
