= Auckland Park =

- Location within Gauteng Location within South Africa
- Coordinates: 26.1890°S 28.0089°E
- Country: South Africa
- Province: Gauteng
- Municipality: City of Johannesburg
- Main Place: Johannesburg
- Established: 1888

Area
  - Total: 1.50 km^{2} (0.58 sq mi)

Population (2011)
  - Total: 3,276
  - Density: 2,180/km^{2} (5,660/sq mi)

Racial makeup (2011)
  - Black African: 51.7%
  - Coloured: 3.3%
  - Indian/Asian: 13.2%
  - White: 29.9%
  - Other: 1.9%

First languages (2011)
  - English: 41.2%
  - Afrikaans: 17.4%
  - Zulu: 9.5%
  - Tswana: 7.2%
  - Other: 24.7%
- Time zone: UTC+2 (SAST)
- Postal code (street): 2092
- PO box: 2006
- Area code: 010

Auckland Park is a suburb of Johannesburg, South Africa. It lies on a gentle slope, and is in close proximity to the suburbs of Melville, Brixton, Westdene and Richmond. Auckland Park is one of the few suburbs close to the Johannesburg city centre that has remained largely unaffected by the recent migration of Johannesburg residents to the city's northern suburbs. Auckland Park is home to a mix of nationalities and cultures, and the suburb is well known as the location of the South African Broadcasting Corporation headquarters.

== History ==
The suburb was laid out by John Landau in 1896, a New Zealander who named the area due to the similarities he experienced between the region and the city of Auckland, his native home. It was established in 1888 after the land was purchased from Petrus Lindeque and was part of an old Witwatersrand farm called Braamfontein. Landau would open the Auckland Park Hotel.

Street names in the area are named after places along the river Thames: Richmond, Twickenham, Ditton, Molesey and Kingston, among others. Some of the city of Johannesburg's first residents settled in Auckland Park, as the region was still considered to be "in the country" relative to the city centre. Victorian gentry who had made South Africa their home would have had weekend homes in the area. The original site offered a boating lake, located where The Country Club Johannesburg is today, as well as a horse racing track, where the University of Johannesburg (formerly RAU) is.

The Country Club Johannesburg, was built by the Auckland Park Real Estate Company on the grounds of the old hotel, opening on 22 December 1906 by Mayor W. Kidger Tucker with the lake fed by the Braamfontein Spruit.

== Education ==
Auckland Park is home to a number of academic institutions including the University of Johannesburg and private schools such as the Auckland Park Academy of Excellence, The Johannesburg Bible College (Auckland Park Campus), Auckland Park Nursery School and Auckland Park Preparatory School. The Deutsche Internationale Schule Johannesburg is in Auckland Park.
