= Melville, Johannesburg =

Melville (points of interest)
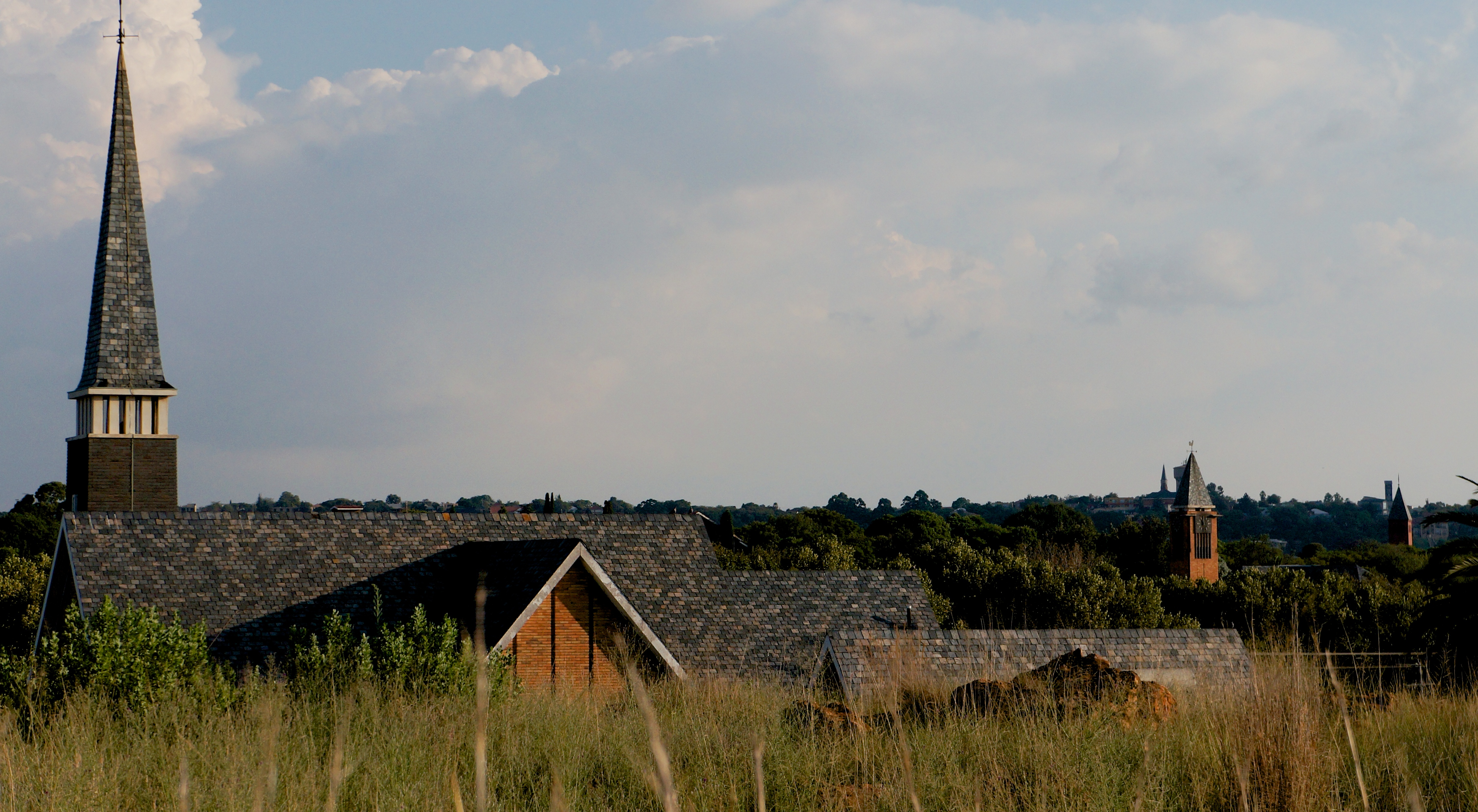
- Melville, Johannesburg

- Location within Gauteng Location within South Africa
- Coordinates: 26°10′33″S 28°0′32″E
- Country: South Africa
- Province: Gauteng
- Municipality: City of Johannesburg
- Main Place: Johannesburg
- Established: 1896

Area
  - Total: 1.72 km^{2} (0.66 sq mi)

Population (2011)
  - Total: 3,355
  - Density: 1,950/km^{2} (5,050/sq mi)

Racial makeup (2011)
  - Black African: 33.4%
  - Coloured: 3.2%
  - Indian/Asian: 5.2%
  - White: 55.6%
  - Other: 2.7%

First languages (2011)
  - English: 50.4%
  - Afrikaans: 22.7%
  - Zulu: 6.4%
  - Tswana: 4.5%
  - Other: 15.9%
- Time zone: UTC+2 (SAST)
- Postal code (street): 2092
- PO box: 2109

Melville is a bohemian suburb of Johannesburg, Gauteng, South Africa. It is the location of many restaurants and taverns, which are mostly frequented by students from the nearby University of Johannesburg, located in Auckland Park, and the University of the Witwatersrand, located in Braamfontein. It is one of the city's most popular tourist destinations. The suburb is to the west of the Johannesburg CBD. It is located in Region B of the City of Johannesburg Metropolitan Municipality.

== History ==
Prior to the discovery of gold on the Witwatersrand in 1886, the suburb lay on land of one of the original farms that make up Johannesburg, called Braamfontein. The suburb was proclaimed on 5 October 1896, and is named after the land surveyor, Edward Harker Vincent Melvill. In the public sale notice, the suburb was described as a "picturesque and healthy spot in the vicinity of Johannesburg with a magnificent view of the wooded country to the north with the blue Pretoria ranges stretching like lines of steel against the horizon".

== Geography ==
Melville is also well known for the Melville Koppies (an archaeological site, with rolling hills of grassland with views over the city), and is near the historic suburb of Sophiatown.

== Culture and contemporary life ==
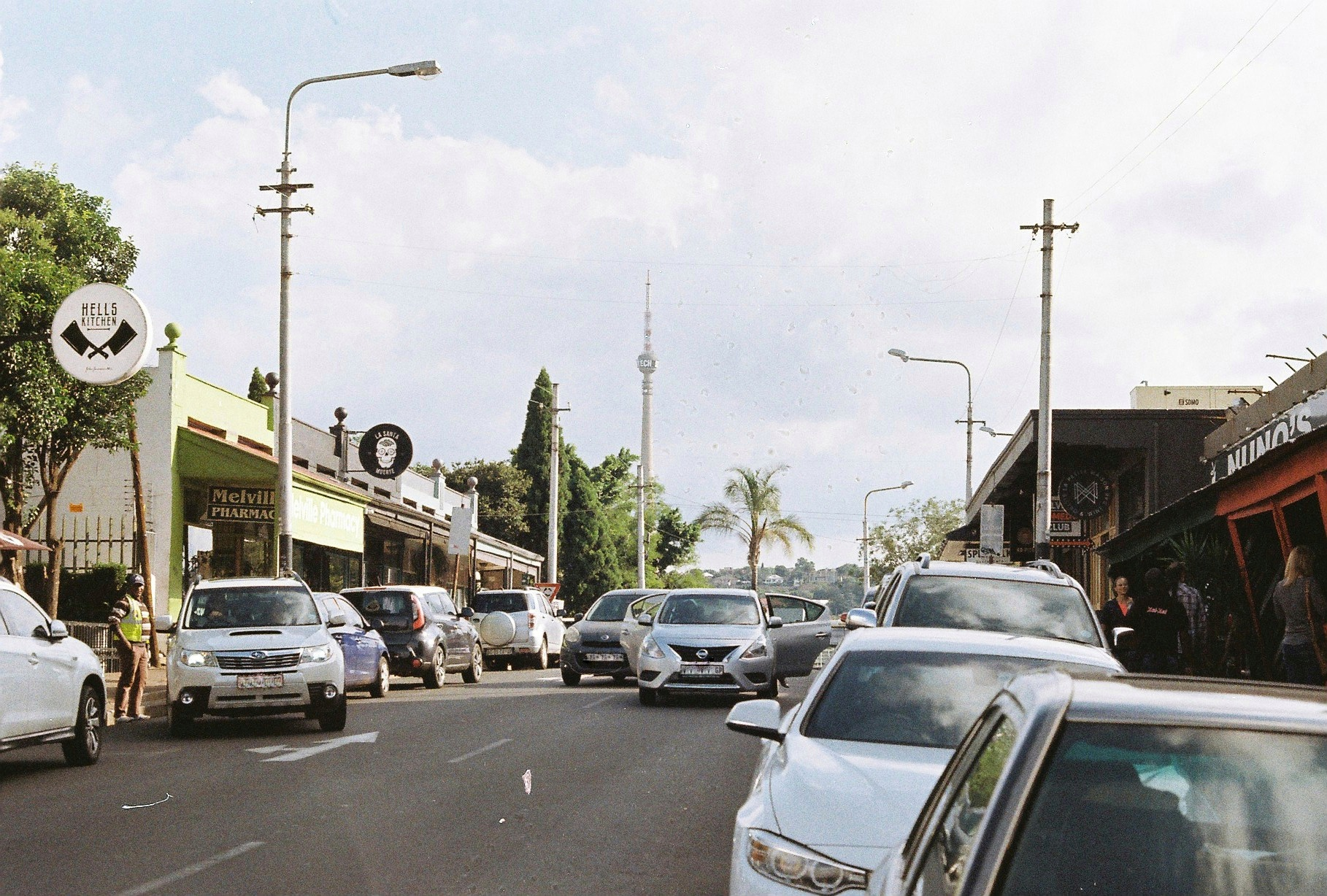
Street in Melville

The area, along with Parkhurst, Greenside, Parkview, Norwood and Emmarentia, is one of the many areas of the Northern Suburbs still to have high streets with cafes, restaurants and shops lining the streets rather than in enclosed shopping centres. In Melville, the majority of these are located along 7th Street, although there are also several on other streets, such as 4th Avenue and Main Street (where there is also a supermarket).

There are over 30 guest houses in the vicinity, and Melville is a popular stopover in Johannesburg for tourists. On 7th Street, in addition to restaurants, there are several bars and a tattoo studio; the street is a popular hang-out for the cosmopolitan crowd.

The popular soap opera, 7de Laan, used views of 7th Street, Melville in its opening visuals.
