= Matthew Chaskalson =

South African lawyer (born 1963)

Matthew Chaskalson SC
- Born: 12 August 1963 (age 61)
- Education: King David School, Linksfield
- Alma mater: University of the Witwatersrand
- Occupation: Lawyer
- Parent: Arthur Chaskalson

Matthew Chaskalson SC (born 12 August 1963) is a South African lawyer and jurist who is best known for his work in constitutional litigation. He has frequently appeared in the Constitutional Court of South Africa and led evidence at both the Marikana Commission and the State Capture Commission. The son of Chief Justice Arthur Chaskalson, he was an acting judge in the Constitutional Court for two terms in 2023 and 2024.

== Early life and education ==
Chaskalson was born on 12 August 1963. He was the eldest of two sons born to Arthur Chaskalson, who was a prominent anti-apartheid lawyer and who later served as Chief Justice of South Africa from 2001 to 2005. He attended King David School in Linksfield, Johannesburg, where he matriculated in 1980. Thereafter he attended the University of the Witwatersrand, completing a BA in 1984, Honours in 1985, and an LLB in 1990, all cum laude.

== Legal career ==
After his graduation, Chaskalson was a candidate attorney from 1990 to 1991, working in Johannesburg at the mining law firm of Bell Dewar Hall. In 1992, he returned to his alma mater, initially as a lecturer in delict and constitutional law and then, from 1995 to 2000, as head of the constitutional law project at the university's Centre for Applied Legal Studies.

Although he was admitted to the bar in 1994, he did not practise as an advocate full-time until 2001, when he joined the Johannesburg Bar as junior counsel. He was awarded silk in 2009, and as senior counsel he was a founding member of the Victoria Mxenge Group in 2011 and the Pan African Bar Association of South Africa in 2018. Judges Matter described the Mxenge Group as "a nascent project to effect racial, gender and diversity transformation in the advocates’ profession", and the Pan African Bar Association was founded as an explicitly "black and women-oriented" organisation.

Chaskalson was prolific in litigation in the Supreme Court of Appeal and Constitutional Court of South Africa; indeed, for several years, he frequently argued cases in front of his father's bench. He attained additional public prominence as a member of the staffs of two high-profile commissions of inquiry: he led evidence at the Marikana Commission from 2012 to 2014, where he worked alongside Mbuyiseli Madlanga and Geoff Budlender, and later at the State Capture Commission from 2019 to 2021, where he led the questioning of Deputy Minister Zizi Kodwa. His work at the State Capture Commission focused on illicit financial flows and he later assisted the National Prosecuting Authority's Asset Forfeiture Unit in related civil recovery efforts.

=== Notable briefs ===
Chaskalson has appeared in important cases in a broad variety of areas of constitutional law. In 1996, at the outset of the constitutional era, he argued in cases pertaining to the certification both of the Constitution of South Africa and of the provincial constitution of KwaZulu-Natal. In other notable administrative law matters, he represented the state in Fedsure Life Assurance v Johannesburg, Billy Masetlha in Masetlha v President, and (as senior counsel) Corruption Watch in Corruption Watch v President. Conversely, he appeared in an important series of cases on discrimination in family law, both relating to gender discrimination (as in Bhe v Magistrate, Khayelitsha, Daniels v Campbell, and Fraser v Children's Court) and to discrimination on the basis of sexual orientation (as in Du Toit v Minister of Welfare and Population Development, Gory v Kolver, and National Coalition for Gay and Lesbian Equality v Minister of Justice). A final major strand of litigation concerned freedom of expression (including in Islamic Unity Convention v Independent Broadcasting Authority, Khumalo v Holomisa, Phillips v DPP, and S v Mamabolo).

=== Constitutional Court ===
In October 2023, President Cyril Ramaphosa announced that he would appoint Chaskalson as an acting judge of the Constitutional Court for two consecutive terms, first from 1 November to 15 December 2023 and then from 1 February to 31 March 2024.

During this acting service, but before he had issued any judgment from the bench, Chaskalson became one of five candidates whom the Judicial Service Commission shortlisted for possible permanent appointment to the Constitutional Court. The other candidates were Tati Makgoka, Ashton Schippers, Alan Dodson, and David Bilchitz. However, shortly before the candidates were interviewed in April 2024, Chaskalson withdrew from the contest due to injuries he had sustained in a cycling accident.

== Scholarship ==
Chaskalson edited the first and second editions of Constitutional Law of South Africa, a constitutional law textbook which the Mail & Guardian called the field's "bible", and co-authored the first edition of South African Mineral and Petroleum Law, which Judges Matter called the "leading publication" in South African mining law. In addition, with Richard Spitz, he co-authored The Politics of Transition: The Hidden History of South Africa's Negotiated Settlement, a political history of the negotiations to end apartheid. He has also written several influential articles in constitutional law; among other things, his work on property rights was cited by the Constitutional Court in FNB v Commissioner for SARS, the locus classicus on the South African property clause.

== Personal life ==
Chaskalson is Jewish. He is married and has three children.
