= King David High School, Liverpool =

King David High School

Location
- Childwall Road, Wavertree; Liverpool, England, L15 6WU

Information
- Type: Voluntary aided school
- Motto: Let there be Light through Faith and Work
- Religious affiliation: Judaism
- Established: 1954
- Local authority: Liverpool City Council
- Department for Education URN: 104703 Tables
- Ofsted: Reports
- Chair of Governors: Michelle Hayward
- Headteacher: Michael Sutton
- Gender: Coeducational
- Age: 11 to 18
- Enrolment: 629
- Houses: Sharon, Galil, Negev, Kinneret
- Colours: Red, Green, Yellow, Blue
- Website: https://www.kingdavidliverpool.co.uk/

King David High School is a mixed voluntary aided Jewish ethos-based secondary school located in the Wavertree district of Liverpool, England. It provides Jewish education, but also admits and caters to students of other faiths.

== Building ==
In September 2011, the primary and secondary schools moved into a new three-storey building, as part of the Building Schools for the Future (BSF) programme.

== Notable former staff ==
- Clive Lawton (b.1951), educator, broadcaster and writer who co-founded the educational charity Limmud, is a former head of the school.

== Notable alumni ==
- Ian Broudie, singer-songwriter, musician, and record producer
- Malandra Burrows, actress and singer
- Guy Chambers, musician and composer
- Simon Fishel, IVF professor
- Ron Hesketh, Anglican priest and former RAF Chaplain-in-Chief
- Jason Isaacs, actor
- Missy Bo Kearns, footballer for Liverpool FC Women
- Stuart Polak, Baron Polak, Conservative politician and member of the House of Lords
- Mark Simpson, composer and clarinet player
- Neal Skupski, tennis player
- David Wolfson, Baron Wolfson of Tredegar, politician, barrister, and life peer
- Michael Woodford, business executive

== See also ==
- Jewish day school
- King David School (disambiguation), for other King David Schools
