= Victory Park, Johannesburg =

Victory Park
- Victory Park's location in Gauteng
- Coordinates: 26°12′06″S 28°02′27″E
- Country: South Africa
- Province: Gauteng
- Municipality: City of Johannesburg
- Main Place: Johannesburg
- Established: January 1919

Area
  - Total: 1.50 km^{2} (0.58 sq mi)

Population (2011)
  - Total: 2,402
  - Density: 1,601/km^{2} (4,150/sq mi)

Races
  - White: 53.4%
  - Asian: 7.5%
  - Cape Coloured: 3.0%
  - Black: 33.9%
  - Other: 1.2%

Languages
  - English: 48.3%
  - Afrikaans: 7.5%
  - Zulu: 15.9%
  - Tswana: 15.0%
  - Other: 13.4%

Victory Park is a suburb of Johannesburg, South Africa, around 6 km north-west of City Hall.

Victory Park covers 1.6 km^{2}, including several smallholdings and a pair of blocks that include the private Jewish high school in the King David Schools network and the Victory Park Hebrew Congregation building. To the north is Delta Park in Blairgowrie, to the northeast is Craighall Park, to the east is Parkhurst, to the southeast is Greenside, to the southwest is Emmarentia, and to the west is Linden. In the old municipal borders, Victory Park was part of Johannesburg and separated by Linden from Randburg.

== History ==
Victory Park was founded on Braamfontein Farm in January 1919. The name was in honor of the Allied victory in World War I.

During the apartheid era, it was classed as a "whites only" area under the terms of the Group Areas Act. It was historically a centre for Johannesburg's Jewish community. In 1970, Jews made up 49.3% of the resident population.

== King David Victory Park ==
In 1960, King David Primary School Victory Park opened on the site of a former peach farm. It was responding to a local need as there was a significant Jewish population residing n Victory Park, Emmarentia and Greenside. In 1964, King David High School Victory Park was established and led by Eddie Tannenbaum, vice-principal at King David Linksfield.

Victory Park Hebrew Congregation was later built on the school grounds to serve the school and the local community. The local Jewish community has been perceived to be less traditional than its counterparts in Linksfield and Glenhazel.

In more recent years, enrolment has dwindled as a demographic shift has seen an increasing number of Jewish families relocate to the north of the city, in Sandton and to the east towards Glenhazel and Linksfield. The school closed in December 2025 and the students were given the option to transfer to King David's other campuses. Most students were recorded moving to King David Linksfield or/and Red Hill after the closure of King David Victory Park School. The closure forms part of a long-term strategy aiming to strengthen the King David network and make it sustainable. It is part of a consolidation effort that will see the network operate from a smaller number of schools and campuses.

== Sources ==
- Raper, Peter Edmund (2004). New Dictionary of South African Place Names. Johannesburg/Cape Town: Jonathan Ball Publishers.
- Stals, Prof. Dr. E.L.P (ed.) (1978). Afrikaners in die Goudstad, vol. 1: 1886 - 1924. Cape Town/Pretoria: HAUM.

Victory Park's crime rating has slightly increase within the last 5 years (as of 2026 August) as they're have been multiple cases of physical crime (assault, battery, sexual assault, roberry etc.) within the delta park region of the suburb.
