= Limmud FSU =

International Jewish education organization

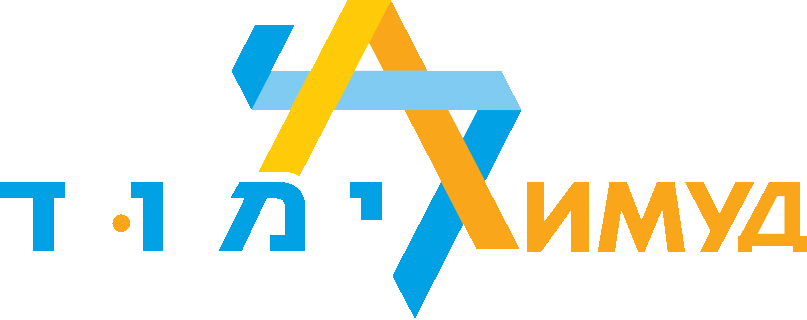
- Founders: Chaim Chesler, founder (Israel); Sandra F. Cahn, co-founder (United States)
- Type: 501(c)(3) not-for-profit organization
- Purpose: Education
- Key people: Matthew Bronfman, chair of the Limmud FSU International Steering Committee; Aaron Frenkel (Monaco), President; Natasha Chechik, Executive Director
- Website: www.limmudfsu.org

Limmud FSU (Former Soviet Union) is an international Jewish education organization that focuses on educating young Jewish adults that have roots in the Former Soviet Union about their Jewish identity and culture. It was developed in 2006 by Chaim Chesler, founder (Israel); Sandra F. Cahn, co-founder (United States). Limmud (from the Hebrew word meaning "to learn") was originally a British-Jewish educational charity, which produces a large annual winter conference at Warwick University and several other events around the year in the UK on the theme of Jewish learning.

== History ==
Limmud FSU holds educational conferences in United States, Israel, Europe, Ukraine, Australia, Canada, Azerbaijan, Georgia and Moldova. Limmud FSU engages with young Jewish adults of Former Soviet Union backgrounds, offering them the tools to gain a better understanding of their Jewish identity and if they wish, to assume leadership roles in their local communities.

Limmud FSU events present Jewish learning and culture in its broadest sense through pluralistic, egalitarian volunteer-run conferences covering traditional subjects like the Bible and Talmud, to history, politics, Israel, the Middle-East conflict, theater, music and dance, the arts, literature and poetry, to Jewish cuisine, humor and folklore and much more.

Limmud ("study" in Hebrew), the volunteer-driven Jewish learning experience, started in the United Kingdom in 1980 and since then has spread to over 80 Jewish communities across the world, awakening inspiration in tens of thousands of participants. In the words of The Jerusalem Post, "Every place that has Jews should have its own Limmud."

In adapting the Limmud model to the special requirements of Jewish audiences from the Former Soviet Union world-wide, Limmud FSU has developed a unique approach to cultural and educational activities, through lectures, presentations and workshops specially designed for the needs of young Jewish adults who were deprived of the opportunity to learn about their culture during 70 years of Communist rule in the Soviet Union.

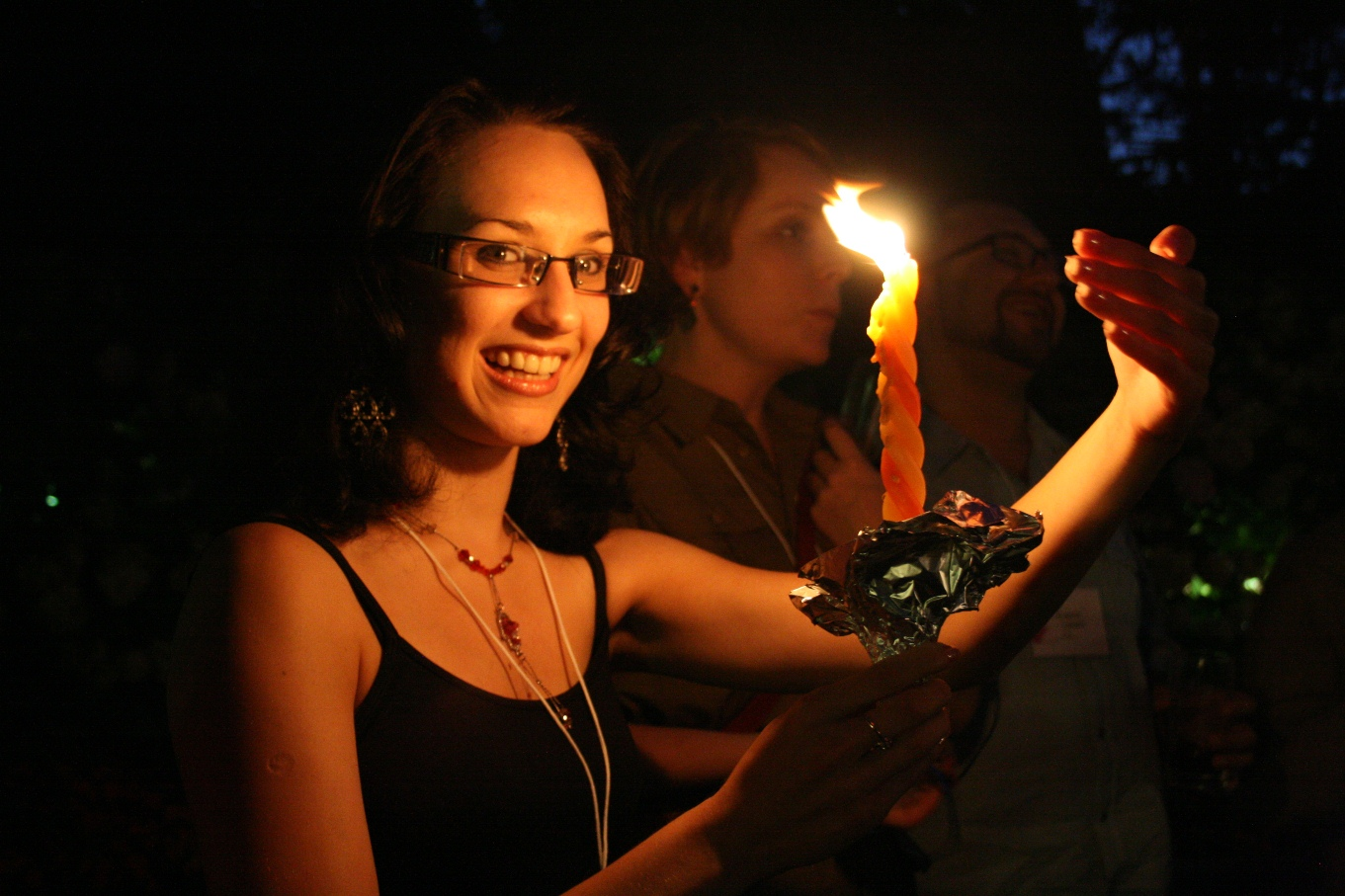
Limmud FSU New York

== Organizational structure ==
Limmud FSU is governed by an International Steering Committee (ISC), which approves its programs and budgets. The ISC has representatives from supporting organizations, donor foundations and sponsors, as well as individuals who actively promote Limmud FSU’s educational and cultural work.

An Executive Committee sets operational policy for Limmud FSU, authorizes budgetary adjustments between ISC sessions and sets guidelines for the preparation of the annual work plan. Currently, its members include: Matthew Bronfman, Chairman; Aaron Frenkel, President; Sandra Cahn, Co-Founder and Chair of the FRD Committee, and Chaim Chesler, Founder, Limmud FSU, and Chair of the Executive Committee.

A professional project manager and staff in each country reports to the Executive Director, Natasha Chechik.

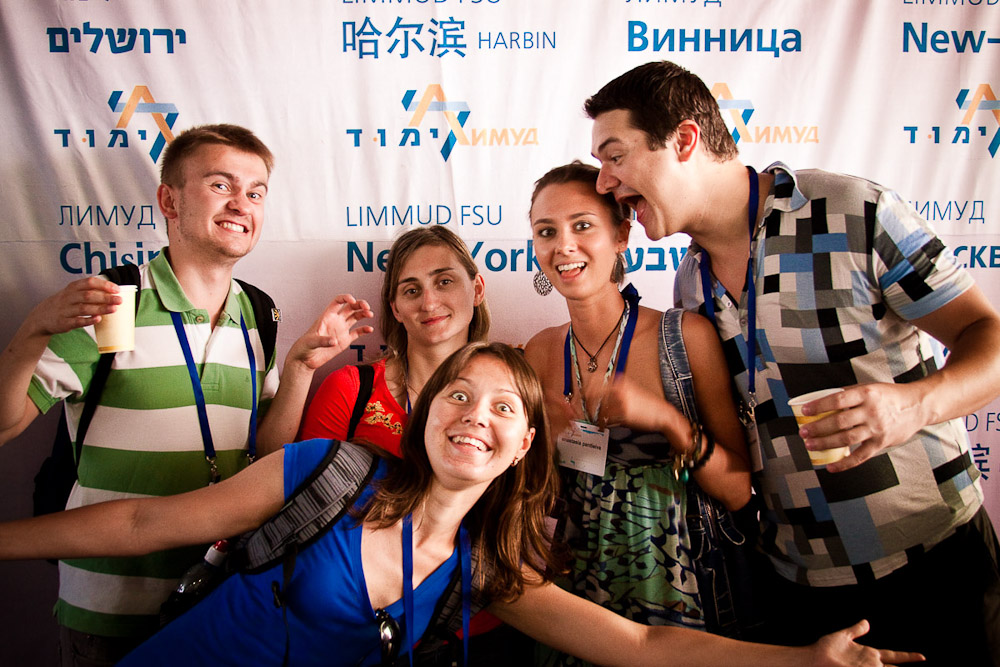
Limmud FSU Beer Sheva, Israel

== Funding ==
Limmud FSU International Foundation is registered in the United States as a 501(c)(3) not-for-profit organization, recognized by the Internal Revenue Service (IRS). Limmud FSU follows a policy of gradual incremental rises in the level of participation fees to ensure appropriate payment for a quality program. The aim is to bring each community to a level of 80 percent of the direct costs of their conferences. Currently, a global network of private individuals and partner organizations funds annual Limmud FSU conferences and volunteer training sessions.

== Limmud FSU Labs ==
Limmud FSU Labs is a joint project of Limmud FSU and the Ministry of Diaspora Affairs of the State of Israel, established in 2019. The goal is to create a meaningful and ongoing platform for varying forms of Jewish expression among different communities of young Russian-speaking Jews around the world, in order to promote a sense of national, collective and personal identity with the Jewish people and with the State of Israel.

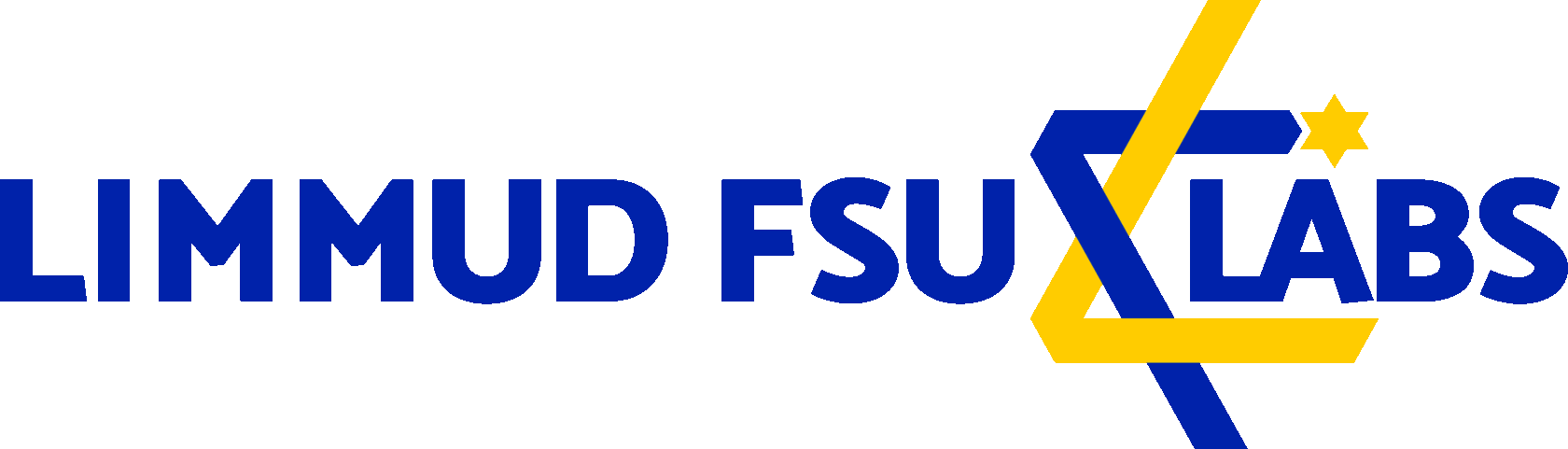
Limmud FSU Labs logo

Through the project, regional "Laboratories" are being created to provide comprehensive support, both professional and financial, for the development of educational and community initiatives among young Jews with roots in the FSU. It operates in the 11 centers where Limmud FSU annual conferences currently take place, with an aim to provide an ongoing Jewish experience between the main Limmud FSU events. However, initiatives can be realized not only in the cities where Limmud FSU events have already occurred, but also in any other city in the following countries and centers: Ukraine, Moldova, Australia, Canada, United States and Western Europe.

== Timeline ==
Below is a timeline of Limmud FSU's key conferences:

Year	City
2006	Moscow (Russia)
2007	Moscow (Russia)
2008	Moscow (Russia) Leadership Training
	Ashqelon (Israel)
	Yalta (Ukraine)
2009	Moscow (Russia)
	Jerusalem (Israel)
	Hamptons (New York)
	Birobidzhan (Far East Russia)
2010	Jerusalem (Israel)
	Hamptons (New York)
	Moscow (Russia)
	Truskavets (Ukraine)
	Odesa (Ukraine)
	New Orleans – 5th Anniversary
2011	Moscow (Russia)
	Beersheba (Israel)
	Vinnytsia (Ukraine)
	St Petersburg (Russia)
	Odesa (Ukraine)
	Global Leadership Summit (Jerusalem, Israel)
2012	Moscow (Russia)
	Princeton (US)
	Chișinău (Moldova)
	St Petersburg (Russia)
	Uzhhorod (Ukraine)
	Nazareth Illit (Israel)
2013	Princeton (US)
	Moscow (Russia)
	Vitebsk (Belarus)
	Odesa (Ukraine)
	St Petersburg (Russia)
	Jerusalem (Israel)
	New York – 7th Anniversary
2014	Parsippany New Jersey (US)
	Moscow (Russia)
	Toronto, Ontario (Canada) - Deerhurst
	Chișinău (Moldova)
	Global Leadership Summit (Jerusalem, Israel)
2015	Toronto, Ontario (Canada) - Blue Mountain Resort
	Melbourne (Australia)
	Moscow (Russia)
	Lviv (Ukraine)
	Kibbutz Ginossar (Israel)
	New York
	Chișinău (Moldova)
	Sydney (Australia)
	Kazan
2016	Toronto, Ontario (Canada) - Schwartz/Reisman Centre
	Sydney (Australia)
	Moscow (Russia)
	New York
	Minsk (Belarus)
	Eilat (Israel)
	Los Angeles
	Lviv (Ukraine)
	Saint Petersburg (Russia)
2017	Windsor, Berkshire (United Kingdom)
	Toronto, Ontario (Canada)
	Moscow (Russia)
	New York
	San Francisco
	Odesa (Ukraine)
	Saint Petersburg (Russia)
	Chișinău (Moldova)
	Eilat (Israel)
2018	Sydney (Australia)
	Toronto, Ontario (Canada)
	Moscow (Russia)
	Warsaw, Poland - Global Leadership Summit
	New York - Columbia University
	Lviv (Ukraine)
	Jerusalem (Israel)
2019	Saint Petersburg (Russia)
	Moscow (Russia)
	Minsk (Belarus)
	New York
	Chișinău (Moldova)
	Odesa (Ukraine)
	Ashdod (Israel)
2020	Vienna (Austria)
2021	Moscow
	New York
	Palo Alto
	Kazan (Russia)
	Lviv (Ukraine)
	Kibbutz Shefayim (Israel)
2022	New York
	Toronto
	Baku (Azerbaijan)
	Boston
	Sydney
	Melbourne
	Tiberias (Israel)
	Warsaw
2023	Berlin
	Baku
	Lublin
	Tel-Aviv
2024	Uzhhorod
	Baku
	Tbilisi
	Uzhhorod (2nd event)
	Toronto
	Tel Aviv
2025	Baku
	Khmelnik (Ukraine)
	Lviv
	Zikhron Ya'akov (Israel)
2026	Canada (Limmud At Sea)
	Baku
	Israel Camp (Jerusalem)

== See also ==
- Limmud
- Limmud International
- Limmud South Africa
