= Limmud =

Jewish-British educational charity

- Founded: 1980
- Founders: Clive Lawton, Alastair Falk, Michael May, Jonathan Benjamin
- Type: Jewish educational charity
- Location: London, United Kingdom
- Region served: UK (the movement is worldwide)
- Website: www.limmud.org

Limmud is a British-Jewish educational charity which, in the UK, produces a large annual winter festival and several other regional events throughout the year on the theme of Jewish learning. Limmud is not affiliated to any strand of Judaism, stating "We have no part to play in the debates between/across denominations" in its mission statement. Limmud markets itself as open to "anyone interested in Jewish learning". The Limmud event in the UK has inspired a worldwide movement of Limmud groups, so the name 'Limmud' now refers both to the UK charity and the worldwide network (Limmud itself only operates in the UK). Its motto is "wherever you find yourself, Limmud will take you one step further on your Jewish journey."

Limmud (from Hebrew 'to learn') was originally a conference for "educators", basing itself on CAJE, the Conference on Alternatives in Jewish Education of North America. Taking CAJE's volunteer ethos, not paying presenters and not using people's titles, Limmud has grown to be a large international movement. During the 1990s there was the significant change as Limmud reinvented itself as a community gathering, giving rise to a significant increase in the number of attendees and leading it to be described as "British Jewry's greatest export". The Limmud model has now spread to many other countries.

A distinctive feature of Limmud is that the events are organised by volunteers, who also take part as equals in what is now called the Limmud Festival (held in the UK). Limmud Festival's largest group of volunteers are in their 20s and 30s. Around half of the UK "Forty under 40" (a community-wide initiative to identify the future leaders of British Jewry, published by Jewish News) have volunteered for Limmud and a former Chair of Limmud, Elliott Goldstein, topped the list.

== History ==
Limmud's first conference, held in 1980, was attended by 80 people. It was organised by Alastair Falk, Michael May, Jonathan Benjamin and Clive Lawton, and was inspired by a visit to the Coalition for the Advancement of Jewish Education (CAJE) in North America. Its aim was to build bridges between professional and nonprofessional educators and between those of differing religious commitments. The next year participation had doubled and all aspects of Jewish learning were covered.

By 1996 the main Limmud conference had expanded and moved to Oxford with attendance of over 1,000, 250 sessions and 140 speakers, becoming the largest Jewish conference in Europe. During this period the organisation also held smaller one day events in Glasgow and Leeds.

In 1999 the first non-UK Limmud was held in Sydney, Australia.

2006 saw Limmud appoint its first full-time Executive Director, Raymond Simonson. Prior to this Limmud had been run by part-time directors.

The late 2000s saw Limmud participation in the UK grow dramatically. In 2007 Limmud held its conference at Warwick University, with 2,000 participants and 600 at Limmud Fest, a smaller summer festival. Numbers more than doubled in 2008, to 7,000 for its UK events. International conferences were now held in Cape Town, Johannesburg, Hungary, Atlanta, Buenos Aires, Bulgaria, Los Angeles, Philadelphia, Poland, Stockholm, Ukraine, Germany, Turkey, Toronto, New York and France.

In 2015, Limmud Conference moved to Birmingham, with a record 2,800 participants. New Limmud groups included Arizona, Mar del Plata, Australia, Tel Aviv, Chile and Essen. In 2017 Limmud Conference became Limmud Festival. Limmud set up affiliates in North America and Israel. Limmud estimates there are 40,000 participants annually in a Limmud worldwide, run by 4,000 volunteers. In 2017 Limmud was also awarded the Jerusalem Unity Prize for contribution to Jewish life, presented by Israeli President Rivlin.

In 2018 and 2019, formal legal entities were set up to co-ordinate and support Limmud teams in North America and Israel. A structural review in 2020 recommended the creation of a new global entity to represent Limmud groups around the world.

== Organisation ==
Limmud is a company and a charity. It is run by a board of directors and trustees, all of whom are volunteers. Initially, there was no difference between Limmud the organisation and Limmud Conference, the annual event, so the chairs of the Conference/Festival team were the chairs of the organisation. In 1990, a chair for the organisation who was separate from the Conference chairs was appointed for the first time. In 2006, Limmud International was created, as a separate unit within Limmud to manage relationships with other Limmud groups around the world. Limmud International was absorbed back into Limmud at the end of 2016.

Chairs of Limmud Conference/Festival

- 1980–1981 Alistair Falk, Michael May, Jonathan Benjamin, Clive Lawton
- 1982–1984 Steve Miller
- 1985 Tina Elliott
- 1986 Jonathan Benjamin
- 1987 Alan Wilkinson
- 1988 Madeline Ismach
- 1989 Alistair Falk
- 1990–1994 Andrew Gilbert
- 1995 Natan Tiefenbrun
- 1996 Yvonne Krasner, Marc Soloway, Judy Trotter
- 1997 Micah Gold, Jonny Persey, Marc Soloway
- 1998 Micah Gold
- 1999 Jacqueline Nicholls, Claire Straus
- 2000 Andrew Levy, Abe Sterne
- 2001 Claire Mandel, Carolyn Bogush
- 2002 Juliet Simmons
- 2003 Fleurise Luder, Eliot Kaye
- 2004 Batya Elliott, Paul Turner
- 2005 David Century, Shoshana Bloom
- 2006 Jason Caplin, Natalie Grazin
- 2007 Kevin Sefton
- 2008 Libby Burkeman, Charles Darwish
- 2009 Rebecca Lester, David Israel
- 2010 Danielle Nagler, Steven Fisher
- 2011 Shoshana Bloom, Jonathan Walters
- 2012 David Renton
- 2013 Oliver Marcus, Richard Verber
- 2014 Shana Boltin, Jonathan Robinson
- 2015 Joanna Ish-Horowicz, Michael Gladstone, Claire Samuel
- 2016 Benjamin Crowne, Steven Weller
- 2017 Abigail Jacobi, Anna Lawton
- 2018 Jonathan Robinson
- 2019 Ben Lewis, Hannah Brady, Dan Heller
- 2020 Robert Simmons
- 2021 Ben Combe
- 2022 Jonathan Robinson
- 2023 Hannah Gaventa
- 2024
- 2025 Jake Berger, Sarah Rose
- 2026 Gaia Ottman, Jacob Smith

Chairs of Limmud

- 1990–1997 Andrew Gilbert
- 1998–2001 Judy Trotter
- 1998–2000 Natan Tiefenbrun
- 2001–2003 Claire Straus
- 2003–2005 Claire Mandel
- 2006–2009 Elliott Goldstein
- 2010–2012 Carolyn Bogush
- 2013–2015 Kevin Sefton
- 2016–2019 David Hoffman
- 2019–2020 Shoshana Bloom
- 2020–2025 Carolyn Bogush
- 2025– Benjamin Ellis

Chairs of Limmud International

- 2006–2009 Andrew Gilbert
- 2010–2012 Uri Berkowitz, Helena Miller
- 2013–2014 David Hoffman
- 2015–2016 David Bilchitz

Chairs of Limmud Global Board

- 2020–2021 Shoshana Bloom

Chairs of Limmud UK Executive

- 2021–2023 Ysabella Hawkings, Abigail Jacobi

=== Staff ===
Limmud's first professional appointment in 1998 was of Clive Lawton as part-time Executive Director; he gradually became backed by a full-time administrator. In 2006 Limmud recruited its first full-time Executive Director, Raymond Simonson, former Director of UJIA Makor: The Centre for Informal Jewish Education. When Simonson became Chief Executive of London's Jewish Community Centre, now JW3, in 2012, he was succeeded by Shelley Marsh. She stepped down from the role in 2015. Mike Schindler was the Limmud Director of Operations and the senior professional in the organisation between March and August 2015, and then Dani Serlin was Acting Executive Director until February 2016. In February 2016, Limmud appointed Chief Executive, Eli Ovits, as senior professional. Ovits left in 2020.

== Limmud events in the UK ==
=== Limmud Festival ===
Limmud Festival (until 2017 known as Limmud Conference), takes place every year in the last week of December and is the organisation's flagship event. It was inspired by the CAJE conference in the United States, and now attracts more than 2,000 participants annually; in 2015 the numbers rose to 2,750. A typical day at Limmud Festival includes around 200 sessions spanning religious, cultural and political aspects of Jewish life. After the first conferences at Carmel College (Oxfordshire), Limmud Conference has been held at Portsmouth Polytechnic (1984), Oxford Brookes University (1986–1994), Worcester (1995–96), Manchester (1997), the University of Nottingham (1998–2006) and Warwick University (2007–14). Since 2015 this annual event has been held at the hotels surrounding Pendigo Lake, near Birmingham, except for the 2020 and 2021 festivals, held during the COVID-19 pandemic, which were online events.

=== Limmud summer events ===
Limmud held a summer event in the last week of August which was called Limmud Fest from 2004 to 2012 and Limmud in the Woods from 2013 to 2016. It involved camping as well as staying indoors, had a less intense programme centred on Shabbat and was more cultural and outdoors-focused than its winter sibling. Limmud Fest had a peak attendance of 650 people; Limmud in the Woods was attended by around 200–250 young adults and young families.

=== Day and weekend Limmud events ===
The first Day Limmud was in Sheffield in the early 1980s, followed by Leeds in the mid-1990s. Day and weekend Limmuds are now held at a number of venues in the UK, including Birmingham, Cambridge, Harrow, Hull, Leeds, Liverpool, Manchester, and the Thames Valley. Limmud events have also been held in Bournemouth, Brighton, Glasgow, Hackney, London, Newcastle upon Tyne, South London and South East London.

=== Other Limmud events in UK ===
Other events run by Limmud in the UK, either on their own or in partnership with others, have included music events and the Florence Melton Adult Mini-School, organised in partnership with the London Jewish Cultural Centre.

== Limmuds around the world ==
The Limmud model has now spread to many other countries. More than ninety communities in 42 countries on six continents have hosted Limmud events including Hong Kong, Peru, India, Montenegro, Mallorca and Jamaica.

Limmud events around the world have included:

UK
Limmud Bristol SW, Limmud Cambridge, Limmud Festival, Limmud Harrow, Limmud Hull, Limmud Leeds, Limmud Liverpool, Limmud Manchester, Limmud Midlands, Limmud Scotland, Limmud Thames Valley

Africa, Asia and Australasia

Australia: Limmud Canberra, Limmud Oz Melbourne, Limmud Oz Perth, Limmud Oz Sydney
Limmud New Zealand
Limmud China: Limmud Beijing, Limmud Shanghai
Limmud India
Limmud Réunion

South Africa

Limmud SA: Limmud Cape Cape Town, Limmud Durban, Limmud Johannesburg

North America

USA: Limmud AZ, Limmud Bay Area, Limmud Boca, Limmud Boston, Limmud Chicago + MW, Limmud LA, Limmud Miami, Limmud Michigan, Limmud NOLA, Limmud NY, Limmud Philly, Limmud Seattle
Canada: Limmud Kingston, Limmud Ottawa, Limmud Toronto, Limmud Vancouver, Limmud Winnipeg

Latin America

Argentina: Limmud Buenos Aires, Limmud Mar Del Plata, Limmud Bogota, Limmud Caracas, Limmud Chile, Limmud Costa Rica, Limmud Mexico

Europe

Limmud Baltics (covers Estonia, Latvia and Lithuania); Limmud Czech Republic – Slovak Republic; Limmud ExYu (covers Macedonia, Montenegro and Serbia); Limmud France – Limmud Paris, Limmud Marseille; Limmud Germany – Limmud Berlin, Limmud Cologne, Limmud Essen, Limmud Frankfurt A.M, Limmud Freiburg, Limmud Hamburg, Limmud Munich; Limmud Helsinki; Limmud Hungary; Limmud Italia – Limmud Italia in Jerusalem; Limmud Keshet, Bulgaria; Limmud Latvia; Limmud Lithuania; Limmoed Netherlands; Limmud Oresund (covers Copenhagen, Lund and Malmo); Limmud Poland – Limmud Wrocław; Spain – Limmud Barcelona, Limmud Madrid, Limmud Mallorca; Limmud Stockholm; Limmud Turkey; Limmud Vienna

Israel

Limmud Arava; Limmud Galil; Limmud Golan; Limmud Haifa; Limmud Jerusalem; Limmud Modi'in; Limmud Tel Aviv;Limmud Yeroham

FSU

Limmud FSU Belarus; Limmud FSU Canada; Limmud FSU Europe; Limmud FSU Israel; Limmud FSU Moldova;Limmud FSU Moscow; Limmud FSU NY; Limmud FSU St Petersburg; Limmud FSU Ukraine; Limmud FSU Volga-Urals; Limmud FSU West Coast

Events based upon the Limmud concept

Russia: Lsaran
Switzerland: Jom Ijun
United Kingdom: British Islam Conference
United States: Tidewater Yom Limmud, Jewish Community Day of Learning Naples Other international Limmud entities:

Chair of Limmud North America

2017–2019 Shep Rosenman

2019–2021 Faye Rosenberg-Cohen, Sivie Twersky

2021– Tony Abrams

Chair of Limmud Israel

2018–2020 Danielle Nagler

2021– Eli Ovits

Chair of Limmud FSU (Former Soviet Union)

2006– Chaim Chesler, Sandy Kahn

== Relationships with Orthodoxy in Britain ==
The former London United Synagogue Beth Din's Head Dayan (rabbinic judge), Chanoch Ehrentreu, advised Orthodox rabbis not to attend Limmud Conference. However, in the UK many United Synagogue pulpit rabbis have attended Limmud. In December 2010 Rabbi Yitzchak Schochet of Mill Hill United Synagogue, who had been seen as a notable absentee and critic of Limmud, attended, took part in and taught at Limmud's 30th annual Conference. Following this he wrote on the synagogue's website: "upon return all I could ask myself was, 'where was I until now?'"

Jonathan Sacks did not attend Limmud whilst being Chief Rabbi but attended when he was the head of Jews College. Sacks, when looking back on his rabbinate, considered Limmud to be one of the great successes of his time.

Controversy erupted again in 2013 when newly elected Chief Rabbi Ephraim Mirvis announced his decision to attend. Subsequently, a public notice signed by seven leading Orthodox rabbis including Dayan Chanoch Ehrentreu and Rabbi Avrohom Gurwicz was published in the Jewish Tribune, highly critical of pluralism and urging "God-fearing Jews" not to participate in Limmud. This sparked condemnation by non-Charedi communal leaders, with Jewish Leadership Council chairman Mick Davis, Board of Deputies president Vivian Wineman and United Synagogue president Stephen Pack writing to The Jewish Chronicle, describing the statement as showing "a shocking failure of leadership". The Jewish Chronicle itself described the statement as "crass, ill-judged and ultimately self-defeating". Mirvis's attendance at the 2013 Limmud Conference was well received by fellow participants. At least nine other United Synagogue rabbis also attended the event.

== See also ==
- Clive Lawton
- Limmud FSU
- Limmud International
- Limmud South Africa
