= Lael Bethlehem =

South African civil servant

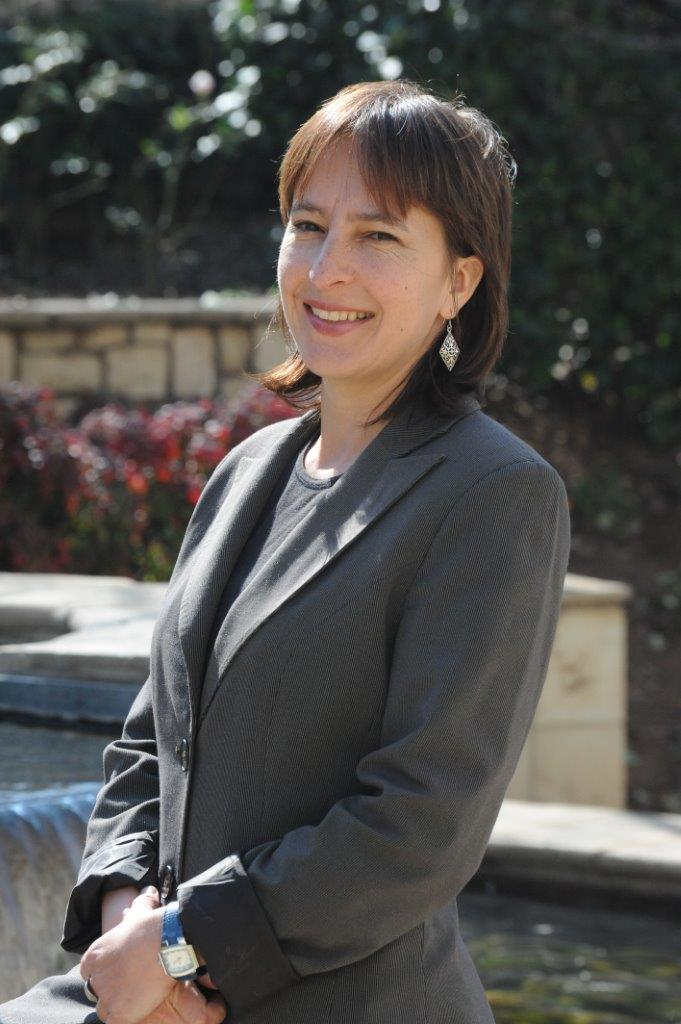

Chief Executive Officer, Johannesburg Development Agency
- In office 2005–2010

Director of Economic Development, City of Johannesburg
- In office 2002–2005

Chief Director of Forestry, Department of Water Affairs and Forestry (South Africa)

Personal details
- Born: 24 October 1967 (age 58) South Africa
- Education: King David Schools, Victory Park
- Alma mater: University of the Witwatersrand
- Occupation: Urban development expert, Investment executive

Lael Bethlehem (born 24 October 1967) is an expert in urban development. She was director of economic development at the City of Johannesburg from 2002 to 2005 and chief executive of the Johannesburg Development Agency from 2005 to 2010. Prior to those roles, she also served as Chief Director of Forestry at the South African National Department of Water Affairs and Forestry, where she led South Africa’s forestry programme and represented the country in international forestry negotiations. Today, Bethlehem is an investment executive at Hosken Consolidated Investments.

== Early life and education ==
Lael Bethlehem was born on 24 October 1967 in South Africa to Jewish parents, Brian Bethlehem, an anaesthetist and Marlene, former president of the South African Jewish Board of Deputies. She is one of three children.

She attended King David, Victory Park, a Jewish day school and matriculated in 1985.

Bethlehem's calling as a civic leader was apparent from an early age: at 11, she won her first award for good citizenship and later became a junior councillor. She attended the University of Witwatersrand in Johannesburg, obtaining a bachelor's degree in 1991 and a Masters in Industrial Sociology in 1994.

== Career ==
Her career began with several research roles within the trade union movement, following which she became chief director at the South African National Department of Water Affairs and Forestry. She worked at the Forestry Department until 2002 when she entered local government in Johannesburg as director of the Department for Economic Development.

=== The Johannesburg Development Agency ===
After three years in the Department for Economic Development, Lael Bethlehem was appointed the CEO of the Johannesburg Development Agency (JDA) in 2005. The JDA was established in April 2001 by the City of Johannesburg and was tasked primarily with inner city regeneration. For five years the agency focussed predominantly on high-profile one-off investments which were aimed at catalysing regeneration in the inner city. Investment projects championed during this time included the Nelson Mandela Bridge, Mary Fitzgerald Square, and the Newtown development. These investments were instrumental in reversing the decline of inner city Johannesburg and in building a community of supporters and investors.

Under Bethlehem's leadership, the JDA moved into a new investment phase, characterised by a series of more sustained smaller scale initiatives aimed at encouraging private sector investment. The agency's work focused on upgrading public space and improving the sense of place in the city – for example public lighting, pavements, urban squares, parks and community halls were created, replaced or improved. A new museum, library, public buildings, trader markets, dance studio and cricket oval were created. The installation of beautiful public artwork and unusual street furniture became a hallmark of the JDA's work. Bethlehem emerged as an advocate of the creation of a liveable city, believing this to be more important than simple ‘upgrading’ of space. “Public spaces have to become attractive places that give a city an identity that people can be proud of” she said in a 2008 interview. Bethlehem also managed several of the city's large scale investment projects during her time as CEO of the JDA, including the development of the infrastructure for the city's bus rapid transit system, known as Rea Vaya, and the preparation of the key precincts for the 2010 FIFA World Cup.

==== Rea Vaya ====
As CEO of the Johannesburg Development Agency, Bethlehem was responsible for developing the infrastructure for the introduction of Rea Vaya, a bus rapid transit system for the city. This R3.5-billion flagship project was a social initiative as well as an infrastructure and environmental project: designed to be accessible, affordable and attractive to residents of all races and classes, the scheme sought to promote social inclusion and counteract the physical and social isolation suffered by the city's poorest communities, particularly in and around Soweto. It was deliberately complementary to and integrated with the Gauteng provincial government's Gautrain.

A 2013 peer review of Rea Vaya concluded that it was too early to determine the system's impact on social equality. The first phase of the scheme was completed on time for the city's hosting of the 2010 World Cup. Rea Vaya currently has around 71,000 passengers per day, and it is estimated will to save 1.6 million tons of CO_{2} equivalent emissions by 2020. Several other South African cities are now planning BRT systems. On leaving the JDA in 2010, Bethlehem picked Rea Vaya as the major scheme she was most proud of – particularly because of the role it played in the process of democratization in the city.

=== 2010 FIFA World Cup ===
The JDA was involved in several major urban development projects which were accelerated by the World Cup deadline – the most significant of which were the upgrades to Ellis Park and Nasrec precincts in which new outdoor artwork and street furniture were installed, new bridges and roads constructed and new cricket and football pitches built. The JDA also lead the regeneration of Vilakazi Street, one of the most visited sites in Soweto.

== Recognition ==
- In 2009 Lael Bethlehem was nominated by the Businesswomen's Association of South Africa as Business Women of the Year.
- In December 2009, Bethlehem was invited by the OECD to London as part of a panel of experts for a three-day stay to review preparations for the 2012 Olympic Games.
- On leaving the JDA in 2010 Lael Bethlehem received an honorary Halala Award in recognition of her achievements at the agency.

== Personal life ==
Lael Bethlehem is married with two daughters and lives in Johannesburg.

She is a member of Temple Israel in Hillbrow, where she is actively involved, through leading services and teaching Hebrew and Jewish studies.

Her uncle, Ronnie Bethlehem, was a leading economist in the country. In 1997, He was shot dead in a hijacking, reversing into his home in Bramley.

== Current roles ==
- Investment executive at Hosken Consolidated Investments
- Non-executive director of The Industrial Development Corporation of South Africa, where she chairs the investment committee

== Previous roles ==
- Board member of UK-based International Institute for Environment and Development
- Board member of the Indonesia-based Center for International Forestry Research (CIFOR)
- Board member of Hans Merensky Foundation, Johannesburg.
- Director: real estate investments, South Africa, Standard Bank of South Africa

== Publications ==
- Bethlehem and Dlomo (2004) Forests, economics and the development agenda
- Bethlehem (2002) Sustainable Forest Management in South Africa: Government Perspective (The South African Forestry Journal)
- Bethlehem (2000) Bringing Democracy to the Forests: Developments in South Africa's Forestry Policy and Legislation (Department of Water Affairs and Forestry, 2000)
- Bethlehem and Goldblatt (1997) The Bottom Line: Industry and Environment in South Africa
- Bethlehem (1997) Labour, Industry and the Environment
- Bethlehem (1997) Catalysing change: International environmental pressures on South African exporters
- Bethlehem et al. (1997) Unions and environment: Life, health and the pursuit of employment
- Bethlehem (1994) An industrial strategy for the Pulp and Paper Sector
- Toolo and Bethlehem (1994) Migration to South Africa: Problems, Issues and Possible Approaches for Organised Labour
- Bethlehem (1992) Race, gender and academic staff: Is affirmative action necessary in South African universities
