= Ronni Kahn =

Australian social entrepreneur

Ronni Kahn AO
- רוני קאהן
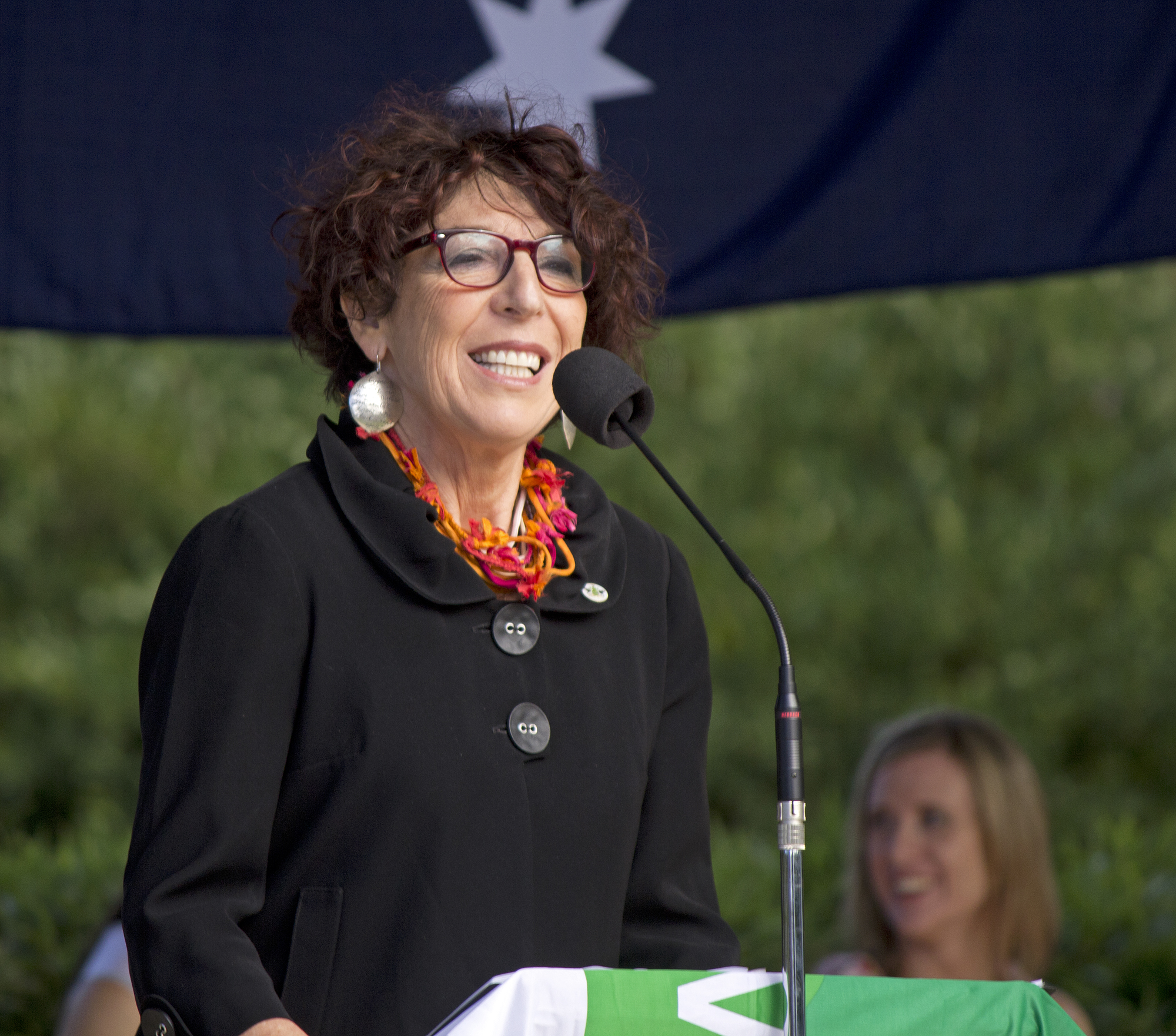
- Kahn at the 2012 Australia Day ceremony in Wagga Wagga
- Born: Ronni Hellmann; 1952; Johannesburg, Union of South Africa
- Occupation: Social entrepreneur
- Known for: Founder of OzHarvest
- Spouses: Des Kahn (m. 1972; div. 1999); Irving Wallach (m. 2005)
- Children: 2

Ronni Kahn (Hebrew: רוני קאהן; née Hellmann; born 1952) AO is a South African-born Australian social entrepreneur, best known for founding the food rescue charity OzHarvest.

Kahn, who emigrated to Australia from Israel in 1988, was awarded the Local Hero Award in 2010, as part of the Australian of the Year awards. In 2019, she was made an Officer of the Order of Australia (AO).

As of 2024, her organisation had delivered over 250 million meals in Australia. In 2019, Kahn initiated a sister organisation, SA Harvest, in her native South Africa.

== Early life and education ==
Ronni Kahn was born and raised in Johannesburg in South Africa to Jewish parents, Abe Hellmann and his wife, Sylvia Hellmann (née Papilsky). Her father was an architect and she attended King David School, a private Jewish Day School in Linksfield. Growing up, she lived next door to the activist Jules Browde and his wife, Selma, who were a source of inspiration for Kahn and later life-long friends of hers. Their children were also Kahn's playmates. She met her future husband when they both attended the socialist-Zionist youth movement, Habonim Dror.

In 1970, during her undergraduate studies in South Africa, she was awarded a scholarship to study in Israel. She subsequently graduated with a BA in Fine Arts and English from the University of Haifa. She lived on a kibbutz in the Jezreel Valley, where she was joined by her husband.

== Career ==
Kahn immigrated to Australia in 1988, and started an event management business.

=== Inspiration ===
On a holiday to South Africa, she was galvanised into action by a friend who had helped to bring electricity into the township of Soweto. Kahn recalls that was the moment her life of purpose began; she wanted to do something meaningful for other people. Building on her experience in corporate hospitality, she was shocked by the amount of food waste, although not initially aware of the relationship between food waste and environmental problems.

=== OzHarvest ===
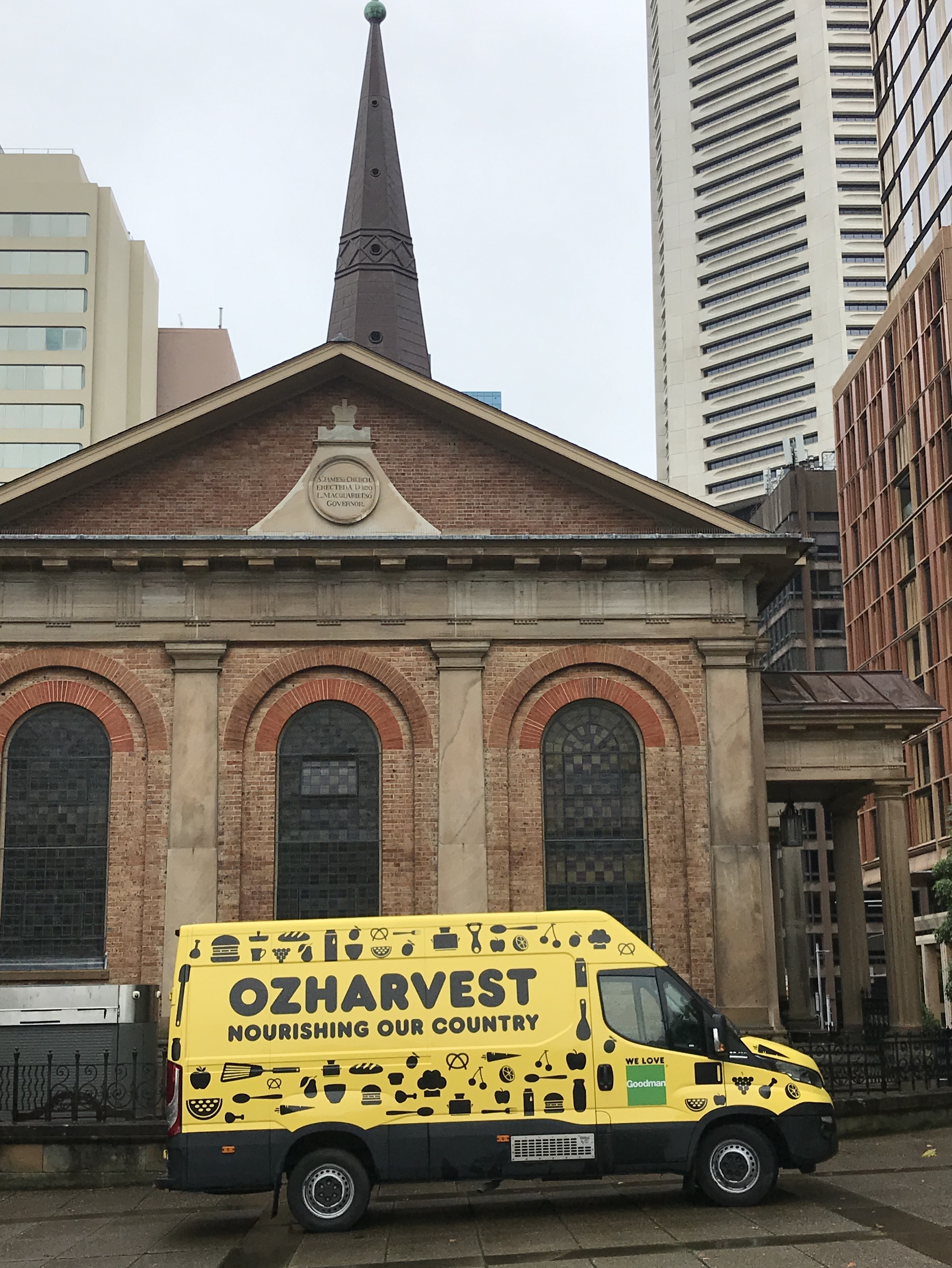
OzHarvest truck delivering food to St James' Church, Sydney supporting the church's Sister Freda Mission

Kahn founded OzHarvest in 2004, initially with the support of people in the restaurant and catering industries in Sydney. It is a non-denominational charity that rescues excess food which would otherwise be discarded and distributes it to charities supporting the vulnerable around Australia. After lobbying for changes to civil liability and health legislation that prevented food donors from supplying excess food, the legislation was changed in four Australian states, starting in New South Wales in 2005. Kahn says OzHarvest "delivers the equivalent of 25 million meals a year that would otherwise be dumped". Kahn was behind the creation of the Nest program – Nutrition, Education & Sustenance Training – which aims to educate vulnerable Australians about nutrition and healthy eating, providing valuable life skills to disadvantaged and marginalised communities.

In her advocacy, Kahn highlights the broader global issues affecting food waste. In 2017 OzHarvest for the fifth year partnered with the United Nations Environment Program (UNEP) on the "Think.Eat.Save" campaign. In December 2014 Ronni attended the Sustainable Innovation Forum in Lima, Peru, as part of the Think.Eat.Save campaign, which was held at the margins of the UNFCCC Climate Change Conference. The event served to remind delegates of the level that food waste contributes to dangerous greenhouse gases, which affect climate change, and the amount of resources squandered when food is wasted.

In 2018, Kahn was looking for a location in Sydney to establish a refettorio in collaboration with Italian chef and restaurateur Massimo Bottura, whom she had met in 2016 and who established a series not-for-profit restaurants that aim “to empower communities to fight food waste through social inclusion”. The plan is for OzHarvest to look after the site, operations, volunteers and supply of rescued food as well as communicate with agencies that supply food to people in need. In 2020, the chosen site for the OzHarvest Refettorio was announced as 481 Crown Street, Sydney.

In 2018, A biographical documentary film about Kahn's crusade to reduce food waste, Food Fighter, was released in 2018. It was produced and directed by Daniel Goldberg over two years and covers Kahn's efforts in Australia, the United Kingdom, South Africa and Thailand.

Since 2019, Kahn has also been involved with SA Harvest, the sister organisation of OzHarvest, in her native South Africa. Kahn sits on the board and appointed her childhood friend, Alan Bowde as CEO. In 2023, the organisation reached a milestone, having delivered over 50 million meals in the country.

In 2022, OzHarvest served its 50 millionth donated meal. In the same year, Kahn was invited to address the National Press Club of Australia.

In October 2024, Queen Camilla visited OzHarvest's restaurant in Surry Hills, with Kahn presenting the Queen with a small silver brooch with a crown.

In November 2024, she was nominated by Marie Claire (Australia) for "Icon of the Year" award with fellow nominees, Nicole Kidman and Emma McKeon.

=== Other activities ===
She lived in Israel for 18 years and is a patron of the Australian branch of the New Israel Fund. In 2012, she and Martin Indyk became the inaugural patrons of branch. In February 2024, Kahn participated in a NIF discussion with Rabbi Jeffrey Kamins at Emanuel Synagogue in Sydney. They spoke about current challenges amid the October 7 attacks and the Gaza war.

== Personal life ==
She married her first husband, Des Kahn, from South Africa's Jewish community, on a kibbutz in Israel in 1972. The couple had two sons together, Nadav (born 1974) and Ido (born 1978). Des served in the Yom Kippur War in 1973, when she was pregnant with Nadav. The couple divorced amicably in 1999.

In 2005, she married Irving Wallach, a Sydney barrister.

In 2023, Kahn was visiting family in Israel during the October 7 attacks. She condemned the attacks: “No political situation can justify this slaughter and torture and terrorism.”

=== Memoir ===
Kahn's memoir, titled A Repurposed Life, was released in 2020.

== Awards ==
Ronni Kahn has been acknowledged as a leader in the fields of entrepreneurship, social impact and innovation. Her contributions have been widely recognised through numerous awards including:

- 2010 Australia's Local Hero, Australian of the Year Awards, in recognition of her work founding OzHarvest.
- 2010 Enriched List, American Express
- 2011 InStyle Woman of Style Award - Community /Charity category
- 2012 Veuve Clicquot Award Business Woman Tribute Award for Innovation, Entrepreneurial Skill and Contribution to the Community
- 2012 Ernst & Young Social Entrepreneur of the Year
- 2017 BOSS magazine Top 21 True Leaders
- 2017 Gourmet Traveller Outstanding Contribution to Hospitality
- 2017 Griffith University Doctor of the University (honoris causa)
- 2018 The Australian Financial Review 100 Women of Influence award for social enterprise and not-for-profit
- 2019 Officer of the Order of Australia (AO). For distinguished service to social welfare, particularly through the development and delivery of innovative programs.

== See also ==
- List of Australian Local Hero Award recipients
- Waste management in Australia
