= King David School =

King David School(s) can refer to one or more of the following Jewish day schools:

Australia

- King David School, Melbourne

Canada

- King David School, Vancouver

England

- King David School, Birmingham
- King David School, Liverpool
- King David High School, Manchester

South Africa

- King David Schools, Johannesburg
