= Etienne Mureinik =

South African legal scholar

- Born: January 1954
- Died: 10 July 1996 (aged 42); Braamfontein, Johannesburg
- Education: King David School, Linksfield
- Alma mater: University of the Witwatersrand; Balliol College, Oxford
- Employer: University of the Witwatersrand
- Known for: Scholarship on South African constitutional law

Etienne Mureinik (January 1954 – 10 July 1996) was a South African lawyer and legal scholar. He was an expert on administrative law and constitutional law. A professor at the University of the Witwatersrand, he was formerly the dean of the university's law school from 1991 to 1992.

== Life and education ==
Mureinik was born in January 1954 and matriculated at King David High School in Linksfield, Johannesburg in 1970. He was the Southern Transvaal school chess champion in the in 1969.

He attended the University of the Witwatersrand (Wits), where he completed a Bachelor of Science, majoring in computer science. His first job was as a computer programmer and systems analyst, but, while working, he enrolled in a Bachelor of Laws by correspondence at the University of South Africa. He ultimately returned to Wits to complete his law degree, and he graduated in 1977 with the bar's annual award for the most distinguished LLB graduate.

== Career ==
=== Wits faculty ===
Professor John Dugard recruited Mureinik to the Wits Law School's staff as a lecturer in February 1978, immediately after his graduation. He taught there for the rest of his life, though he moved briefly to England in 1980 to complete a BCL at Balliol College, Oxford, funded by a British Council Scholarship. Upon his return to South Africa, Wits promoted him to senior lecturer in 1982, to associate professor in 1986, and to professor in 1987. He taught varied areas of law, including labour law and contract law, but specialised in constitutional law and administrative law.

In 1987, he returned to Oxford on a fellowship, concentrating primarily on his research in administrative law, and on his return to South Africa in 1988, he was appointed as chairman of the Wits Law School's Governing Committee. He served as the school's dean for two years from 1991 to 1992, and thereafter returned to his position as a professor. In 1995, he additionally spent half a year as a visiting professor at the Notre Dame School of Law. Upon his return to Wits, he was one of a group of academics who entered into a public spat with Deputy Vice-Chancellor William Makgoba.

=== Constitutional negotiations ===
As an expert on constitutional law, Mureinik was centrally involved in public debate during the negotiations to end apartheid. Though he did not belong to any political party, he advised the Democratic Party on the negotiations that led to the adoption of the Interim Constitution of 1993 and the final Constitution of 1996. In addition, he represented Wits at the Judicial Service Commission from 1994 onwards and wrote a fortnightly legal column in the Weekly Mail from 1995 to 1996. At the time of his death, he was representing the Association of Law Societies in Constitutional Court of South Africa hearings on Certification of the Constitution of the Republic of South Africa.

== Scholarship ==
Mureinik's most notable work was a 1994 article in the South African Journal on Human Rights, in which he introduced the concept of a "culture of justification" as the foundation of post-apartheid democracy and rule of law. It was highly influential in South African constitutional law. It was also quoted by Justice Laurie Ackermann in S v Makwanyane, one of the Constitutional Court's earliest judgments.

== Personal life and death ==
Mureinik's father was the editor of a South African Jewish newspaper, and his siblings lived in Israel. In 1981 in Oxford, he married Amanda Reichman, a fellow student whom he had known at Wits and who went on to become an advocate.

He had clinical depression and died by suicide on 10 July 1996, jumping from a window in a hotel in Braamfontein, Johannesburg. The Constitutional Court observed a minute's silence in his honour.
