= J. M. Gerald Gordon =

South African architect (1933-2016)

J.M. Gerald Gordon
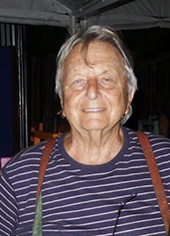
- J. M. Gerald Gordon
- Born: 14 December 1933; Vryheid, South Africa
- Died: 11 September 2016 (aged 82); Johannesburg, South Africa
- Resting place: West Park Cemetery, Johannesburg
- Citizenship: South Africa
- Education: University of Witwatersrand
- Occupations: Architect, Professor of Architecture
- Years active: 1959-2016
- Spouse: Loraine Gordon (d.2020)
- Children: 3
- Buildings: Gordon House, Linksfield Ridge
- Website: jmgeraldgordon.wordpress.com

Joseph Moses Gerald Gordon, PhD (14 December 1933 – 11 September 2016) was a South African architect, Professor (1976–1994) at the University of Witwatersrand School of Architecture, and Honorary Research Fellow of that university (1994-2016). He is best known for inventing the "Thin-Skin" building method. He was a practicing architect from 1959 to 2016.

== Biography ==
Joseph Moses Gerald Gordon was born 14 December 1933 in Vryheid in Natal, South Africa, to Lithuanian Jewish parents. After the family moved to Johannesburg, he attended Athlone Boys' High School in the city. He then studied at the University of Witwatersrand School of Architecture and graduated in 1955. After backpacking through Europe and the Middle East, Gordon settled in London and, while working, studied Law at the London School of Economics. This became useful when, in 1980-1981, he was President of the Transvaal Institute of Architects; Gordon was able to resist what he considered short-sighted or invalid municipal and town-planning restrictions.

In 1976, Gordon returned to South Africa and went back to the University of Witwatersrand, this time as both student and teacher. While teaching design, he also researched architectural history and theory, and debunked some of the fashionable architectural ideas prevalent in Weimar Germany. in 1987, he received his Master's degree (cum laude) for his thesis, Mies van der Rohe: Less is More: More or Less? An Exploration of His Doctrines for the Purpose of Illustrating the Problem of Architectural Pontification. When Gordon's understanding of technology became apparent he was asked to teach Design Using Technology. In 1994, he earned a PhD for his redesign of AutoCAD; his research enhanced the computer-drawing algorithms, and produced a significantly more flexible and powerful design tool.

=== Thin-Skin Construction ===
While teaching, Gordon also introduced the subject "Design Under Cost Constraints". He believed that good design was compatible with any level of affordability, and he was interested in improving design in mass housing and township layout. His low-cost building research resulted in a system called 'Thin-Skin Construction', which is possible for any type of housing. In this system, which Gordon described as "a modernization of 'wattle and daub'", wire-reinforced cement mortar is bound around steel ribbing to form a unified structure which can be used for all building elements, including load-bearing walls, roofs, foundations, and cantilevers. The strength and malleability of the inner steel ribbing allows the architect to design forms and shapes at will, and the mortar encloses a cavity which functions as natural insulation, and as a moisture barrier.

== Works ==
Gordon's papers and drawings are archived at the University of the Witwatersrand School of Architecture & Planning. It is said that he designed hundreds of structures but, as of 2026, there is no online record of his designs and/or projects, other than that of his own house. On the rocky hillside of Linksfield Ridge, a cliff site considered to be unbuildable, he constructed a four-storey home clinging to the rocks and incorporating many of his ideas about alternative technology and building methods. In 2021, the house was commemorated with a Blue Plaque by the Johannesburg Heritage Foundation.

=== Publications ===
(all self-published, free to download)

- From Vernacular to Spectacular: The Way To Build, 2010
- 279 Ways to Use Thin-Skin Construction
- Design Possibilities with Thin-Skin Construction
- Changing the Way To Live in the 21st Century Using Thin-Skin Construction
- Thin-Skin Construction Guide & Complement to Training
- Accessories After the Fact: Furniture & Accessories for Architectural Design
- Homes for the Homeless: Downgrade to Upgrade with Thin-Skin Construction
- The Transformation of Informal Housing Into Permanent Sustainable Settlements, 2004 Conference Paper
