= Greenside High School =

Location
- Greenside, Johannesburg, Gauteng; South Africa; 26°09′07″S 28°01′09″E

Information
- Motto: Individuality through community
- Established: 30 January 1961
- School district: D10
- Principal: Craig Strauss
- Grades: 8–12
- Campus type: Government high school
- Color
- Website: www.greensidehigh.co.za

Greenside High School is a public co-educational high school in Johannesburg, Gauteng, South Africa.

Greenside High School (voted Best Public High School in Joburg) is situated in the suburb of Greenside.

== Facilities ==
Greenside High School increased the size of its swimming pool in 2013/14. The main sport field is used for cricket, rugby, touch rugby, soccer, and athletics. Their hockey fields, which run adjacent to Parkview Golf Club, are mainly used for hockey, but have also been used for cricket, soccer and rugby. Greenside has four basketball courts which also double up as netball courts. There are eight tennis courts.

== Extra-curricular activities ==
The school competes in RAPS, FEDA, EADS, and (as of 2017) GRADS. In 2013, students launched a production of Fame.

In 2017, students from the Greenside High School robotics team traveled to Costa Rica to take part in the WRO Global Robotics Tournament. Greenside High School was the only public school from South Africa to represent the country in this tournament.

== Notable alumni ==
- Jani Allan, columnist
- Matthew Buckland, Internet entrepreneur
- Alistair Cragg, international track and field athlete
- Candîce Hillebrand, actress and singer-songwriter
- Claire Johnston, lead singer of Mango Groove
- Ralph Lazar, writer/artist
- Bonnie Mbuli, television host and actress
- Nefisa Mkhabela, actress and Influencer
- Mmabatho Montsho, actress
- Lesego Semenya, celebrity chef
- James Small, rugby
- Jonathan Wacks, director

== See also ==
- List of high schools in South Africa
