= David Bilchitz =

South African academic (born 1975)

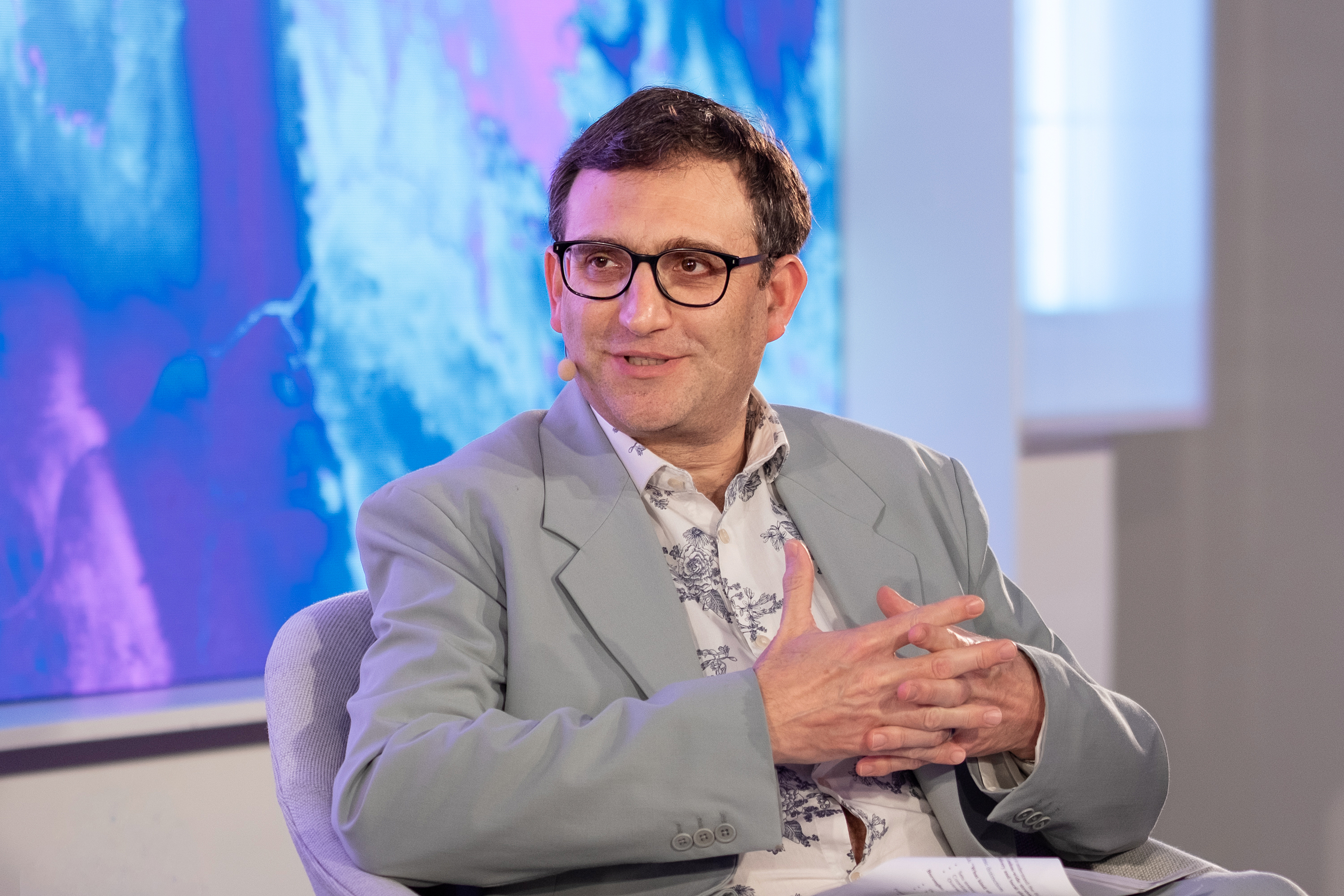
- David Bilchitz at SXSW London 2026
- Born: David Israel Bilchitz; 9 September 1975 (age 51); Johannesburg, South Africa
- Occupation: Professor at the University of Johannesburg
- Spouse: Ruvi Ziegler (m. 2020)

Academic background
- Education: King David School, Linksfield
- Alma mater: University of the Witwatersrand (BA (Hons), LLB); St John's College, Cambridge (MPhil, PhD)

David Israel Bilchitz (born 9 September 1975) is a South African legal academic known for his work in constitutional law and human rights law. He is Professor of Fundamental Rights and Constitutional Law at the University of Johannesburg, where he has led the South African Institute for Advanced Constitutional, Public, Human Rights and International Law since 2009. He is also a professor of law at the University of Reading. He was an acting judge in the Constitutional Court of South Africa in 2024.

== Early life and education ==
Bilchitz was born on 9 September 1975 in Johannesburg. He attended King David School in Linksfield, Johannesburg, where he matriculated in 1993. Raised in a family that was opposed to apartheid, he later said that his social consciousness was shaped by the recognition of "a moral responsibility to make a contribution to undoing its legacy".

In 1994, he enrolled at the University of the Witwatersrand (Wits), where he completed a BA in 1996, Honours in 1997, and an LLB in 1999. In his final year, he received the Society of Advocates Prize as the best graduating LLB student. After his graduation, he spent 2000 at the Constitutional Court of South Africa, where he was a law clerk to Deputy Judge President Pius Langa. Thereafter he attended the University of Cambridge between 2000 and 2004, completing an MPhil in philosophy in 2001 at St Johns College. In 2004, he completed a PhD in law and political philosophy at the same university.

== Academic career ==
From September to November 2004, Bilchitz was a legal consultant at Ashira Consulting in Johannesburg. Thereafter, between December 2004 and January 2007, he was a candidate attorney at Ross Kriel Attorneys, while also lecturing part-time at Wits; the firm, under Ashira's Ross Kriel, focused on public law. Bilchitz was admitted as an attorney in South Africa in 2007.

Through 2007 and 2008, he continued as a part-time lecturer at Wits while working as a senior researcher at the University of Johannesburg's South African Institute for Advanced Constitutional, Public, Human Rights and International Law (SAIFAC). In 2009, he left his position at Wits to become SAIFAC's director, a position he still held as of 2024. He also joined the University of Johannesburg's public law faculty, becoming an associate professor in January 2010 and a full professor in December 2012. As of 2024, he was the university's Professor of Fundamental Rights and Constitutional Law, and, since July 2020, he has additionally been a part-time professor at the University of Reading in Reading, England. He has held fellowships at the University of Sydney in 2009 and the Alexander von Humboldt Foundation in 2016, and he has been a visiting professor at the National University of Singapore, the Humboldt University of Berlin, and the Tel Aviv University.

=== Scholarship ===
The National Research Foundation has twice (in 2012 and 2019) given Bilchitz a B1 rating for internationally acclaimed research on human rights and constitutionalism. In addition to co-editing five collections, he has published two monographs: The Justification and Enforcement of Socio-Economic Rights in 2007, on socioeconomic rights, and Fundamental Rights and the Legal Obligations of Business in 2021, on corporate obligations with respect to fundamental rights.

=== Other academic activities ===
In tandem with his research, from 2011 to 2023, Bilchitz was a member of the South African Law Reform Commission's Advisory Committee on the Law Relating to Witchcraft, and he was appointed to the boards of the Constitutional Court Trust and Animal Law Reform South Africa in 2015 and 2017 respectively. In 2020, he was appointed as the managing editor of the Constitutional Court Review.

Internationally, he has been the vice-president of the International Association of Constitutional Law since June 2020, having formerly served as the organisation's secretary-general from 2013 to 2020. In 2022 he was shortlisted for possible appointment as the African representative to the United Nations Working Group on Business and Human Rights.

== Constitutional Court ==
In October 2023, President Cyril Ramaphosa announced that Bilchitz had been appointed to serve as an acting judge of the Constitutional Court between 1 February and 31 March 2024. Two years earlier, Bilchitz himself had argued publicly that academics should be directly appointed to the court in this fashion. During his service in the court, he dissented from the majority's order of dismissal in Rivonia Circle v President of SA.

Meanwhile, Bilchitz became one of five candidates shortlisted for possible permanent appointment to the Constitutional Court, the others being Matthew Chaskalson, Alan Dodson, Tati Makgoka, and Ashton Schippers. He was the first legal academic to be shortlisted in several years, and Judges Matter suggested that his limited experience – both as a judge and as a practising lawyer – might disadvantage him. During his nomination interview on 8 April 2024, members of the Judicial Service Commission likewise pressed Bilchitz on his inexperience, until Chief Justice Raymond Zondo intervened to point out that Bilchitz had been "minding [his] own business" in academia until Zondo asked him to accept the acting appointment. In his interview, Bilchitz was also asked about socioeconomic rights and his views on the Israel–Palestine conflict, in particular in connection with criticism of the Boycott, Divestment and Sanctions movement that Bilchitz had published in the South African Jewish Report in 2019. After the interviews, the Judicial Service Commission announced that it would not make a recommendation and instead would opt to re-advertise the vacancies.

== Personal life ==
A practicing Jew, Bilchitz is a member of the Beit Emanuel Progressive Synagogue, where he was vice-chairperson from 2013 to 2014, and he was the chairperson of the steering group of Limmud International from 2014 to 2016. Judges Matter described him as a "'militant' vegan" and "one of the pioneers of the 'animal law' movement in South Africa".

Bilchitz is also gay, and he was formerly the chairperson of Jewish OutLook: SA Jewish LGBTI Alliance. His husband is British–Israeli legal academic Ruvi Ziegler, whom he met at the World Congress of Constitutional Law in Seoul, Korea; they married on 16 February 2020.

In the 1990s he was invited by Reeva Forman to be the lay rabbi for the Temple Israel congregation in Hillbrow.

== Honours ==
Bilchitz was elected to the Academy of Science of South Africa in 2020, having been a member of the South African Young Academy of Science since 2015. He was one of the Mail & Guardian's 200 Young South Africans in 2010.
