= Limmud South Africa =

Limmud South Africa is the South African chapter of Limmud UK. Its mission is "to allow each Jew to take one step further on their Jewish journey" and holds annual conferences in Cape Town, Johannesburg and Durban. It aims to be a diverse and inclusive forum where delegates can experience the full gamut of Jewish opinion and belief and often includes sessions on philosophy, religion, history, culture, politics, dance, music, and literature.

== Origins ==
Limmud South Africa was the brainchild of Vivienne Anstey and David Bilchitz.

== The Orthodox Rabbinate's response to Limmud SA ==
The Orthodox rabbis in South Africa do not participate in Limmud's conferences, unlike the UK's Orthodox Rabbinate of whom some members have taken part in Limmud UK. No official statement has been issued.

== Conferences ==
The annual Limmud SA conferences are held in August/September each year. International guests are invited, and many local academics and lay community members participate.

=== 2011 Conference ===
International guests included Michelle Citrin, David Newman, Micha Odenheimer, Barbara Spectre, Kay Andrews, Gerald Steinberg, Rabbi Natan Lopes Cardozo, Eva Hoffman, Gideon Kunda, Rabbi Simon Jacobson, Deborah Weissman, Philip Spectre and Yariv Oppenheimer.

The Johannesburg conference changed its format to a residential conference (like Cape Town) and was held at the Southern Sun Riverside Lifestyle Resort. Cape Town's conference was at Protea Techno Park, Stellenbosch, and Durban's was at the Durban Jewish Centre.

=== 2010 Conference ===
International guests included Noam Sachs Zion, Rabbi Gideon Sylvester, David Shneer, Morey Schwartz, DJ Schneeweiss, Inon Schenker, Benjamin Pogrund, Elad Orian, Sarit Michaeli, Ruth Messinger, David Levin-Kruss, Amy Jill Levin, Gilad Kariv, Jessica Jacoby, Jay Geller, Libby Lenkinski Friedlander, Richard Freund, Jonathan Fine, and Gregg Drinkwater.

The Cape Town venue was Protea Techno Park, Stellenbosch, in Johannesburg, Varsity College Sandton, and in Durban, the Durban Jewish Centre.

=== 2009 Conference ===
International guests included biblical scholar Avivah Zornberg, Lieutenant Colonel David Benjamin, Anat Hoffman, Nobel prize winner Professor Yisrael Aumann, Shlomy Zachary, Mark Weitzman, Joel Stern and others. 450 delegates attended the Cape Town conference (at Gudini Spa), over 800 in Johannesburg (Wits Medical School) and 200 in Durban (Durban Jewish Centre)

Just before the Cape Town conference, respected human rights activist Zackie Achmat called for Limmud to withdraw their invitation to Lt Cnl David Benjamin, accusing him of orchestrating war crimes in Israel's war on Gaza in early 2009 during Operation Cast Lead. Limmud rejected the calls, and David Benjamin did indeed participate in all three of Limmud's conferences. Several protests ensued, and ultimately an independent review by Advocate Geoff Budlender was commissioned. He found that although there had not been a policy of "racial profiling" there were instances of differential treatment based on race.

=== 2008 Conference ===
International guests included Devorah Baum, Rabbi Yehoshua Engelman, Gershom Gorenberg, Simon Gurevichius, Avraham Infeld, Bente Kahan, Maureen Kendler, Taylor Krauss, Karyn Moshal, Amir Tausinger, and Limor Yehuda.

1200 delegates attended conferences in Cape Town (over 300), Johannesburg (700) and Durban.

=== 2007 Conference ===
International guests included Nathan Aviezer, Mikhael Manekin, Benjamin Pogrund, Bassem Eid and Gila Sacks.
