= King David Schools, Johannesburg =

King David Schools
- Gauteng; South Africa

Information
- Type: Private Jewish day schools
- Established: 1948
- Locale: Suburban
- Exam board: IEB
- Grades: preschool – 12
- Colors: Blue and White

The King David Schools are a network of Jewish day schools in Johannesburg, South Africa, offering nursery through high school education. There are four campuses across Johannesburg: Linksfield, Sandton, Minnie Bersohn (Sandton) and Waverley (Rosebelle Klein Nursery School).; "each school has an atmosphere of its own serving the specific community". The Victory Park campus closed in 2025 as part of a consolidation strategy.

The schools are under the auspices of the South African Board of Jewish Education.

King David aims to deliver "an excellent general education together with the study of Hebrew, Jewish Studies and the living of the Jewish calendar and year cycle" and to produce "graduates who are menschen, confident and equipped to pursue any opportunity they wish to, who are proud of their Jewish heritage and its traditions, who have a love for learning, and a determination to contribute to their society."

The schools write the Independent Examination Board examinations for Matriculation; pass rates are very high, and pupils are often amongst the top-ranked, nationwide. The King Davids also achieve in various cultural activities, and, particularly Linksfield, in sporting activities. Each school is involved in several outreach and charity programs, focused on the Jewish and broader communities, including (matriculation) support and enrichment programs for Schools in Alexandra and Soweto. Many King David alumni are noted for their achievements, in South Africa and internationally – see Links below.

Although only a small minority of the pupils are observant – Johannesburg has several Religious day schools – the schools are (nominally) Orthodox. Practically, no school activities take place on Shabbat or on Jewish Holidays, all catering is Kosher, and the school day begins with Shacharit (Morning prayers). Educationally, each school has a Rabbi on staff, Hebrew and/or Jewish Studies are compulsory subjects until Grade 11 (Form IV), and the schools offer a "Beit Midrash stream" – established by Chief Rabbi, Dr. Warren Goldstein – for Grade 10s and 11s who choose this over the regular Jewish Studies classes. The schools are also served by "the DIJE" (Division of Informal Jewish Education), offering programmes which "complement the formal classroom and allow learners to engage with and experience their Judaism". "Encounter", for Grade 11s, is the DIJE's premier educational programme – it aims to "create a domain of conversation in which the participants are able to question, learn about and understand the relevance of Judaism in today's modern world."

An interesting fact is that the two high schools were headed by identical twin brothers, Elliot and Jeffrey Wolf, from the early 1970s through the 1990s; their involvement with the King Davids has continued since retirement, and they have devoted a combined 75 years to the schools.

The King David Schools' Foundation (KDSF) is active in fundraising, with a dual focus on outreach and subsidies/scholarships. Relatedly, it also acts as an alumni association through monthly e-newsletters, reunions and other fundraising events. KDSF was founded in 1994 under the auspices of the SABJE, as a registered non-profit organisation.

== History ==
The Linksfield campus, in northeastern Johannesburg, was established in 1948 as South Africa's first Jewish day school (the high school was founded in 1955); see further under History of the Jews in South Africa. Many of the original buildings of the high school from 1948 still exist on the campus. As a relatively large school, King David Linksfield fields strong teams in several sports. The Sandton campus, a primary school, is the most recently established (1982), and feeds into both high schools. Each campus also has its own nursery school.

=== Sachs House ===
In 1966, Sachs House, a hostel was opened on the school grounds of the Linksfield campus. It was established at the behest of Louis Sachs, one of the original founders of King David. It served Jewish children from rural areas that otherwise would have been unable to commute daily to Johannesburg and would have been denied a Jewish education. The hostel housed up to 150 students at its peak, with student coming from areas such as Bethal, Davel in Mpumalanga, but also students from urban areas such as Bloemfontein, Port Elizabeth, Vereeniging and Carletonville. Amid tensions in Rhodesia, a group of Rhodesian Jewish students were housed at the hostel. Jewish children also came from other parts of Africa as Tanzania and the Belgian Congo. The school was also a refuge for students that had experienced antisemitism at non-Jewish schools in other parts of South Africa. The hostel closed in 1996 after thirty years due to a low occupancy rate. The Jewish rural population had largely declined and reestablished in urban areas and Jewish farming families had purchased family homes in the larger cities.

The hostel was then repurposed by King David Linksfield as small classrooms, with a computer laboratory and media centre later established. The interior walls were later removed and 14 modern classrooms created, while the dining room became an indoor gym.

=== King David Victory Park ===
In 1960, King David Primary School Victory Park opened on the site of a former peach farm in Victory Park. It was responding to a local need as there was a significant Jewish population residing in Victory Park, Emmarentia and Greenside. In 1964, King David High School Victory Park was established and led by Eddie Tannenbaum, vice-principal at King David Linksfield.

Victory Park Hebrew Congregation was later built on the school grounds to serve the school and the local community. The local Jewish community has been perceived to be less traditional than its counterparts in Linksfield and Glenhazel.

In more recent years, enrolment has dwindled as a demographic shift has seen an increasing number of Jewish families relocate to the north of the city, in Sandton and to the east towards Glenhazel and Linksfield. The school closed in December 2025 and the students were given the option to transfer to King David's other campuses. The closure forms part of a long-term strategy aiming to strengthen the King David network and make it sustainable. It is part of a consolidation effort that will see the network operate from a smaller number of schools and campuses.

== Notable alumni ==
=== Linksfield ===
- Danny K (full name Daniel Koppel), singer, songwriter and actor
- Shaun Rubenstein, canoer and Olympian
- Adrian Gore, businessman and entrepreneur, founder and group chief executive of Discovery Limited
- Dan Stein, Professor and Chair of the Dept of Psychiatry and Mental Health at the University of Cape Town
- Gail Louw, playwright
- Larry Cohen, professional footballer
- Jonathan Kaplan, international rugby union referee
- Etienne Mureinik, legal academic
- David Bilchitz, legal academic
- Matthew Chaskalson, a South African lawyer and jurist
- Ronni Kahn, social entrepreneur

=== Victory Park ===
- Akiva Tatz, Orthodox rabbi, inspirational speaker and writer
- Lance Metz, mountain climbers
- Max Price, former vice-chancellor and principal of the University of Cape Town
- Andrew Kuper, founder and CEO of LeapFrog Investments
- Debbie Berman, film and television editor, best known for her work on the Marvel Cinematic Universe.
- Melissa Cohen Biden, a South African-American activist and documentary filmmaker.
- Lael Bethlehem, urbanist, trade unionist

== See also ==
- Jewish education in South Africa
- Jewish day school
- Johannesburg based Jewish day schools:
  - Torah Academy School, Johannesburg
  - Yeshiva College of South Africa
