= Limmud International =

Jewish international educational charity

Limmud International, a section of the Limmud organisation between 2006 and 2016, is a volunteer-led Jewish international organisation, based in London. It was initially chaired by Andrew Gilbert, then by Helena Miller and Uri Berkowitz, by David Hoffman and by David Bilchitz. At the end of 2016, Limmud ceased branding Limmud International as a separate project. In 2021, the UK charity Limmud decided to split off the role of supporting Limmud groups worldwide and so this function is now performed by the Limmud Global Board, which is a separate entity from the UK charity.

Limmud (from Hebrew 'to learn') is a British-Jewish educational charity which produces a large annual winter conference at the Hilton Birmingham Metropole and several other events around the year in the UK on the theme of Jewish learning. Limmud events are organised by volunteers who, as "volunticipants", also take part as equals in the conference. Limmud's largest group of volunteers are in their 20s and 30s.

The Limmud model, first developed in the UK, has now spread to many other countries. Over eighty communities in 43 countries on six continents have active Limmud groups, including, in 2016 for the first time, Bogota, Helsinki, Michigan and Perth. There are 18 Limmud communities in North America and ten in Israel.

Limmud International supports networks of Limmud volunteers in establishing and developing Limmud communities overseas. It provides training, mentoring and support for Limmud groups, and offers a forum for the sharing of ideas and best practices.

== Limmud in North America ==
Limmud arrived in New York in 2005. Limmud events have also been held in Los Angeles, Colorado and Atlanta (2008), Philadelphia (2009), New Orleans, Chicago and Boston (2010), San Francisco Bay Area (2011), Miami (2014), Arizona (2015), Michigan (2016) and in Canada Ottawa (2013), Toronto (2004), Vancouver (2014), Winnipeg (2013) and Montreal. There are also a number of Russian language Limmud groups operating in North America under the Limmud FSU umbrella: Limmud FSU New York started in 2009, Limmud FSU Canada in 2014 and Limmud FSU West Coast in 2016.

=== Limmud Toronto ===
After years of planning by local volunteers, Limmud Toronto was first held on 21 November 2004 at York University. Over 400 participants enjoyed close to 50 sessions, including a Young Limmud programme for children aged 5 to 12. Three years later on 2 December 2007, Limmud Toronto was held at the University of Toronto. Despite coinciding with the first major snowfall of the year, the conference drew nearly 500 participants. Limmud Toronto had its third conference, again at the University of Toronto, on 15 February 2009. After a hiatus, Limmud returned to Toronto in 2015. As of 2016, it is an annual event; the 2016 event was held at St. Andrew's Club and Conference Centre on March 6, and drew over 600 participants to nearly 80 sessions.

== Limmud in Latin America ==
There are now Limmud groups in Buenos Aires, Bogota, Caracas, Costa Rica, Mar del Plata, Mexico, Peru Uruguay.

== Limmud in Asia and Oceania ==
Limmud's first event in China, planned by members of the Beijing and Shanghai Jewish communities, was held in 2012.

Limmud events have been held in Australia (Canberra, Sydney, Melbourne and Perth), China (Beijing, Hong Kong and Shanghai), India and New Zealand.

=== Limmud Oz ===
A delegation from Sydney, Australia came to Limmud's conference in 1996. This led to a Limmud Oz group being formed which launched its first activity in 1999 in Sydney. Later they went into an alternative years format with a biennial gathering in Melbourne. Through a joint venture with Partnership 2000 and Keren Hayesod Australia they have been the impetus for the launch in 2009 of the Limmud Arava programme which replicates the UK relationship with the Northern Galil.

In June 2012, Limmud Oz announced that the following pro-Boycott, Divestment and Sanctions groups would not be allowed to participate: "Vivienne Porzsolt, a spokeswoman for Jews Against the Occupation, who was detained in Israel last year en route to the flotilla to Gaza; Avigail Abarbanel, the editor of Beyond Tribal Loyalties, who renounced her Israeli citizenship in 2001; and Peter Slezak, a co-founder of the far-left advocacy group Independent Australian Jewish Voices." In addition, they are allowing "the president of the Australian Palestinian Advocacy Network, a representative of the Islamic Council of Victoria and a Palestinian academic."

=== Limmud in Israel ===
Limmud in the Galil started through the connection between the British Jewish community and its Partnership 2000 community in the Northern Galil. The first conference was held in 2001. Limmud FSU (for Russian speakers) held its first conference in Ashkelon in 2007, followed by conferences in Jerusalem starting in 2008. Limmud Arava, commencing in 2009, was based on the Galil P2k model and came from the Australian P2k link. Limmud Negev and Limmud Modiin, starting in 2009 and 2010, have been developed in conjunction with Melitz and the local communities.

Limmud Modiin held its first event in June 2010. Limmud Jerusalem held an event on 10 May 2012.

== Limmud in Western Europe ==
Austria: Limmud Wien is an annual and growing tradition in Austria.

Belgium: In Belgium, an annual Conference called HowDoYouJew? has run since 2014, which attracts 600+ participants.

France: Limmud France (Limoud) has held an annual gathering in Paris each November and smaller day events in Lyon and in Paris.

Finland: In 2016, Limud Helsinki was held for the first time.

Germany: Sophie Mahlo, Toby Axelrod and others have organised annual multi-day Limmud festivals since 2008 near Berlin, and they are now helping local teams run one-day events in other cities, including Munich, Cologne/NRW and Frankfurt.

Italy: Limmud Italia has been held in Florence since 2014 and continues to grow in size year after year.

Netherlands: There had been growing numbers coming from the Netherlands to the Limmud conference in the UK such that in 1998 they decided to have a day event in Amsterdam. This was run with the help of the Jewish Welfare Board and was hosted for a number of years. Since 2007 it has been run strictly as a volunteer-run event. In 2010, Limmoed NL ran from Sunday evening to Monday during a holiday-weekend.

Spain: Limud Barcelona held its first event in 2014 organised by a team of over 20 volunteers with nearly 200 participants.

Sweden: Educators from the Hillel school in Stockholm have been coming since the 1980s to Limmud. Rabbi Morton Narrowe, then Chief Rabbi of Stockholm, led a larger group in the early 1990s. In 1994 the community dovetailed a tour with Debbie Friedman and the Kelmans with Limmud in the UK. However it was not until 2008 that Limmud Stockholm launched its first activity.

In Lund, a University town in Southern Sweden, a Limmud Lund launched its first activity in March 2012 ("LundaLimmud"). This evolved into Oresundslimmud, which also included the greater region of Copenhagen and Malmo.

Switzerland: As they decided to pay presenters, they ran a Limmud inspired activity called Yom Iyun in Basle and in more recent years in Zurich.

== Limmud in Central Europe and the former Soviet Union ==
Limmud FSU was created in 2006 by Chaim Chesler and Sandra Cahn. They have co-ordinated a cadre of volunteers who have created major Limmud activities for young Russians in several cities including gatherings in Moscow (2005 & 2010), Ukraine (2007, 2009 & 2010), Israel (2007 & 2010), Birobidzhan (2009), New York (2009 & 2010), and New Jersey (2012 & 2013).

In 2002 Andres Spokoiny, then JDC Baltics Director, who had been to Limmud as a youth worker in 1992, organised a Limmud in the Baltics conference in Vilnius, which gathered over 1,000 people from a Jewish community in the Baltic states (Estonia, Latvia and Lithuania) of less than 20,000.

There are now Limmud groups in Hungary, Romania, Poland, Bulgaria, Romania (Bucharest, Timișoara & Iași), former Yugoslavia (Serbia/Croatia/Macedonia), Russia (Moscow, Saint Petersburg, Kazan, Birobdijan) and Ukraine (Yalta, Lviv and Odesa).

In 2012 more than 400 young Jews from Moldova and the southern region of Ukraine came together in the city of Chișinău, for the first Limmud FSU (former Soviet Union) conference in Moldova.

== Limmud Turkey ==
Limmud started in Turkey in 2005 with the introduction of the project by Lina Filiba from the Turkish Jewish community and with the leadership of Gina Alkash and Tony Hananel working together with an active volunteer steering committee as well as a group of young adult volunteers from the Jewish community in Istanbul. Regularly attracting over 1100 people to their activities, Limmud Turkey takes place once a year in autumn.

== Limmud South Africa ==
Limmud events have been held in South Africa (Johannesburg, Cape Town & Durban).
