= Fairbridges Attorneys =

South African law firm

Fairbridges Attorneys is a South African law firm. The firm, established on 6 November 1812, is one of the oldest law firms in Southern Africa. With offices in Johannesburg and Cape Town, The lawfirm has won the PMR.Africa "Diamond Arrow" award for excellence in the small firm category five times: 2009, 2010, 2011, 2013, 2014.
