= Clive Lawton =

British Jewish educator, broadcaster and writer

Clive Lawton OBE
- Born: 14 July 1951 (age 75); Stoke Newington, London, England
- Education: University of York
- Known for: Limmud

Clive Allen Lawton OBE (born 14 July 1951) is a British Jewish educator, broadcaster and writer who was one of the founders, in 1980, of the educational charity Limmud. He is the former chief executive officer of the Commonwealth Jewish Council, a lecturer at the London School of Jewish Studies, scholar-in-residence at JW3 and Senior Consultant to Limmud. He chaired the panel of judges for the 2020 Wingate Prize.

== Early life and education ==
He was born in Stoke Newington, London on 14 July 1951 to Reginald Samuel Clifford and Regina (Attias) Lawton. He graduated from the University of York in 1973 with a B.A. in English and education and in 1974 with a postgraduate education certificate. Lawton has an M.A. in theatre studies from the Polytechnic of North London, an M.Ed. in religious studies from the University of Liverpool and an M.Sc. in educational management from the University of East London.

== Personal and family life ==
Lawton was married from 1984 to 1992 to Sara Joy Leviten. He has two daughters: Anna and Evie. His daughter, Anna, was co-chair of the 2017 Limmud Festival.

He lives in London.

== Honours ==
In the 2016 New Year Honours he was appointed OBE for his services to the Jewish community, "particularly through Limmud UK".

== Publications ==
- Matza and Bitter Herbs, Hamish Hamilton, 1984, ISBN 978-0241113776
- Passport to Israel, Franklin Watts, 1987, ISBN 978-0531104941
- The Jewish People: Some Questions Answered, Board of Deputies of British Jews, 1996, ISBN 978-0907104148
- The Story of The Holocaust, Franklin Watts, 1999, ISBN 978-0749633318
- My Belief: I Am A Jew, Franklin Watts, 2001, ISBN 978-0749641733
- Auschwitz: The Story of a Nazi Death Camp, Franklin Watts, 2002, ISBN 978-0749644161
- Hiroshima: The Story of the First Atom Bomb, Franklin Watts, 2004, ISBN 978-0749651329
