= Coalition for the Advancement of Jewish Education =

U.S. non-profit organization

The Coalition for the Advancement of Jewish Education (CAJE), founded as the Coalition for Alternatives in Jewish Education, was a non-profit organization based in New York City founded by Jerry Benjamin and Cherie Koller-Fox. . Its activities included an annual conference that drew ~2000 Jewish educators, advocacy for Jewish educators, various education-related publications, and more.

CAJE went bankrupt in the Winter of 2008, in part because of the recession that year that stressed the finances of synagogues and schools who paid for educators to attend and partly because of the financial mismanagement on those running the organization. In 2010, a new organization called NewCAJE arose, led by CAJE's original founders Koller-Fox and Benjamin.

== Leadership ==
CAJE was led by Dr. Elliot Spack, Executive Director for 26 years, a president, and chairpeople. On the West Coast, founders Stuart Kelman, Joel Grishaver, and Ron Wolfson founded the regional branch that made CAJE a national organization.

=== Presidents ===
- Rabbi Dan Syme
- Jerry Benjamin
- Rabbi Cherie Koller-Fox
- Rabbi Stuart Kelman
- Carol Starin
- Betsy Dolgin Katz
- Rabbi Michael Weinberg
- Sylvia Abrams
- Alan Wiener
- Fran Perlman
- Iris Petroff

== Conference ==
CA CAJE's yearly CAJE conference drew between 350 at the first conference and as many as 2,400 Jewish educators from around the world at later conferences..The first conference was held in August 1976 at Brown University. Around 350 people attended. It was sponsored by NETWORK, where Jerry Benjamin was the President. At the end of the conference, the participants voted to have another conference which was held one year later in Rochester, New York where CAJE was officially founded.

Due to its size and nature, the CAJE conference was held on a university campus. There were thousands of volunteers who organized and taught at every conference. The CAJE conference was the model for the Limmud Conferences in England and later around the world.

Unlike other conferences of its size, the CAJE conference typically offered several hundred workshops over the course of only a few days. The workshops were lead for the most part by teachers in the field. The daily workshops were supplemented by evening keynote addresses and performances of the arts including music, storytelling, comedy, dance and art etc.and a choir led by Debbie Friedman. The CAJE definition of teacher included "anyone involved in the transmission of Jewish education and culture;" intended to create a pluralistic organization that included all who worked in Jewish education from any denomination and teaching any age group from birth until adulthood.

Network at the conference created a field of Jewish education and gave support to teachers, both formal and informal; many innovations in Jewish education were spread through the conference to schools around the country and the world. At CAJE 25, CAJE started to advocate for better salaries, higher status, benefits, professional development and other things necessary to create an excellent teaching community to educate Jews living in the diaspora.

In recent years, sub-conferences such as the "Consortium for the Future of the Jewish Family" ran concurrently with the CAJE conference.

After CAJE closed in 2009 following their 2008 bankruptcy, the conference planned for 2009 was canceled on 9 January 2009 via email to all CAJE members. The conference was intended to take place at Trinity University. Instead, a MANAGE conference planned by participants was held at Pearlstone Jewish Retreat Center with 186 participants.

The first NewCAJE conference had 350 attendees, including 75 young professionals.

=== Recent and future locations ===
==== As NewCAJE ====
All past program books for NewCAJE are the NewCAJE Website.

- 2024: San Diego, California
- 2023: Montclair, New Jersey
- 2020-2022: The Summer of NewCAJE online Conferences due to the Pandemic
- 2019: Portland, Oregon
- 2018: Hartford, Connecticut
- 2017: Moraga, California
- 2016: Naperville, Illinois
- 2015: University of Hartford ()
- 2014: Sinai Temple and UCLA Hillel ()
- 2013: Nichols College ()
- 2012: Montclair State University ()
- 2011: American Hebrew Academy ()
- 2010: Gann Academy (NewCAJE 1)

==== As CAJE ====
- 2009: Pearlstone Jewish Retreat Center (MANAGE Conference)
- 2009: Trinity University (CAJE 34) (canceled)
- 2008: University of Vermont (CAJE 33, chaired by Mel Birger-Bray and Joel M. Hoffman)
- 2007: Washington University in St. Louis (CAJE 32, chaired by Peter Eckstein, co-chaired by Iris Schwartz)
- 2006: Duke University (CAJE 31)
- 2005: University of Washington (CAJE 30)
- 2004: Hofstra University (CAJE 29)
- 2003: Ohio State University (CAJE 28)
- 2002: Trinity University (CAJE 27)
- 2001: Colorado State University (CAJE 26)
- 2000: Hofstra University (CAJE 25)
- 1999: Ohio State University (CAJE 24)
- 1998: Trinity University (CAJE 23)
- 1997: Stanford University
- 1996: Hebrew University
- 1995: University of Massachusetts
- 1994: Indiana University
- 1993: Trinity University
- 1992: University of Southern California
- 1991: Hofstra University
- 1990: University of Washington
- 1989: Hebrew University
- 1987: West Georgia College
- 1086: University of Maryland, College Park
- 1985: Northern Illinois University
- 1984: Stanford University
- 1983: Trinity University
- 1982: Brandeis University
- 1981: Oberlin College
- 1980: University of California, Santa Barbara
- 1979: Rutgers University
- 1978: University of California, Irvine
- 1977: Rochester Institute of Technology
- 1976: Brown University

== Highlights of CAJE 33 Aug 10–14 2008 ==
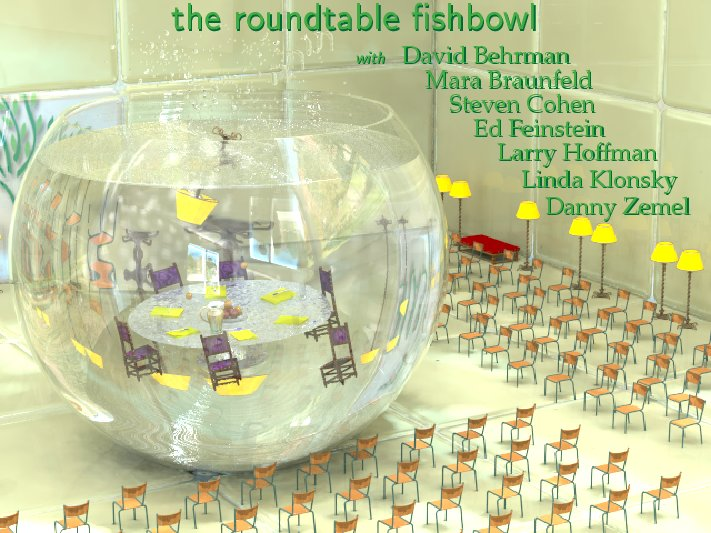
The Roundtable Fishbowl

- The Future of Congregational Education: Evolution & Revolution
- The Roundtable Fishbowl
- Green Judaism: The Moral Imperative to Care for the Earth
- Early Childhood Conference @ CAJE 33: Sharing a Vision --- Early Childhood as the Gateway to Jewish Learning and Living
- Hands-on Technology: Virtual Community, Actual Learning
- Principals' Intensives
- Teachers' Intensives
- National Educators Institute with PANIM: The Institute for Jewish Leadership and Values
