= Greenside, Gauteng =

Suburb in Gauteng, South Africa

Greenside
- Location within Gauteng Location within South Africa
- Coordinates: 26.157°S 28.014°E
- Country: South Africa
- Province: Gauteng
- Municipality: City of Johannesburg
- Main Place: Johannesburg
- Established: 1931

Area
  - Total: 2.75 km^{2} (1.06 sq mi)

Population (2011)
  - Total: 4,889
  - Density: 1,780/km^{2} (4,600/sq mi)

Racial makeup (2011)
  - Black African: 22.0%
  - Coloured: 2.8%
  - Indian/Asian: 17.1%
  - White: 54.6%
  - Other: 3.5%

First languages (2011)
  - English: 68.9%
  - Afrikaans: 12.7%
  - Zulu: 3.8%
  - Tswana: 2.2%
  - Other: 12.3%
- Time zone: UTC+2 (SAST)
- Postal code (street): 2193
- PO box: 2034

Greenside, is a suburb of Johannesburg, South Africa. Greenside borders on the suburbs Emmarentia, Parkview, Parkhurst and Victory Park.

== History ==
Greenside lies on land that once made up the Braamfontein Farm, one of many large farms that makes what is Johannesburg and its suburbs. The farm land was bought in 1886 by Lourens Geldenhuys for its mining rights as it was hoped that the Confidence Reef would extend into his farm but it did not. Land remained as a farm and by 1891 it was divided, along what is now Orange Road, between his son's Frans and Louw where the brothers had already built two farm houses. Louw Geldenhuys died in 1929 and his wife Emmarentia would begin to sell parts of the farm that became the surrounding suburbs, one of which became Greenside on 4 February 1931 and was surveyed by the Rand Mines Group.

Greenside's name is considered to be Scottish in origin, and refers to the adjacent Parkview Golf Club. The golf course has its origins much earlier than the suburb, established in 1916 and modified again in 1930. Most of the roads in Greenside were named after golf courses or professional golfers. Leitch Road was named after the Scottish golfer Charlotte Cecilia Pitcairn Leitch. Quimet Street is named after the America golfer Francis Ouimet - how the confusion arose between the O and the Q is not known - suffice to say that it causes never-ending confusion as to the pronunciation of the street name (should it be pronounced in the French or American style), and for people seeking to locate the street. By 1940, Greenside Primary School had been established and Greenside High School would follow in January 1961. Pirates Club was based in the suburb from 1952 on land donated to the City of Johannesburg by the Sir Lionel Phillips Trust based inside the Sir Lionel Phillips Park, though the club originated elsewhere in 1888.

During the apartheid era, it was classed as a "whites only" area under the terms of the Group Areas Act. Historically, it has been a centre for Johannesburg's Jewish community. In 1971, Jews made up 43.7% of residents. The suburb's Orthodox congregation, Greenside Shul, was consecrated in 1946.

== Areas of interest ==
Greenside has recently become a restaurant centre with about a dozen high-end restaurants, giving it a similar atmosphere to Parkhurst, Norwood and Melville. Other places of interest are:

- Village Green Shopping Centre
- Pirates Sports & Rugby Club
- Sir Lionel Phillips Park
- Parkview Golf Club

== Education ==
- Greenside High School
- Greenside Primary School
- Greenside Design Center College of Design
