= Parkhurst, Gauteng =

Parkhurst
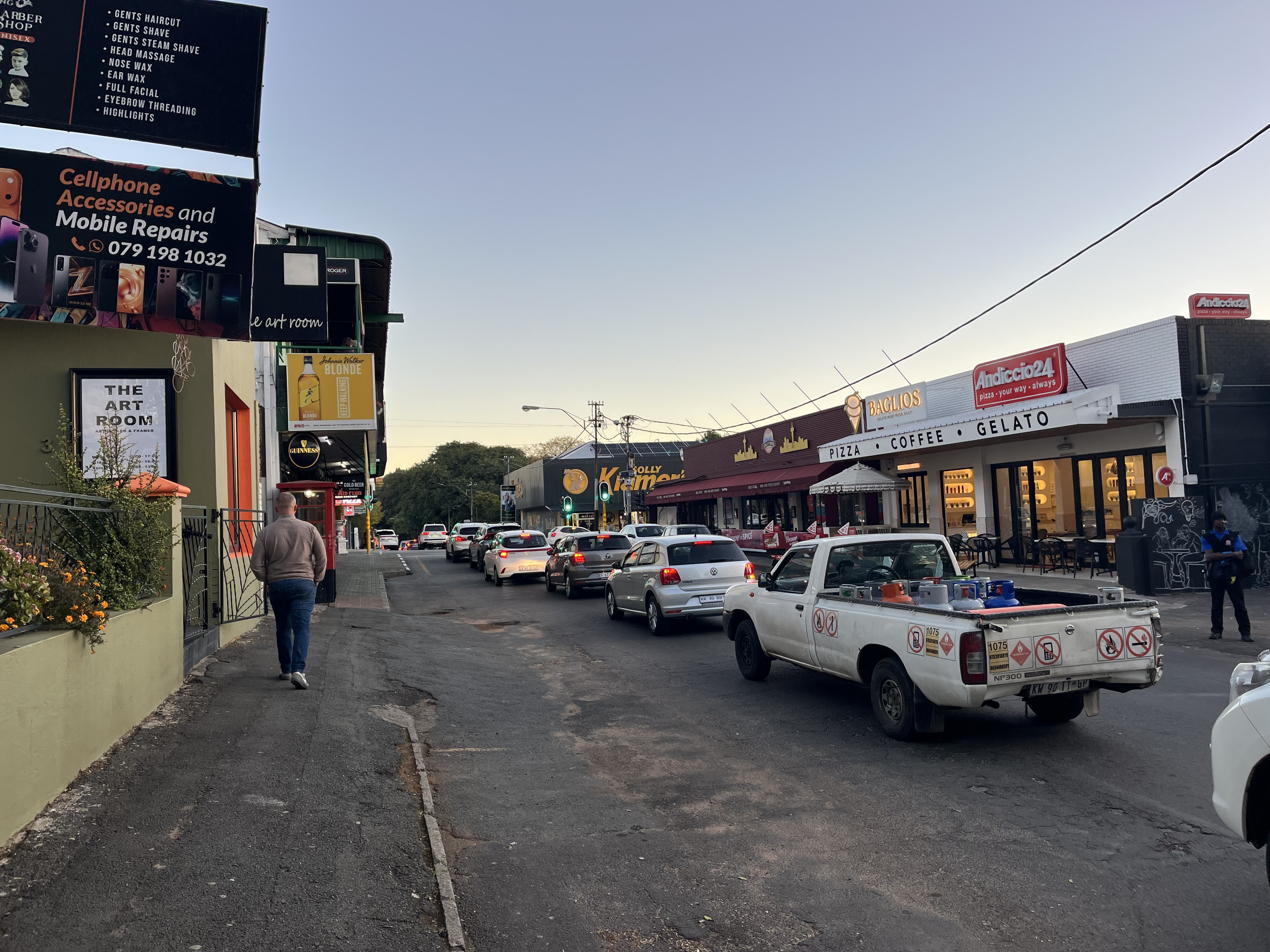

- Location within Gauteng Location within South Africa
- Coordinates: 26°8′18″S 28°1′4″E
- Country: South Africa
- Province: Gauteng
- Municipality: City of Johannesburg
- Main Place: Johannesburg

Area
  - Total: 1.64 km^{2} (0.63 sq mi)

Population (2011)
  - Total: 4,851
  - Density: 2,960/km^{2} (7,660/sq mi)

Racial makeup (2011)
  - Black African: 20.4%
  - Coloured: 1.6%
  - Indian/Asian: 2.5%
  - White: 73.8%
  - Other: 1.7%

First languages (2011)
  - English: 71.0%
  - Afrikaans: 10.1%
  - Zulu: 4.0%
  - Xhosa: 2.1%
  - Other: 12.8%
- Time zone: UTC+2 (SAST)
- Postal code (street): 2193
- PO box: 2120

Parkhurst is a small, dense northern suburb of Johannesburg, Gauteng, of about 2000 households and 4000 residents. Forming part of the northern suburbs, Parkhurst is roughly bounded by Parktown North to the east, the Braamfontein Spruit to the west, Craighall to the north, and Greenside to the south.

Although it is mainly residential, there are two main commercial roads - 4th Avenue which has the restaurants, cafes and décor, design, antique and service shops; and 6th Street which is quickly becoming converted into a design, décor, art and small business area. Parkhurst is one of the city's most walkable districts and popular with residents for its street life and sidewalk cafes, with an atmosphere similar to Greenside and Melville.

== History ==
Parkhurst was founded in 1904 by the African Realty Trust, founded by American born developer, I. W. Schlesinger, who developed Braamfontein farm into 2200 stands. As Parkhurst formed the far northern corner of the farm on the city's edge, Schlesinger decided to have a naming competition as a publicity stunt to bring attention to the area, which lagged behind more desirable areas like Parktown at the time. The competition turned out to the very successful attracting the attention of Lord Milner and by 1906, the suburb became well known throughout the Transvaal Colony as an emerging and desirable area.

About a third of the suburb was developed by the 1930s and it was completely developed after World War II, with most housing dating from this era . The gentrification of the area started in the 1960s when the older houses in the southern section started to be renovated. This process continues to this day with many properties being re-modelled and renovated several times over. There is an active residents' association, the Parkhurst Residents and Business Owners Association (PRABOA), who try to preserve the suburb's village-like atmosphere.

Although erroneously included by Google Maps as part of Randburg, Parkhurst has never been part of that area.

== Amenities ==
Parkhurst is probably best known for its main commercial corridor along 4th Avenue. It is a popular tourist and weekend location for residents across Johannesburg.

4th Avenue (bordering Parkhurst Community Church) has become a small business hub with numerous small businesses opening on the street.

Verity Park is a Parkhurst attraction. The park was originally the home of the Parkhurst Soccer Club, however, the club moved in the 1970s. Adjacent to the park is the Parkhurst Petanque Club, where social games are played at weekends. Verity Park is also known as a dog haven and draws many residents wishing to walk their dogs.

== Community ==
Despite its small size, Parkhurst is considered one of Johannesburg's more desirable suburbs. In 2010, it was ranked number 1 in Johannesburg by the Daily Maverick, citing its proximity to quality schools, dining, nightlife, shopping, location, green space, safety, and creative capital, among other aspects. Being one of the older suburbs in northern Joburg, Parkhurst also feature many historic residences with architecture including, Edwardian, Tudor Revival and Cape Dutch.
