= Rea Vaya =

South African bus rapid transit system

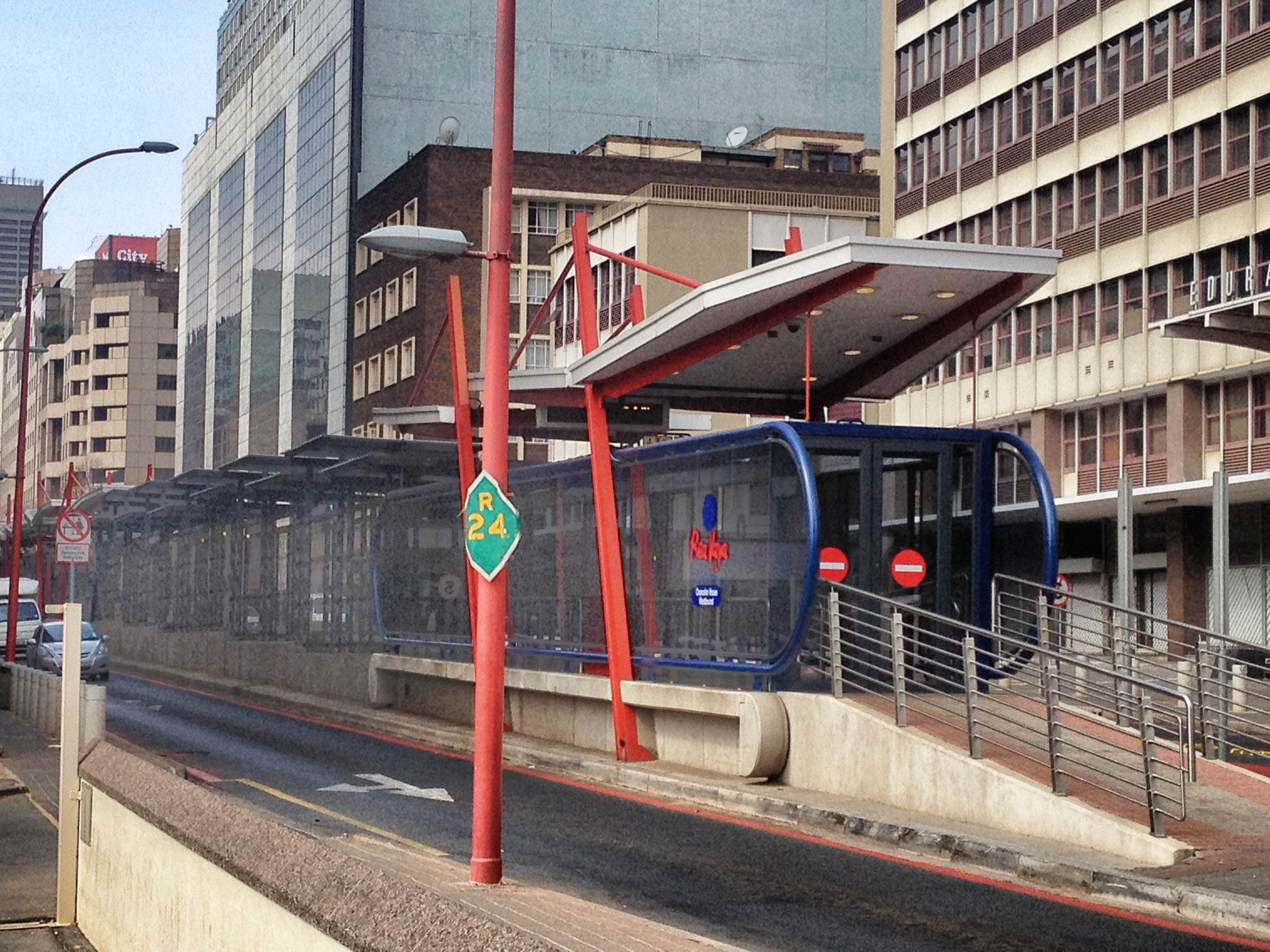
- Rea Vaya bus stop in Johannesburg CBD at the junction of Commissioner Street and Ntemi Piliso Street

Overview
- Owner: City of Johannesburg
- Locale: Johannesburg; Soweto; Sandton
- Stations: 58
- Website: reavaya.org.za

Service
- Type: Bus rapid transit
- Services: 21 routes

History
- Opened: 30 August 2009

Technical
- Line length: 59 km (37 mi)

Rea Vaya (which means "we are going" in Scamto) is a bus rapid transit system operating in Johannesburg, South Africa. It opened in phases starting on 30 August 2009. Rea Vaya links the Johannesburg CBD and Braamfontein with Soweto. Since 2025, it also connects the Johannesburg CBD with Sandton and Alexandra. It is one of the first bus rapid transit systems in Africa.

== Routes ==
Rea Vaya routes are divided into three classifications: trunk routes on the main highways and between major destinations; complementary routes running on circular routes that connect to trunks; and feeder routes that radiate out from trunk routes to outlying suburbs.

As of 2015 the following routes are in operation:

Trunk routes:

- T1: Thokoza Park (Soweto) to Johannesburg CBD and Ellis Park East (Doornfontein)
- T2: Thokoza Park to Ellis Park East via Civic Centre (Braamfontein)
- T3: Thokoza Park to Parktown and Library Gardens East

Complementary routes:

- C1: Dobsonville (Soweto) to CBD and Ellis Park East
- C2: Dobsonville to Maponya Mall
- C3: Inner City Loop - Chancellor House to Johannesburg Art Gallery
- C4: Windsor West and Cresta to Parktown and Inner City
- C5: Florida North to Parktown and Library Gardens
- C6: Meadowlands to Millpark

Feeder routes in Soweto and adjacent areas:

- F1: Naledi to Thokoza Park to CBD
- F2: Protea Glen to Thokoza Park to CBD
- F3: Jabavu to Lake View to CBD
- F4: Mofolo to Boomtown to CBD
- F5: Eldorado Park to Lake View to CBD
- F6: Lea Glen to Bosmont
- F7: Amalgam to Bosmont Station
- F8: Westbury Station to Greymont
- F9: Mapetla to Thokoza Park
- F10: Pimville to Lakeview
- F11: Bellevue/Yeoville to City
- F12: Parktown distribution route

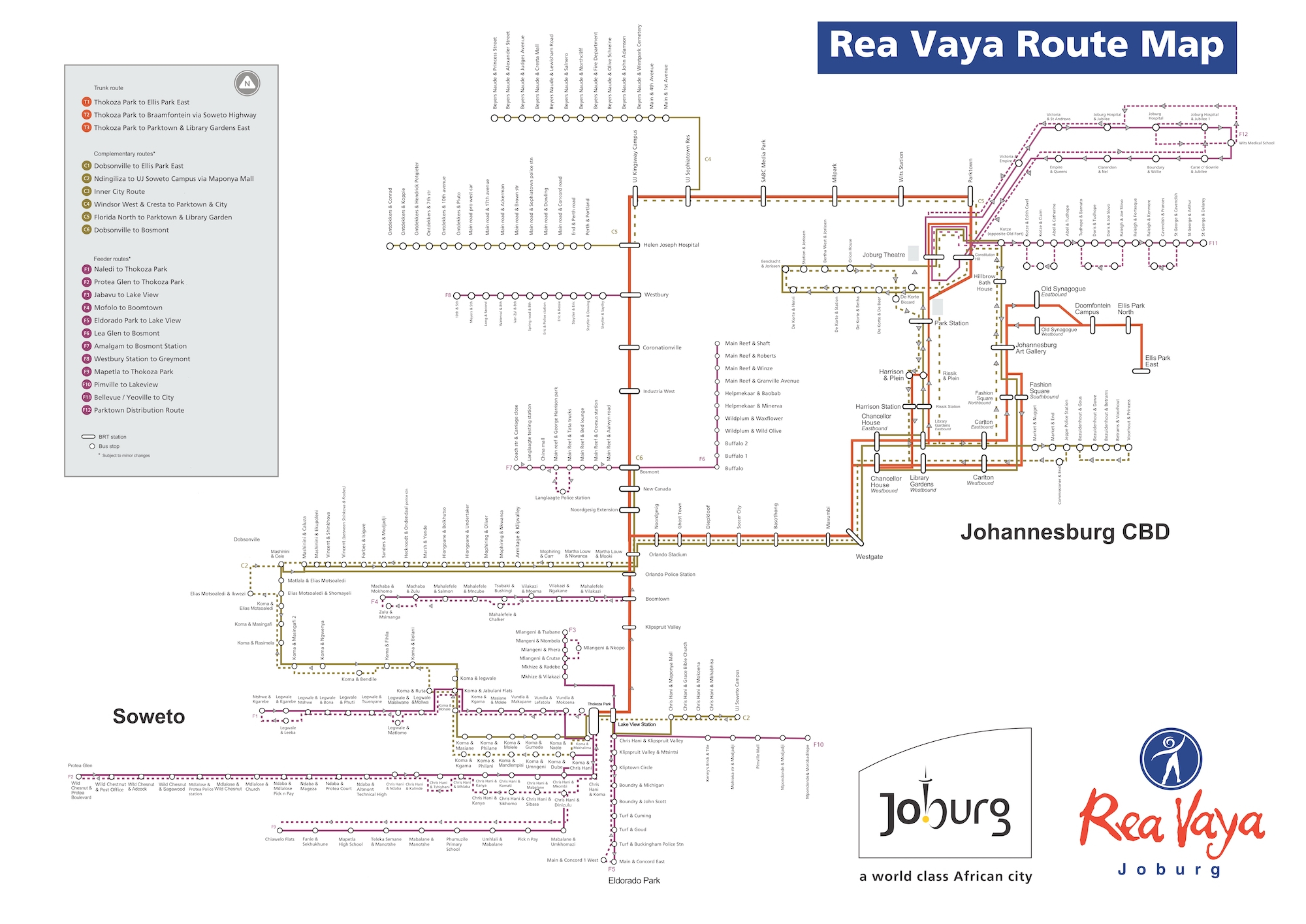
Official Rea Vaya route map as of September 2022

== Strike action ==
As of February 2014, there have been three strikes which have disrupted service of the transit system.
