= Ashton Schippers =

South African judge (born 1958)

The Honourable Ashton Schippers

Judge of the Supreme Court of Appeal
- Incumbent
- Assumed office 1 June 2018 (Acting: 1 November 2016 – 31 May 2018)
- Appointed by: Jacob Zuma

Judge of the High Court
- In office 15 February 2013 – 31 May 2018
- Appointed by: Jacob Zuma
- Division: Western Cape

Personal details
- Born: 19 June 1958 (age 68) Athlone, Cape Town; Cape Province, Union of South Africa
- Education: University of South Africa (LLB); University of Cape Town (LLM); Harvard Law School (LLM)

Ashton Schippers (born 19 June 1958) is a South African judge of the Supreme Court of Appeal. Before his elevation to that court in June 2018, he served in the Western Cape High Court from February 2013 to May 2018. He was formerly an advocate in Cape Town, where he took silk in 2004 and where he was chairperson of the bar council between 2004 and 2006.

== Early life and education ==
Schippers was born on 19 June 1958. He was designated as Coloured under apartheid and grew up in a large family, one of seven siblings, in Bridgetown, Athlone on the Cape Flats of Cape Town. After matriculating at Bridgetown High School in Athlone, he enrolled at the University of the Western Cape, but he left in his second year in order to take up odd jobs to support himself. Instead, he studied part-time at the University of South Africa, where he completed a BProc in 1982 and an LLB in 1986.

In later years, he completed two master's degrees: an LLM at the University of Cape Town in 1988, focusing on company law and international law of the sea, and an LLM at Harvard Law School in 1991, supported by a Fulbright Scholarship and focusing on international law and constitutional law. While serving on the bench in 2019, he completed a postgraduate diploma in theology at the University of Stellenbosch.

== Legal practice ==
While an LLB student, Schippers served his articles of clerkship at a firm in Cape Town, and upon his graduation in 1986 he continued working in the city, first briefly as a prosecutor and then briefly as a magistrate. After two years as an attorney at Fairbridges Attorneys in Cape Town, he moved to Boston, Massachusetts in 1990 to take up his study at Harvard. Thereafter he worked in Washington, D. C. between 1991 and 1993, first as an attorney at Fulbright & Jaworski and then as an associate at the National Center for Dispute Resolution.

Upon his return to South Africa, Schippers was admitted to the Cape Bar as an advocate in June 1993. He was also admitted to the New York Bar in 1995. Over the next two decades, he practised as an advocate in Cape Town, taking silk on 15 February 2004. He developed a reputation for practice of public law and featured as counsel in several notable Constitutional Court cases, including Government v Grootboom, on the justiciability of socioeconomic rights; Mohamed v President, on the legality of extradition or deportation to a second country where the subject faces the death penalty (in this case, the deportation of Khalfan Khamis Mohamed to the United States); and United Democratic Movement v President, which established the constitutionality of floor-crossing.

He was the chairperson of the Cape Bar Council between 2004 and 2006, in which capacity he was involved in adjudicating a complaint of racism against Judge John Hlophe. In addition, on numerous occasions between 1998 and 2011, he served as an acting judge in the Western Cape Division of the High Court of South Africa.

== Western Cape High Court: 2013–2018 ==
In October 2012, Schippers was one of eight candidates shortlisted and interviewed for permanent appointment to five vacancies at the Western Cape High Court. He was nominated by Advocates for Transformation. During his interview with the Judicial Service Commission, Schippers was asked about the slow pace of transformation in the legal profession and raised his concern with racially skewed briefing patterns, saying that, despite his high status in the profession, he remained dependent on briefs from the state attorney because private firms were reluctant to brief black advocates. The Commission recommended Schippers as suitable for appointment, and President Jacob Zuma confirmed his appointment in February 2013, with effect from 15 February.

=== Democratic Alliance v SABC ===
Schippers's most notable judgement in the Western Cape High Court was Democratic Alliance v South African Broadcasting Corporation, in which the opposition Democratic Alliance (DA) sought an urgent interdict compelling the public South African Broadcasting Corporation (SABC) to suspend SABC executive Hlaudi Motsoeneng. The DA's application was based on a report by the Public Protector, which found evidence of misconduct by Motsoeneng and proposed as remedial action that Motsoeneng should be suspended pending a disciplinary inquiry. In October 2014, Schippers ruled in favour of the DA, granting the requested interdict. More significant, however, was his assessment of the legal status of the powers of the Public Protector, especially the power to "take remedial action" as provided for in Section 182 of the Constitution. Schippers ruled that the Public Protector's remedial action was not binding or legally enforceable in the same way as a court order, but that it was not merely recommendatory, either, and could not merely be disregarded by organs of state. According to Schippers, the decision not to implement remedial action had to be rational and could be subject to rationality review by the courts.

This reasoning was of immediate political import because of recent findings by the Public Protector against President Jacob Zuma in the Nkandlagate scandal. The incumbent Public Protector, Thuli Madonsela, objected strenuously to the judgement, saying that it undermined her office's constitutional authority and that it would make enforcement contingent on "financially crippling" litigation by the Public Protector. Several months later, Parliament's Portfolio Committee on Justice and Correctional Services, and its chairperson Mathole Motshekga, forced Madonsela publicly to apologise for having called Schippers's judgement "a cut and paste judgement".

Motsoeneng also appealed Schippers's ruling. In October 2015, in SABC v DA, the Supreme Court of Appeal dismissed his appeal, upholding Schippers's order that the SABC should institute disciplinary proceedings against Motsoeneng. However, it rejected Schippers's reasoning to this end, finding instead that the Public Protector's directives were indeed binding and enforceable. The Constitutional Court ultimately shared the Supreme Court's view in Economic Freedom Fighters v Speaker of the National Assembly, which tested the enforceability of Madonsela's directives in the Nkandla saga. Madonsela appeared as amicus curiae in the latter case, maintaining her argument that Schippers's judgement had denuded the constitutional authority of her office. Asked about the saga later, Schippers said that he accepted the decision of the appellate courts but that his own starting point had been the notion that the Public Protector's office was based on the ombudsman model.

=== Supreme Court secondment ===
During his five years in the High Court, Schippers served a lengthy stint as an acting judge in the Supreme Court of Appeal between November 2016 and May 2018. During that time, he wrote the Supreme Court's unanimous judgement in Scalabrini Centre v Minister of Home Affairs, setting aside as unlawful the Department of Home Affairs's decision to close the Cape Town Refugee Reception Office.

== Supreme Court of Appeal: 2018–present ==
In April 2018, Schippers was one of nine candidates shortlisted for three permanent vacancies at the Supreme Court of Appeal. He was nominated by Senior Counsel Vincent Maleka, who noted "his industry and pursuit of justice". During his interview with the Judicial Service Commission, he was asked about his judgement in DA v SABC and commended for his contribution to the development of junior counsel from underrepresented groups; he said that, as Senior Counsel, he had always practised with black juniors, aside from one instance when a white female junior was "foisted" upon him. The Judicial Service Commission recommended him for appointment, alongside Tati Makgoka and Mahube Molemela, and he joined the bench on 1 June 2018.

== Personal life ==
He is married to Brenda Schippers and has two children. He is Christian, and, an avid cyclist, has completed multiple long-distance cyclosportives through the Alps and Pyrenees as well as many Argus Cycle Tours.
