= Linksfield =

- Location within Gauteng Location within South Africa
- Coordinates: 26°09′50″S 28°05′56″E
- Country: South Africa
- Province: Gauteng
- Municipality: City of Johannesburg
- Main Place: Johannesburg
- Established: 1922

Area
  - Total: 8.66 km^{2} (3.34 sq mi)

Population (2011)
  - Total: 3,696
  - Density: 427/km^{2} (1,110/sq mi)

Racial makeup (2011)
  - Black African: 33.06%
  - Coloured: 1.3%
  - Indian/Asian: 1.52%
  - White: 63.8%
  - Other: 0.32%

First languages (2011)
  - English: 73.0%
  - Greek: 6.01%
  - Zulu: 4.72%
  - Northern Sotho: 4.69%
  - Afrikaans: 4.28%
  - Hebrew: 4.17%
  - Yiddish: 3.13%
- Time zone: UTC+2 (SAST)
- Postal code (street): 2192

Linksfield is a suburb of Johannesburg, South Africa. It is a suburb lying north-east of the Johannesburg CBD and is surrounded southerly by Linksfield Ridge, easterly by Linksfield North and Bedford, St Andrews and Senderwood. Linksfield itself is located in Region E of the City of Johannesburg Metropolitan Municipality. On the southerly side and over the ridge are the areas of Cyrildene, Observatory and Morninghill, but these suburbs are not visible to Linksfield as they are hidden behind the Linksfield Ridge.

The suburb has long been associated with its Jewish community and is home to the largest campus in the King David Schools network.

== History ==
The suburb is located on part of an old Witwatersrand farm called Doornfontein. In 1910, the area was known as Muller's Plantation and it was many years later and after several attempts, before the land was successfully surveyed. It would be proclaimed as suburb on 8 March 1922 and its name is derived from the word Links and its closeness to the nearby Royal Johannesburg & Kensington Golf Club. The suburb was developed by A.M. Kennedy and Hermann Kallenbach. Kallenbach would build a house on Linksfield Ridge in 1929. The Huddlepark Golf Course and Driving Range borders with Linksfield and Linksfield North.

Jacques and Riva Morgenstern, Jewish emigrants from Poland and Lithuania formed an architecture practice Morgenstern and Morgenstern and settled in the suburb. In 1952, Riva became the first woman in the Union of South Africa to receive a diploma in town planning.The couple built House Morgenstern in the 1950s on Kallenbach Drive. The house featured several designs by sculptor Edoardo Villa. In 1954, the couple won the Model House Competition run by The Star. The next year, they were awarded the South African Institute of Architects Award of Merit for their design. The house was inspired by Fallingwater, designed by architect Frank Lloyd Wright. In 1964, the house received the Transvaal Institute of Architects Award of Merit for the best house in ten years.

In 1968, architect J. M. Gerald Gordon designed his own home, Gerald Gordon House on New Mountain Road in Linksfield Ridge and lived there until his death in 2016. The home was commemorated with a "Blue Plaque" by the Johannesburg Heritage Foundation in 2021.

During the apartheid era, it was classed as a "whites only" area under the terms of the Group Areas Act. It has, for decades been a centre for Johannesburg's Jewish community. In 1971, Jews made up 75.7% of residents.

== Parks and greenspace ==
The Harvey Nature Reserve lies on the western part of Linksfield Ridge. The land was donated to the people of Johannesburg in 1959 by Sydney Harvey and consisted of 7 acres for a nature and bird sanctuary. It is maintained by the Johannesburg City Parks. The area borders with the controversial Rietfontein farm that was donated by President Paul Kruger to the people of Johannesburg as a tropical disease Hospital in approximately 1895. It is now known as Sizwe Hospital. The farm has the only pristine natural grasslands left in Johannesburg and is still the home for the Vervet monkeys and much natural fauna and flora. Unfortunately the farm is under threat for development.

== Education ==
The suburb has two schools within it. Linksfield Primary School which has been open since 31 July 1950. The second is a Jewish school called King David Schools, Linksfield and was founded in 1948 and the high school in 1955. In close proximity is the Greek School, SAHETI School, and the English Girls' School, St Andrews.

== Houses of worship ==
- Linkshul, formally known as Linksfield Senderwood Hebrew Congregation, an Orthodox Jewish congregation on Club St, Linksfield

== Notable residents past and present ==
- Jani Allan, columnist, lived on Kallenbach Drive in Linksfield Ridge with her husband, Gordon Schachat in the 1980s
- J. M. Gerald Gordon, an architect, lived on New Mountain Road in Linksfield Ridge from 1969 to 2016
- L. Ron Hubbard, an American author and the founder of Scientology, lived on Hannaben St in Linksfield Ridge in 1960
