= Disa esterhuyseniae =

Scientific classification
- Kingdom: Plantae
- Clade: Tracheophytes
- Clade: Angiosperms
- Clade: Monocots
- Order: Asparagales
- Family: Orchidaceae
- Subfamily: Orchidoideae
- Genus: Disa
- Species: D. esterhuyseniae

Binomial name
- Disa esterhuyseniae Schelpe ex H.P.Linder

Synonyms
- Amphigena esterhuyseniae (Schelpe ex H.P.Linder) Szlach.

Species of flowering plant

Disa esterhuyseniae, commonly known as Esterhuysen's disa, is a perennial plant and geophyte belonging to the genus Disa and is part of the fynbos. The plant is endemic to the Western Cape and occurs from Franschhoek to the Cederberg. The plant is considered rare.
