= Erica doliiformis =

Scientific classification
- Kingdom: Plantae
- Clade: Tracheophytes
- Clade: Angiosperms
- Clade: Eudicots
- Clade: Asterids
- Order: Ericales
- Family: Ericaceae
- Genus: Erica
- Species: E. doliiformis

Binomial name
- Erica doliiformis Salisb.

Synonyms
- Callista blanda G.Don; Erica blanda Andrews; Erica mammosa Thunb.; Erica tenuibractea Bolus; Ericoides blandum (Andrews) Kuntze; Ericoides doliiforme Kuntze; Syringodea doliiformis G.Don

Species of flowering plant

Erica doliiformis is a plant belonging to the genus Erica and forming part of the fynbos. The species is endemic to the Western Cape and occurs from the Elandskloof Mountains to Franschhoek. The plant is rare, it grows on mountain slopes and the subpopulations are small. It does not occur in large numbers.
