= Margot Janse =

Dutch chef (born 1969)

- Born: Naarden
- Culinary career
- Previous restaurant(s): Le Quartier Français
- Award(s) won: Eat Out DStv Chef of the Year 2002, 2012; Relais & Châteaux Inaugural Rising Chef Trophy 2006; First Relais & Châteaux Grand Chef in Africa 2007

Margot Janse (born 1969, Naarden) is a Dutch chef, best known for her work as head chef of Le Quartier Français in Franschhoek, South Africa.

== Career ==
Born in Naarden and raised in Bussum in the Netherlands, Margot Janse originally travelled to Africa in 1989 alongside her South African boyfriend when he was offered a job in Zimbabwe as a reporter. They lived in Harare, where she worked as a waitress. His job took the couple to Zambia, where she met the recently released South African political prisoners Ahmed Kathrada and Walter Sisulu while taking photographs for her boyfriend. Following the release of Nelson Mandela, he also visited Zambia where Janse met him.

Janse moved to South Africa following the end of apartheid, where she lived in Johannesburg. She began working at Ciro Molinaro's Italian restaurant Parktown North on the other side of the city, where she would do double shifts to earn a living. She then moved to Cape Town, where she worked at the Bay Hotel. In 1995, she was hired as a sous chef at the Le Quartier Français in Franschhoek. When the head chef moved back to Johannesburg to work with Molinaro, Janse was promoted into the role. At the time, the restaurant was already award winning and had been named South Africa's Restaurant of the Year.

She introduced tasting menus to South Africa when she created the Tasting Room within the restaurant. In 2000, she spent three months in The French Laundry under chef Thomas Keller. Over the course of her time at Le Quartier Francais, she was named Eat Out DStv chef of the year in both 2002 and 2012. The restaurant was named eight best in The World's 50 Best Restaurants. By 2012, the restaurant had been named in the 10 ten list of South African restaurants on 11 occasions. After 21 years at the restaurant, Janse left Le Quartier Francais on 29 April 2017.

== Personal ==
Janse has competed in marathons to raise money for charities and local schools. In 2009, she began a scheme where muffins were baked for a small creche each Friday at Le Quartier Français. Following donations, this grew to a daily production for 200 pre-primary school children each day, and 1100 breakfasts.
