= Erica sacciflora =

Scientific classification
- Kingdom: Plantae
- Clade: Tracheophytes
- Clade: Angiosperms
- Clade: Eudicots
- Clade: Asterids
- Order: Ericales
- Family: Ericaceae
- Genus: Erica
- Species: E. sacciflora

Binomial name
- Erica sacciflora Salisb.

Synonyms
- Syringodea epistomia (Sinclair) G.Don; Syringodea sacciflora G.Don

Species of flowering plant

Erica sacciflora is a plant belonging to the genus Erica and is part of the fynbos. The species is endemic to the Western Cape and occurs in the Franschhoek Mountains. The plant has an area of occurrence of 87 km^{2}, much of which has been lost to forestry activities: the planting of plantations. The remaining habitat has been encroached upon by pine trees and other invasive plants. At one stage, no subpopulation could be found. Fortunately, after a process of clearing the invasive plants, a subpopulation was rediscovered. It is suspected that more subpopulations will be rediscovered after further clearing work and even veldfires. Ongoing clearing work is necessary to preserve the subpopulations.
