= Dutch Reformed Church, Franschhoek =

Dutch Reformed Church
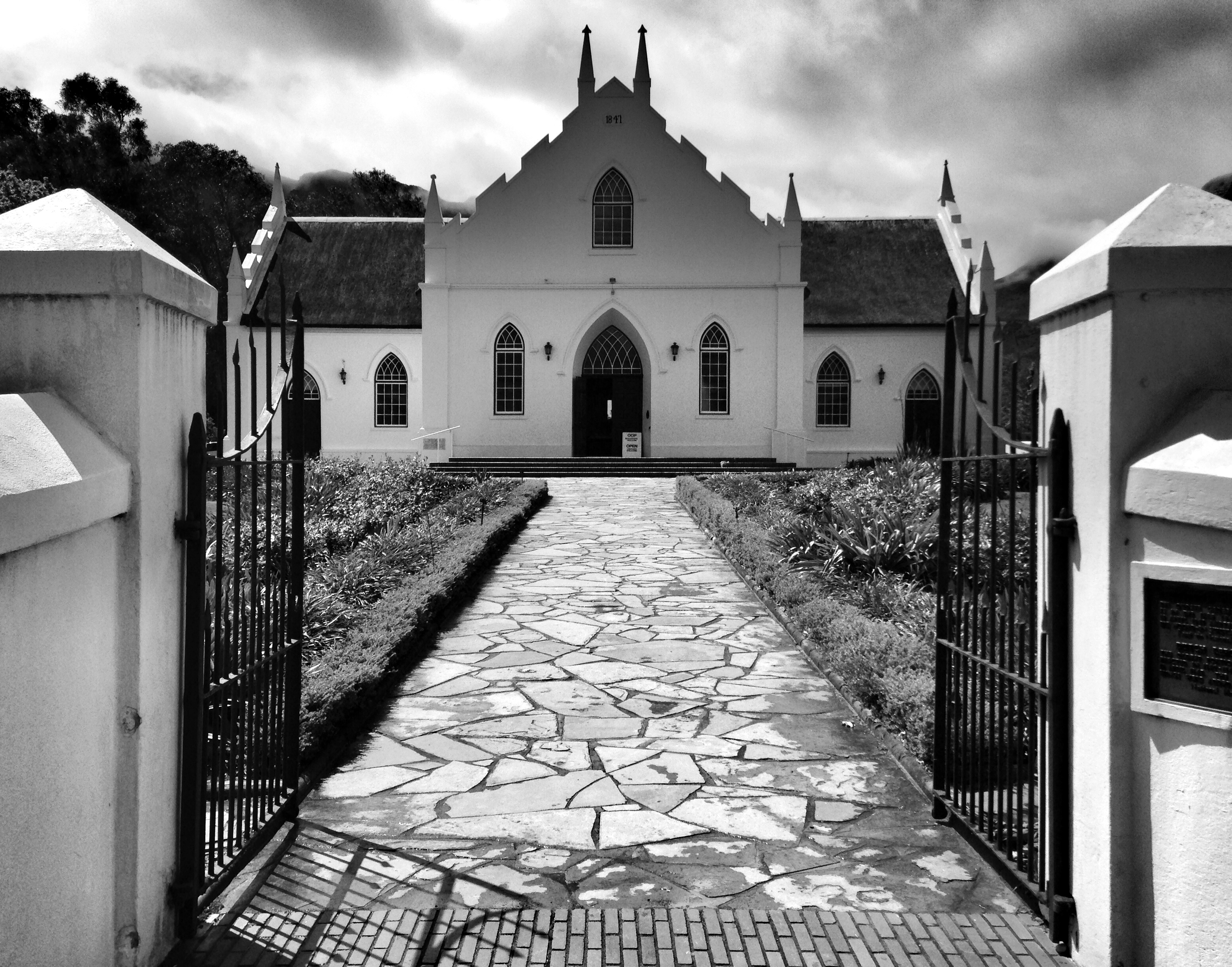
- Dutch Reformed Church
- 33.90934°S 19.11912°E
- Location: Franschhoek
- Country: South Africa
- Denomination: Nederduits Gereformeerde Kerk

History
- Founded: 1847

Architecture
- Functional status: Church

The Dutch Reformed Church is a Dutch Reformed church in Franschhoek, South Africa. The church was built in 1847 and is situated on the main road running through the town. This valley, tightly hemmed in by mountains, is named after the French Huguenots who fled to the Cape after religious persecution in 1688. They brought with them knowledge of viniculture and settled to make wine.

In 1923 a new organ was purchased at a cost of £1,200 (equivalent to £212,400 in 2013 or about R3,800,00 in 2013). In 1926, the presbytery completely renovated which also involved substantial costs for the church with it. From 1929 on services in the church were held in Afrikaans instead of Dutch. The first Afrikaans church council minutes dating from December 1929 From 1933 uses Afrikaans Bibles and from 1937 used with an Afrikaans Psalter.

In the years 1967 and 1968 the building was extensively restored at a cost of R60,000 (equivalent to roughly R5,000,000 in 2013) with restorations completed on 16 and 17 November 1968. An earthquake occurred a year later causing only minor damage to the building due to the restoration work completed the previous year. The building was declared Nasionale Memorable in 1972 during the ministry of Rev. Muller. In 1975, the building was equipped with a sound system.

== List of ministers ==
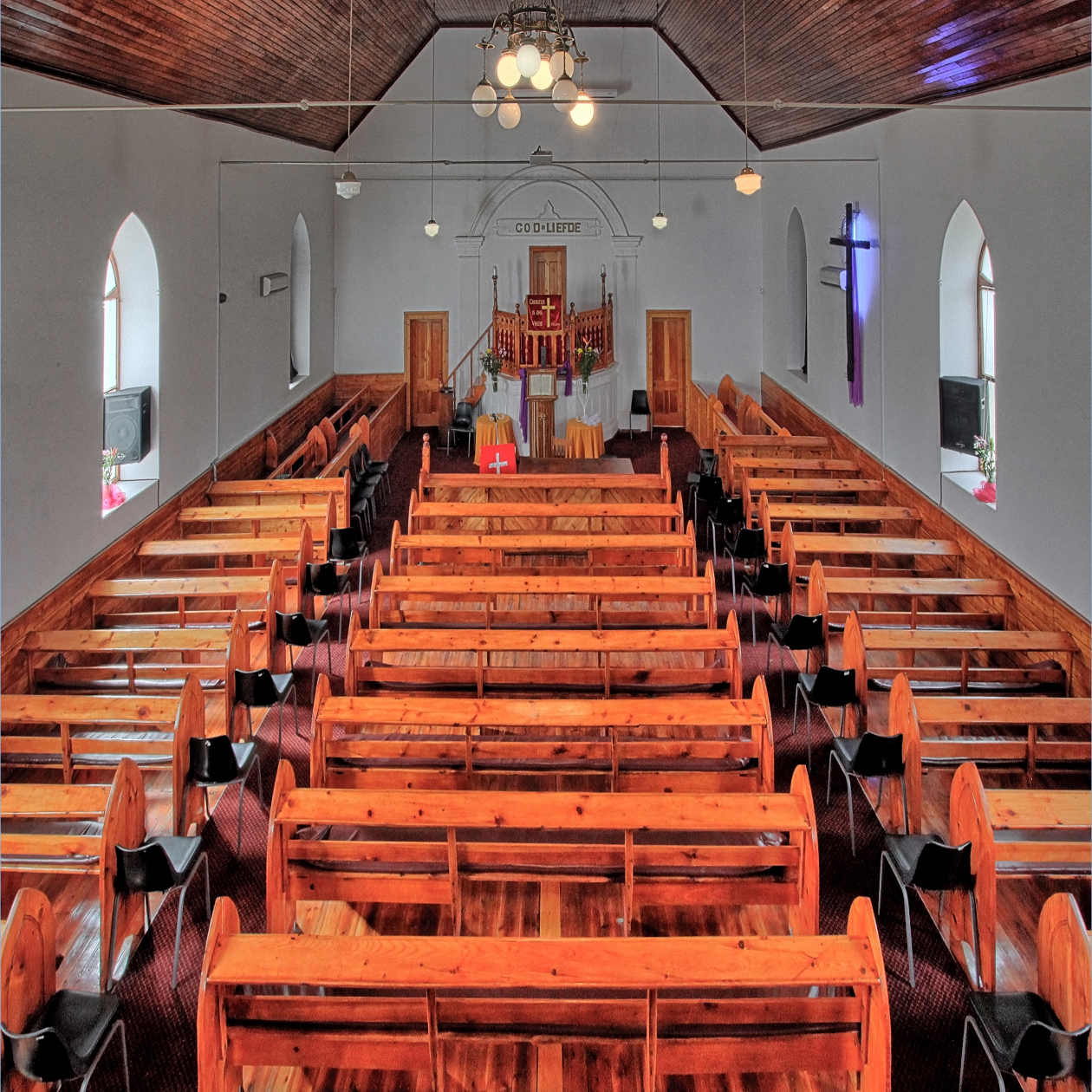
A view of the interior of the church.

- Pieter Nicolaas Ham, 1845–1864
- Johannes Gerhardus Olivier, 1869–1873
- Jacobus George Joubert Krige, 1873–1881
- Pieter Daniël Rossouw, 1881–1883
- Jan Andries Beyers, 1884–1889
- Andries Francois Malan, 1889-1889 and 1899–1919
- Pieter Jozef Cruze, 1892–1894
- Stefanus Jacobus Perold, 1895–1898
- Adriaan Jacobus van Wijk, 1919–1943
- Zacharias Blomerus Loots, 1943–1947
- Marthinus Smuts Louw, 1947–1964
- Gys Muller, 1965–1985
- Willem Jakobus van Zyl, 1985–2000
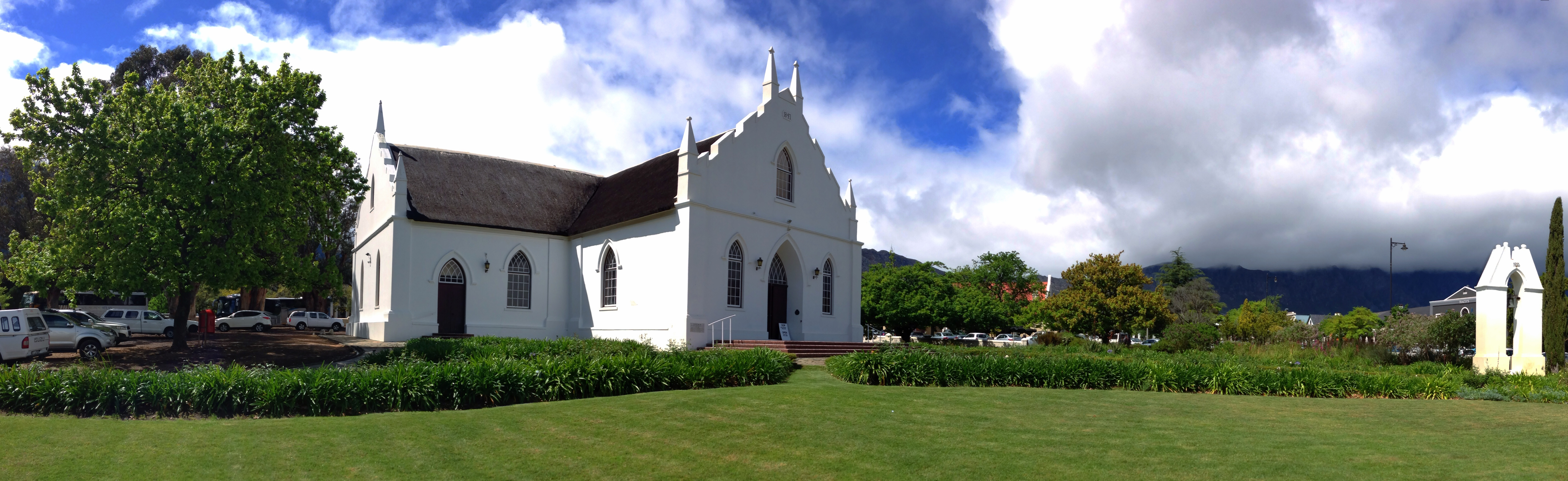
A panoramic view of the Dutch Reformed Church in Franschhoek. The church bell is visible on the far right of the picture.

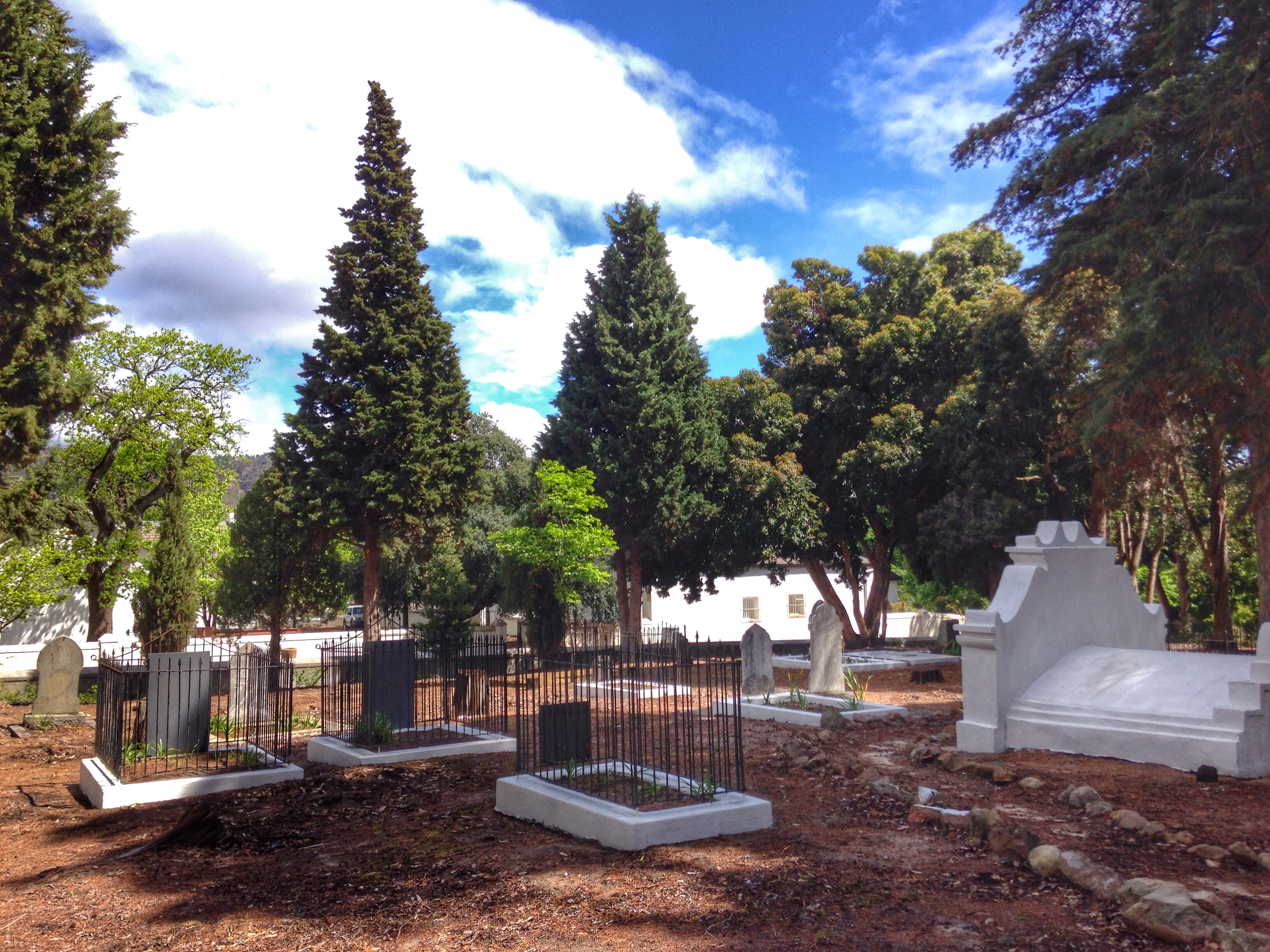
The cemetery on Dirkie Uys Street just behind the church.

== Gallery ==
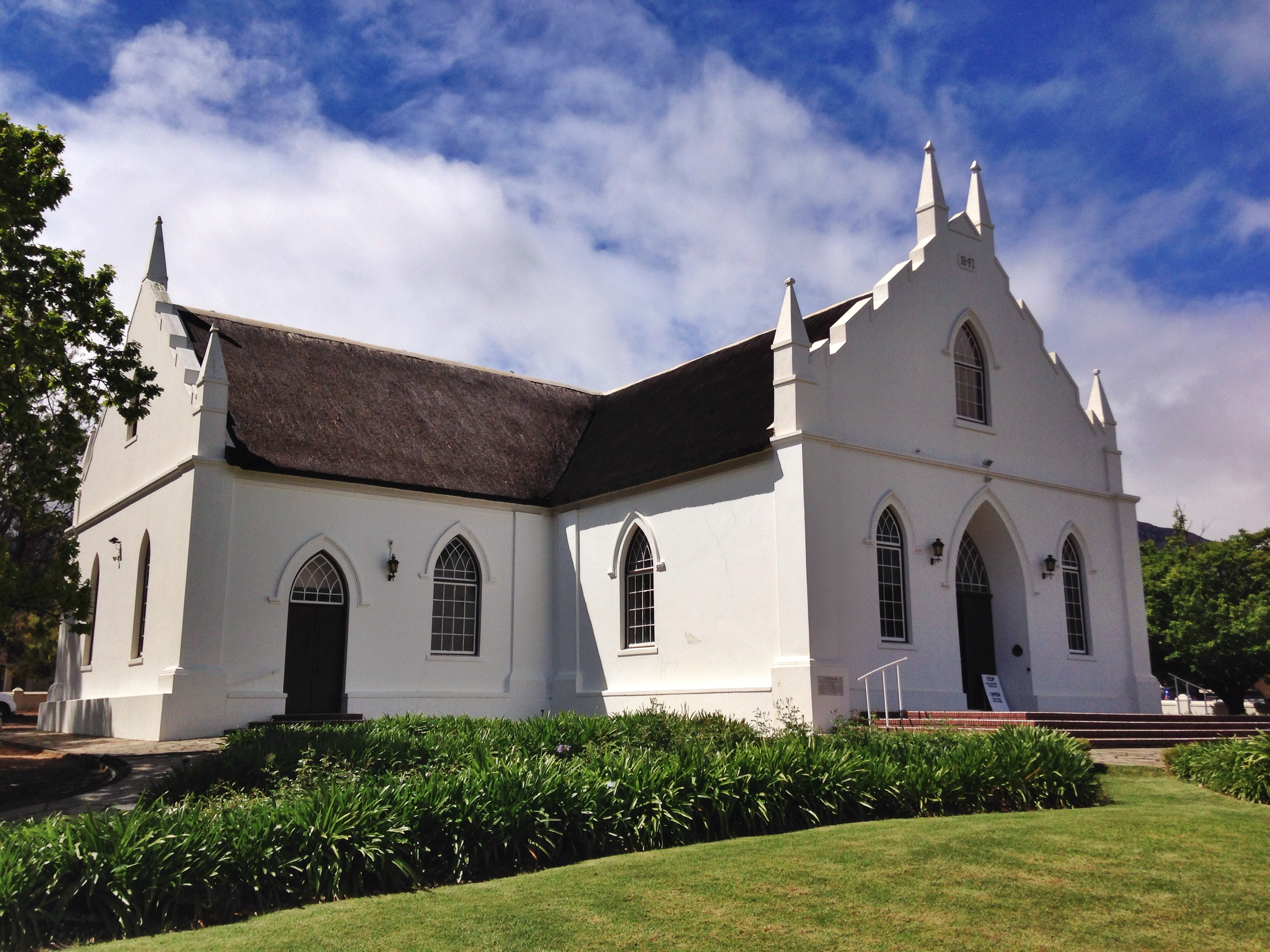
View of the church from outside.

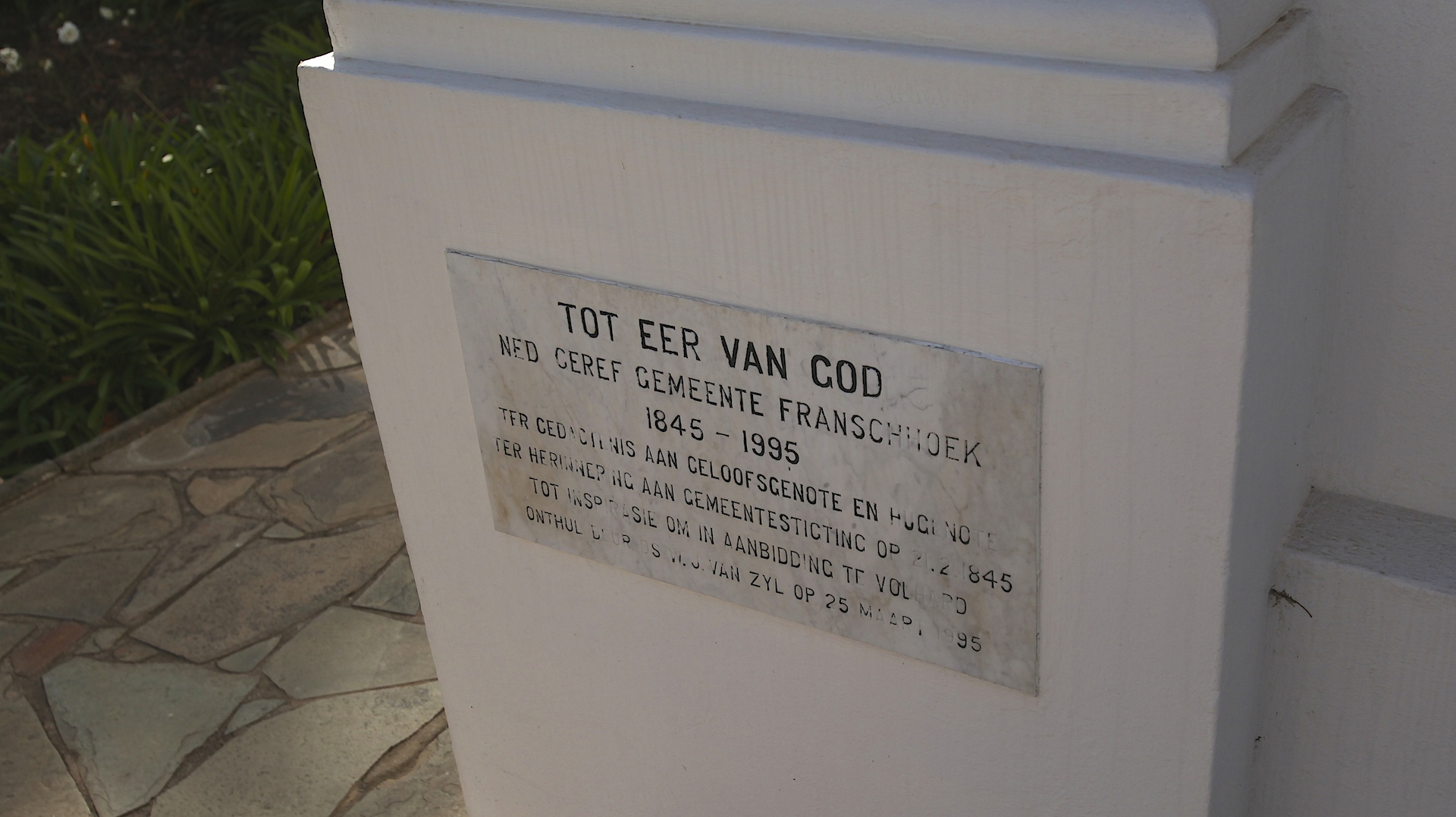
The commemoration plaque at the entrance to the church.

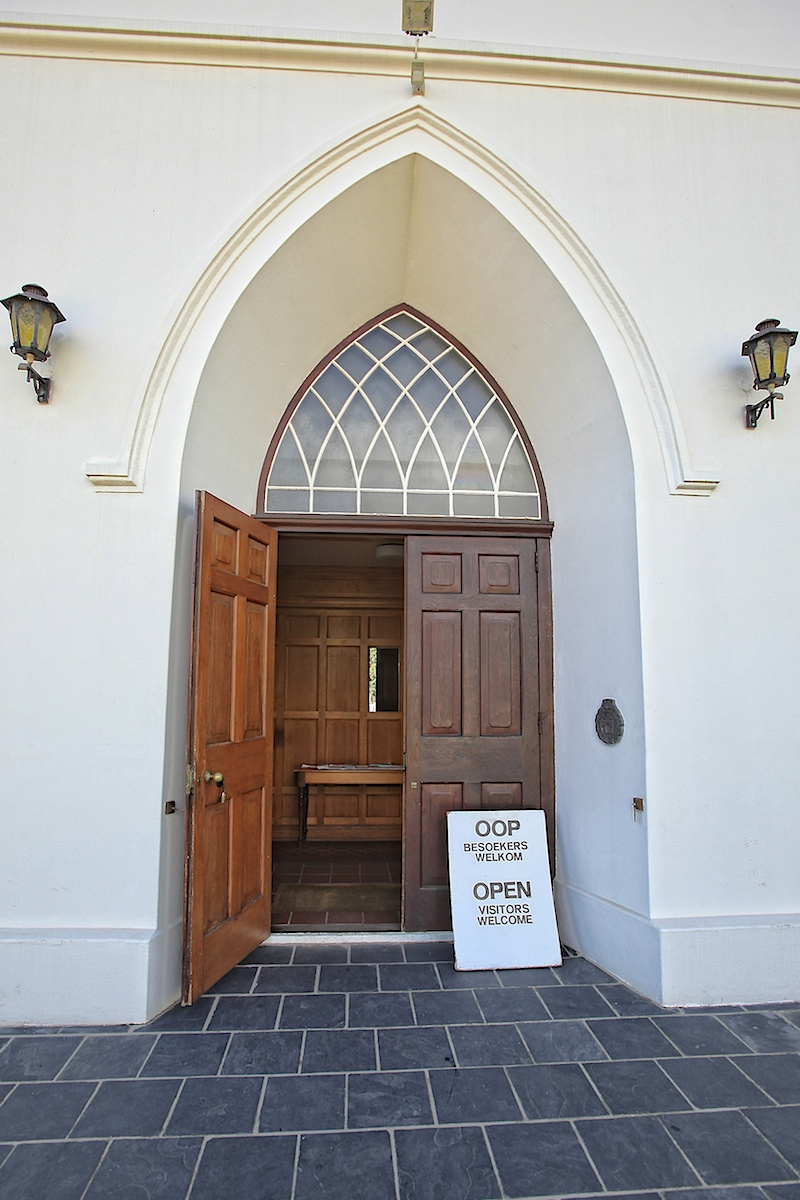
Front door of the church.

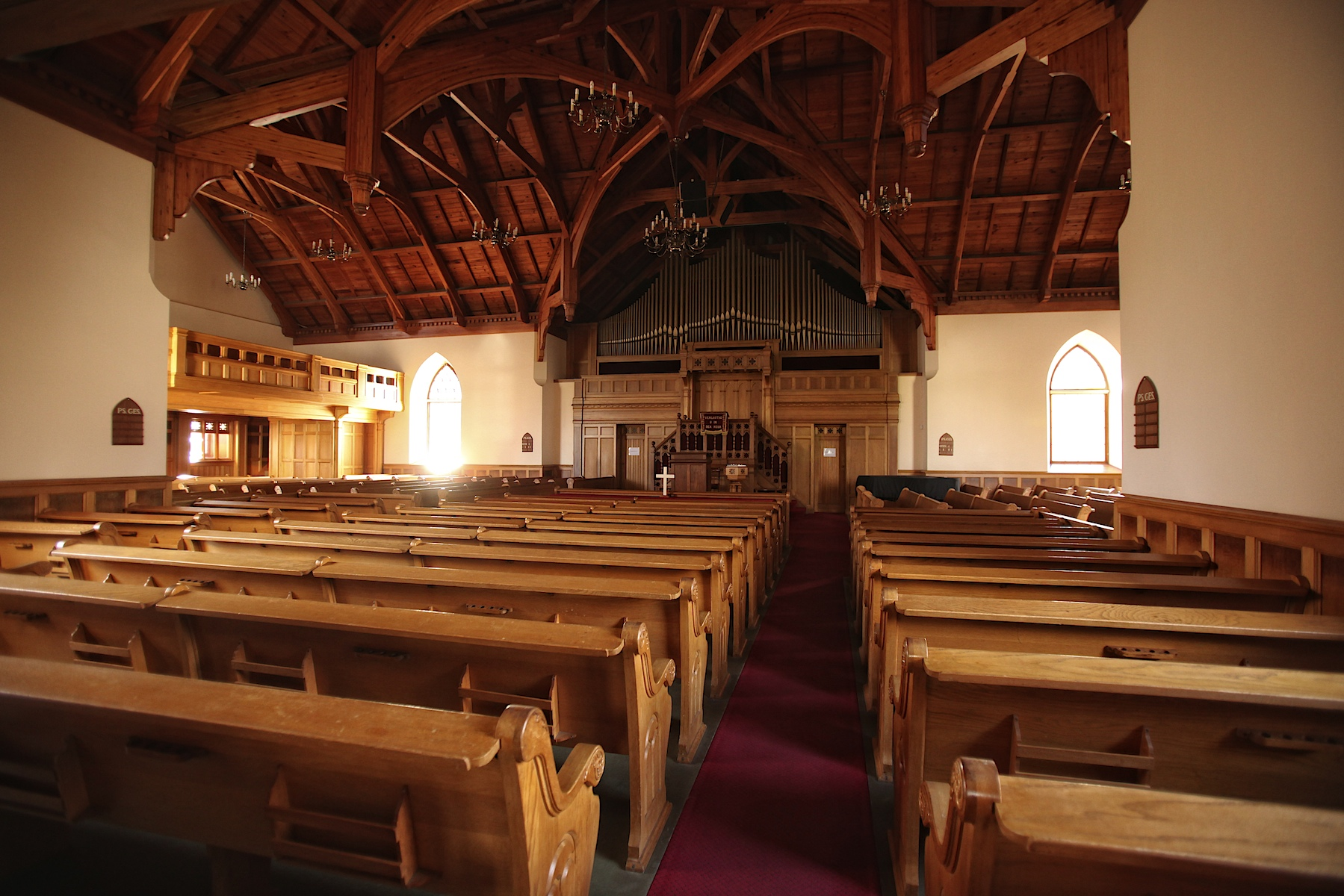
Interior of the church and its pews.

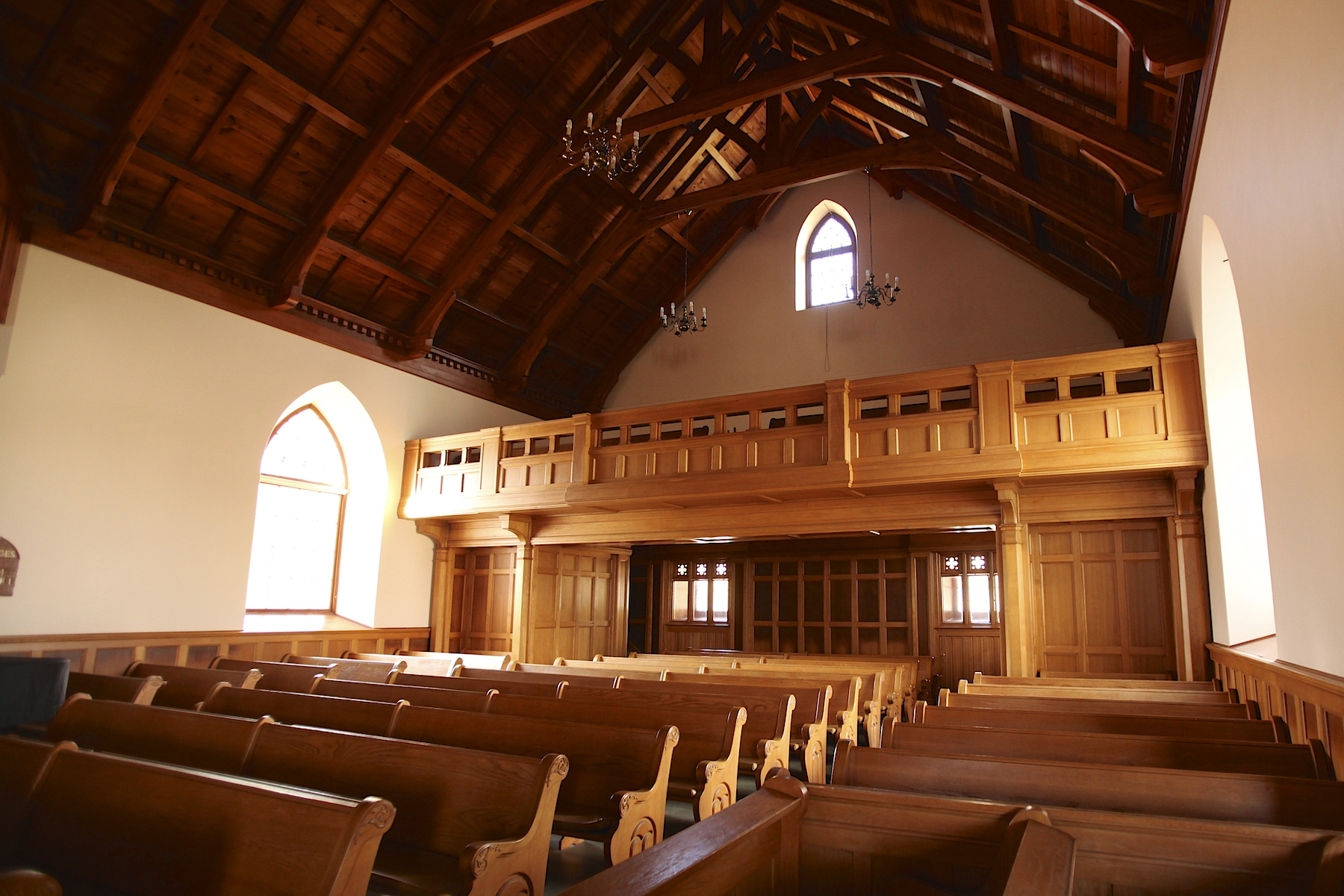
Interior of the church and its pews.

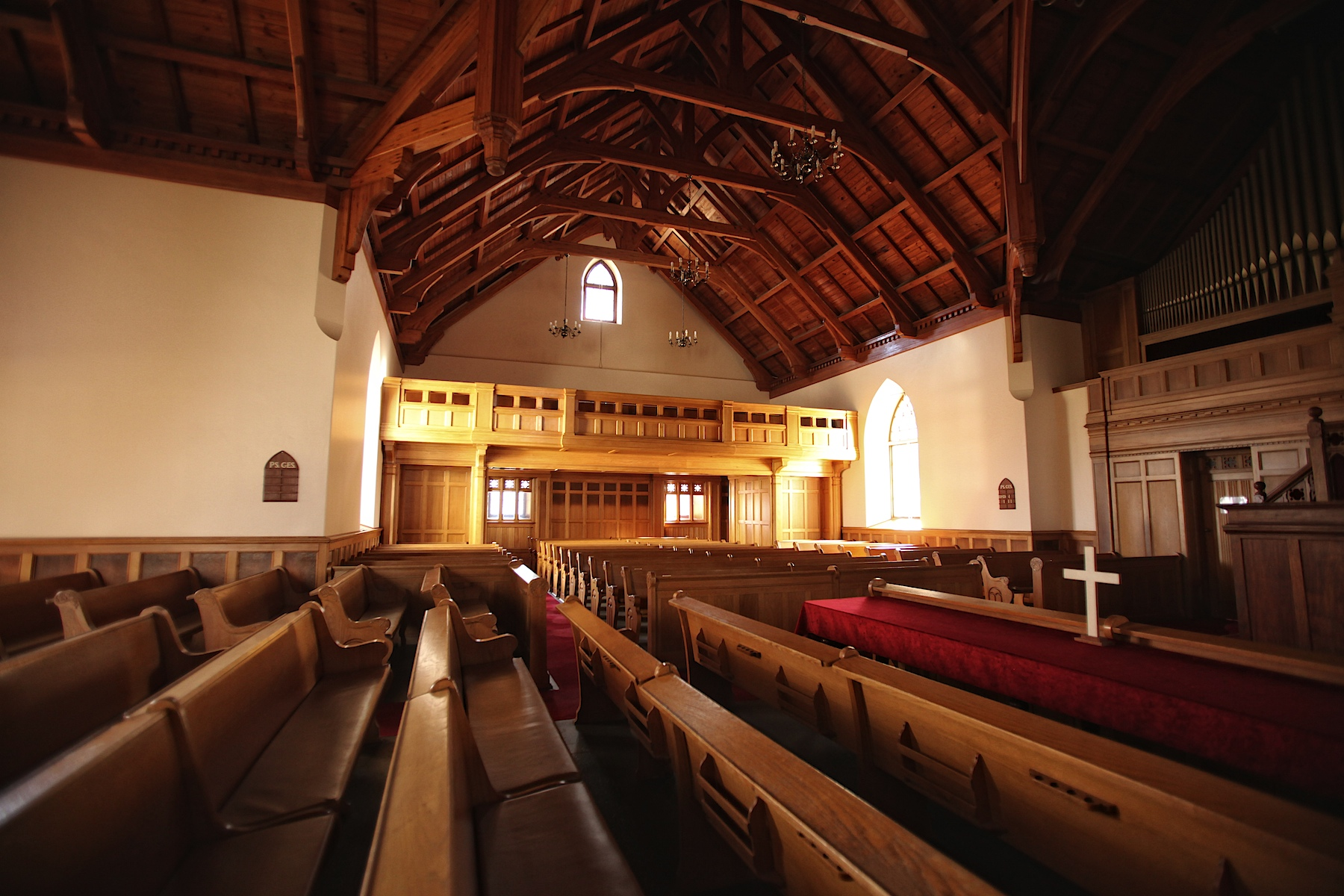
Interior of the church and its pews.

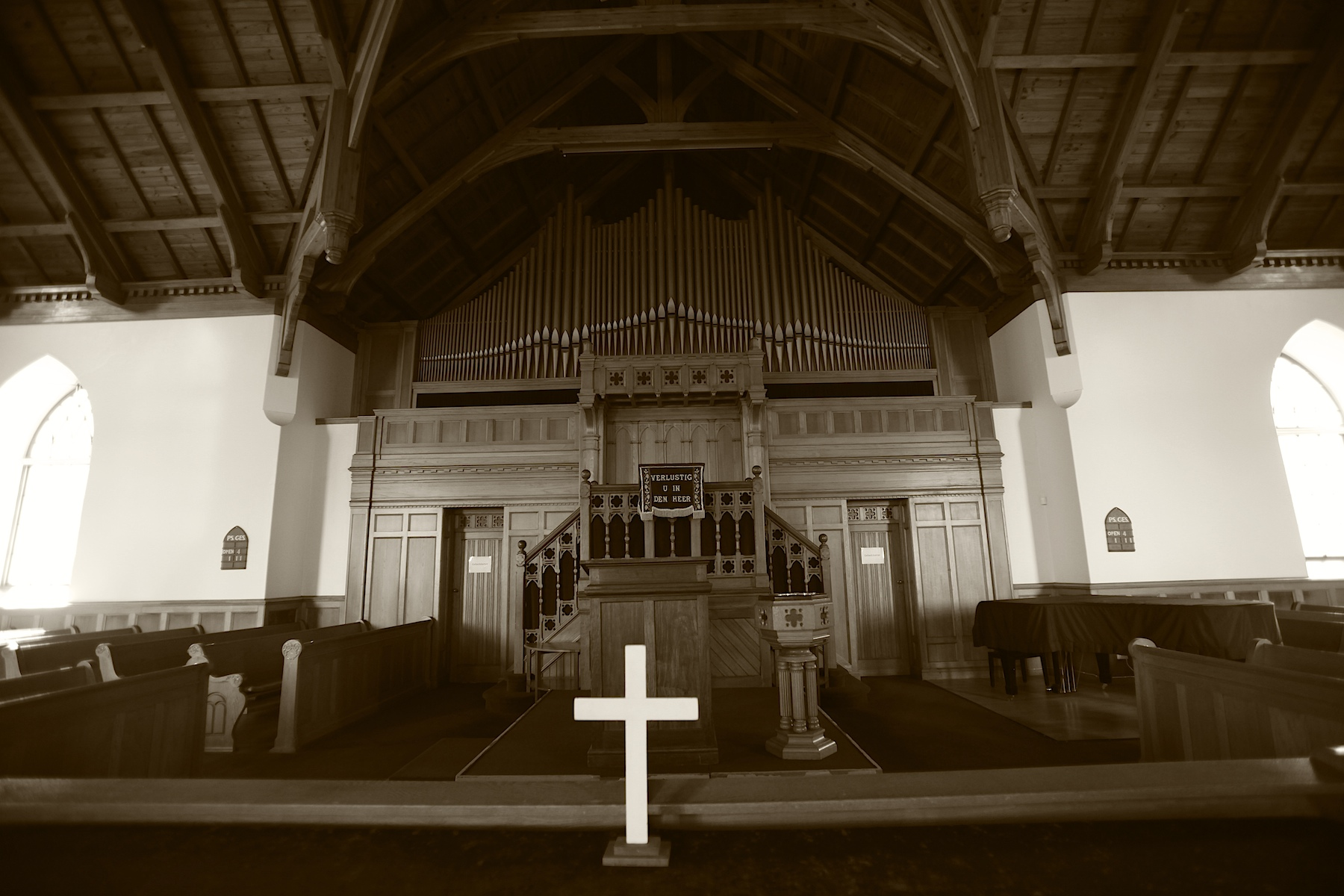
Interior of the church and its pews.

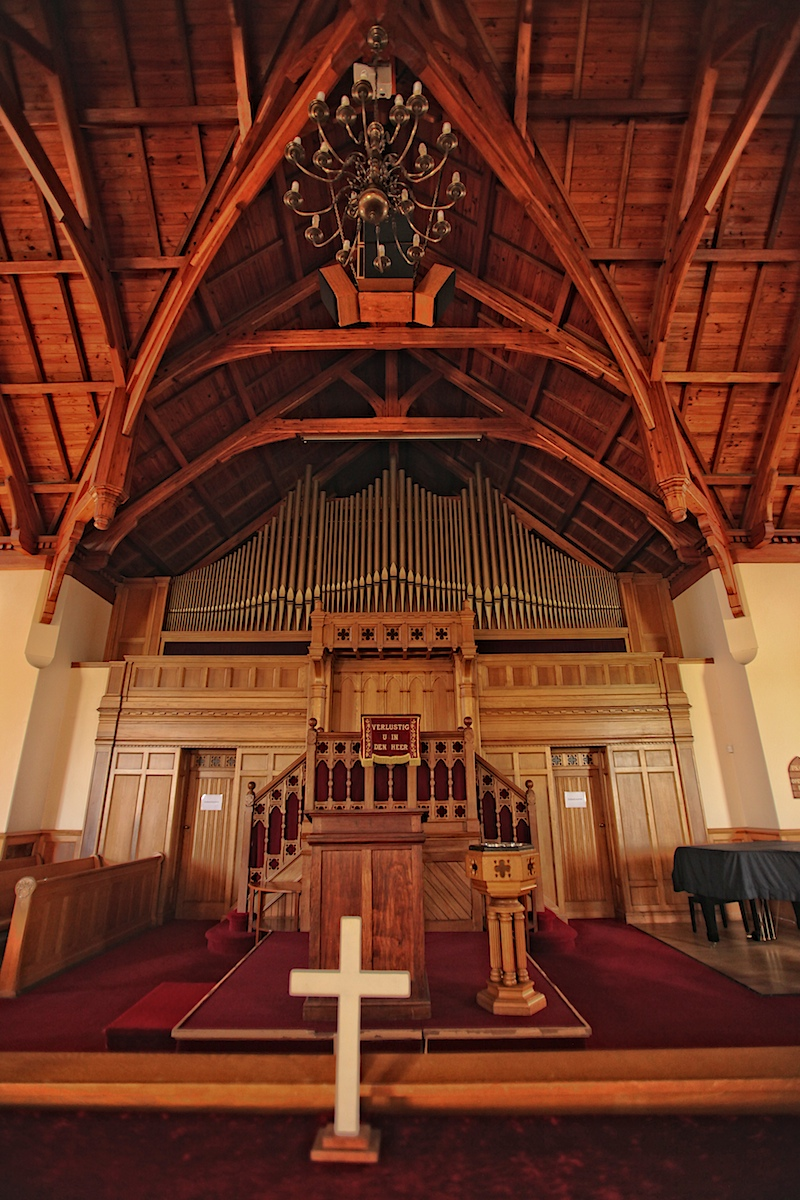
Interior of the church and pulpit.

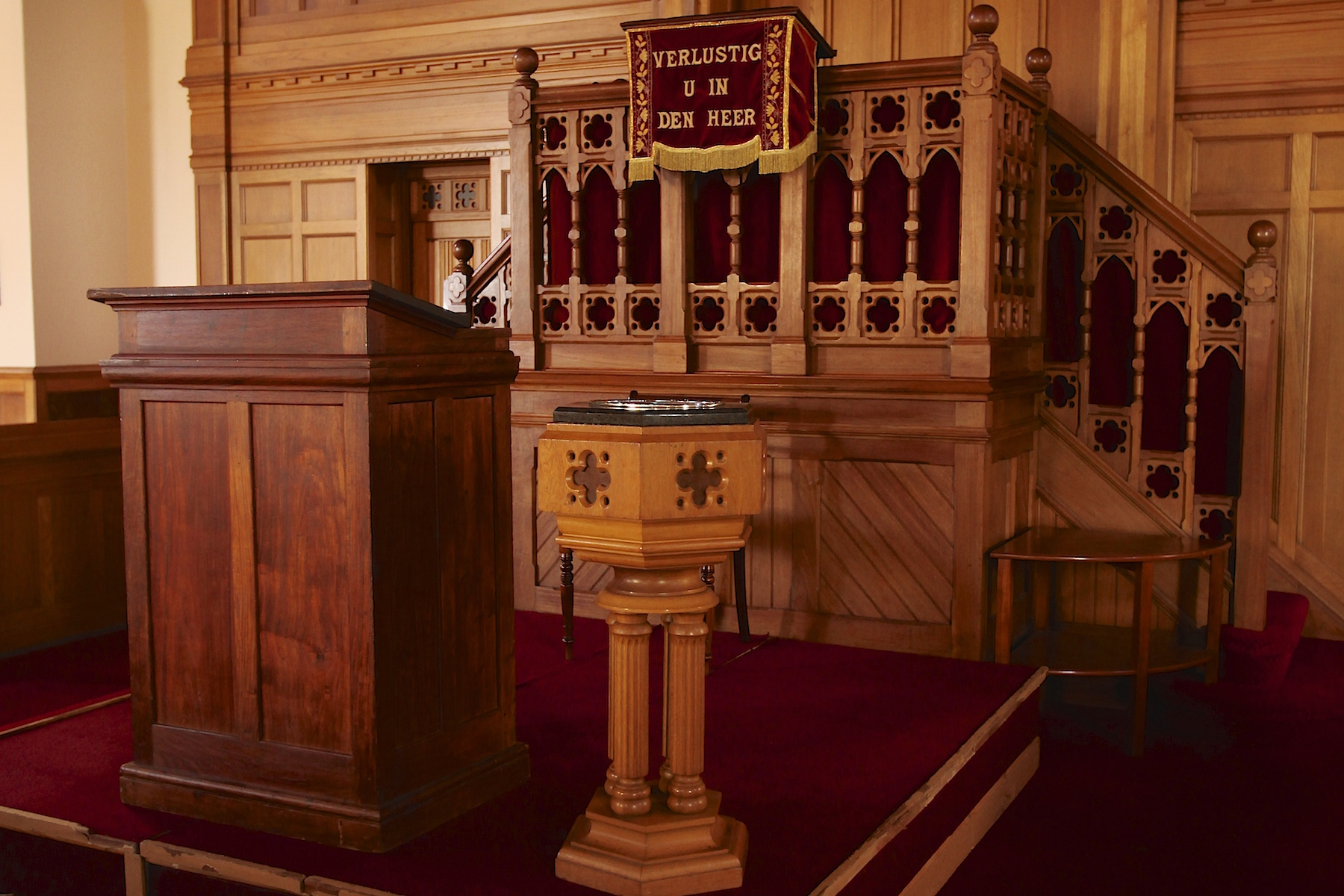
Interior of the church and pulpit.

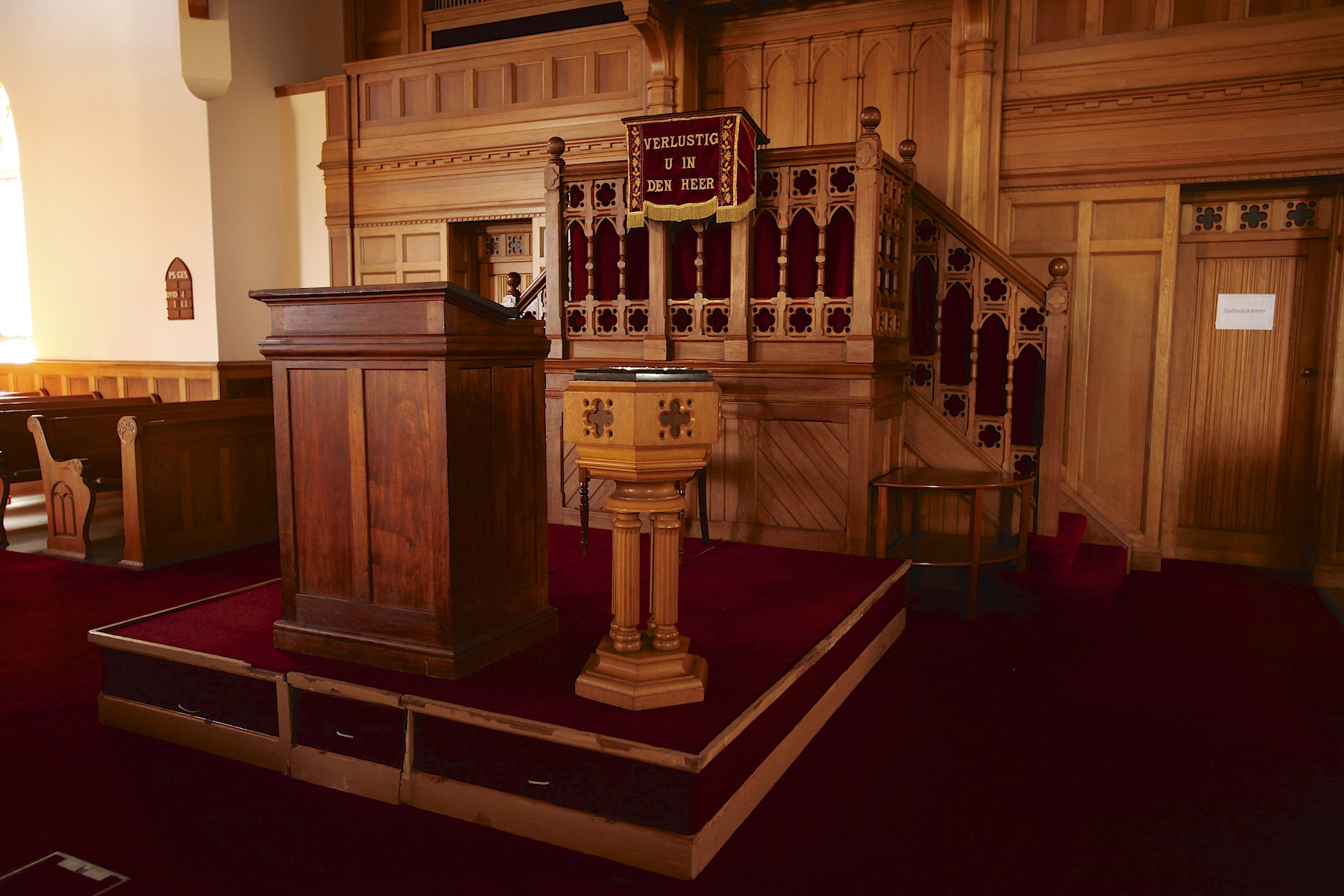
Interior of the church and pulpit.

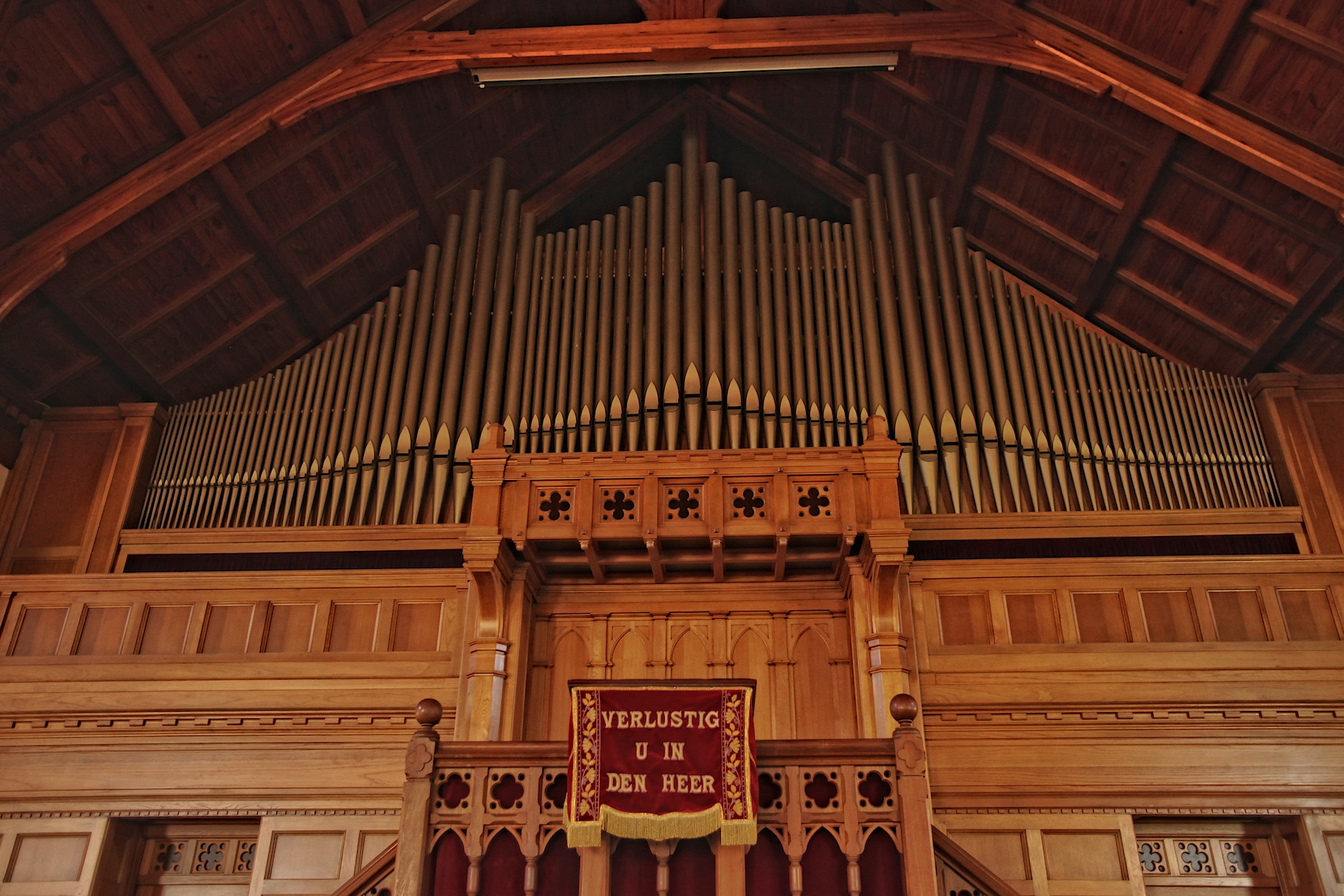
Interior of the church and pulpit.

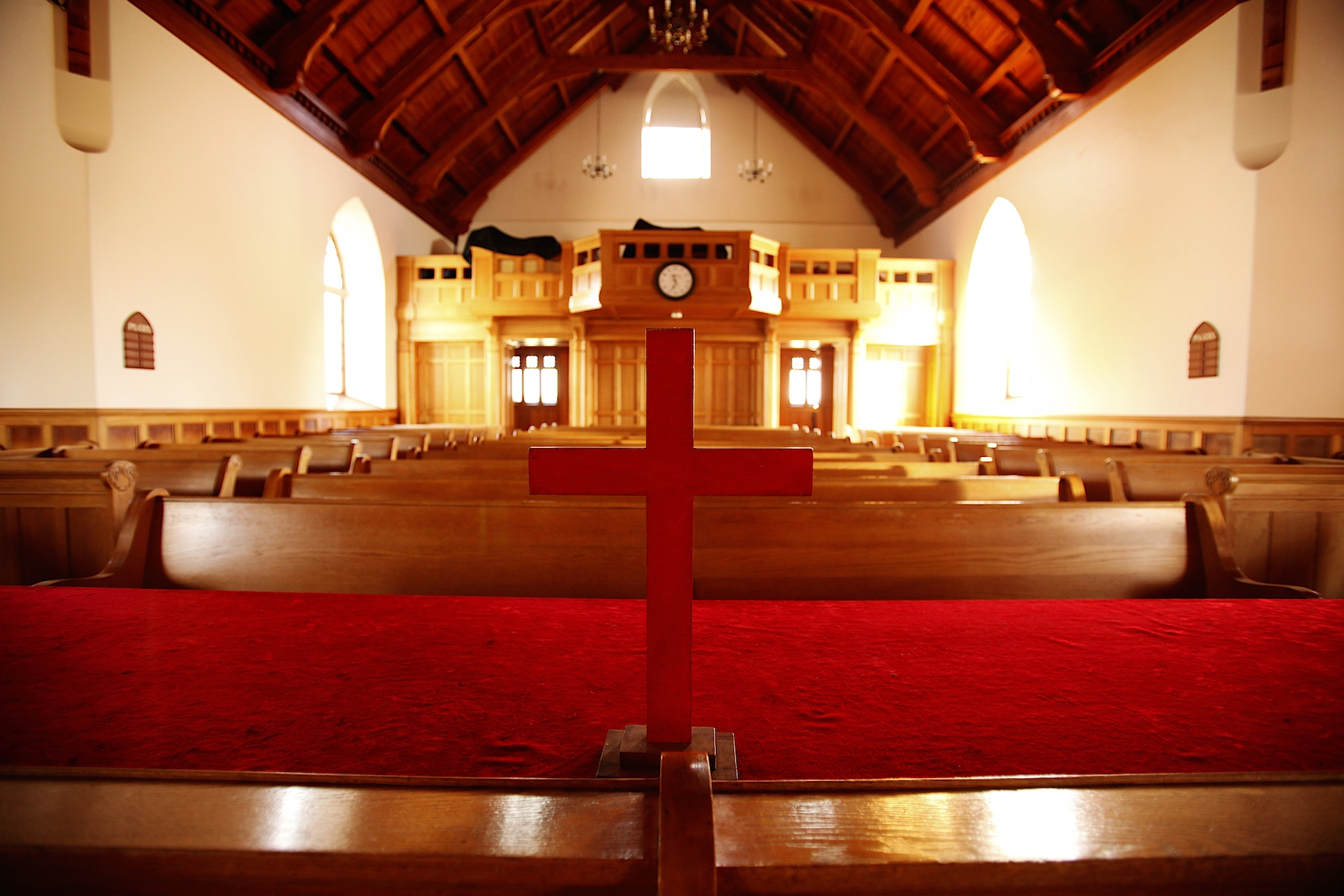
Interior of the church and pulpit.

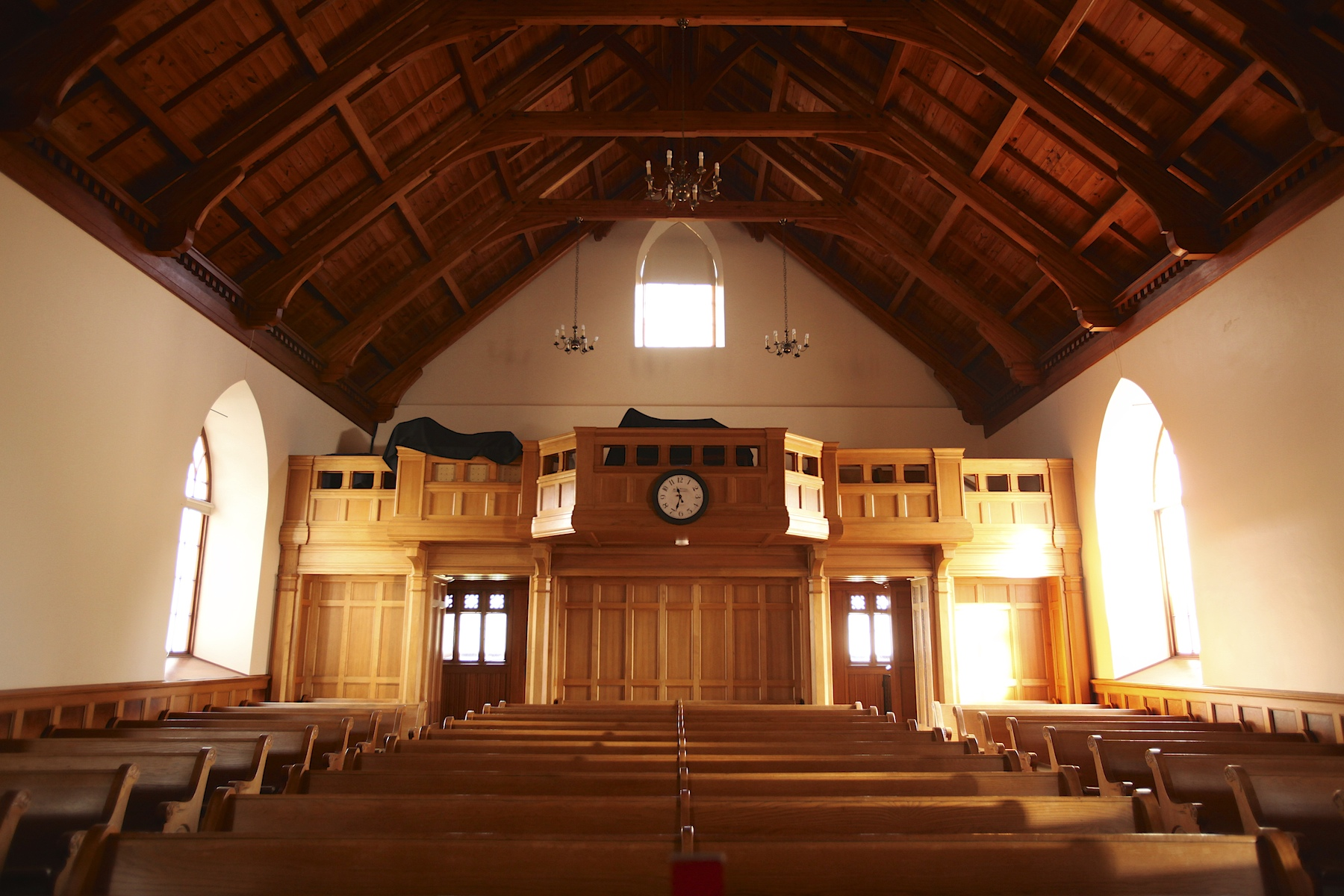
Interior of the church and pulpit.

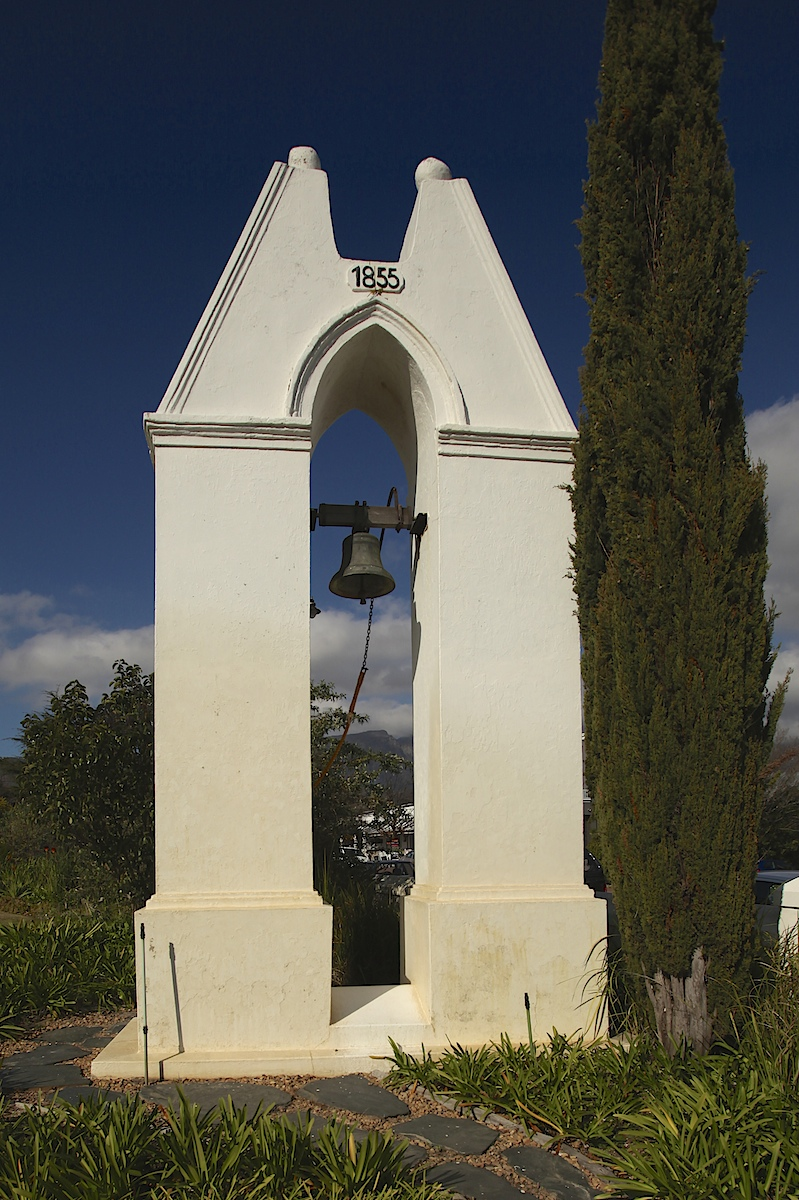
View of the externally placed church bell.
