= Haute Cabrière =

Vineyard estate in Franschhoek, South Africa

Coordinates: 33°54′44″S 19°7′5″E

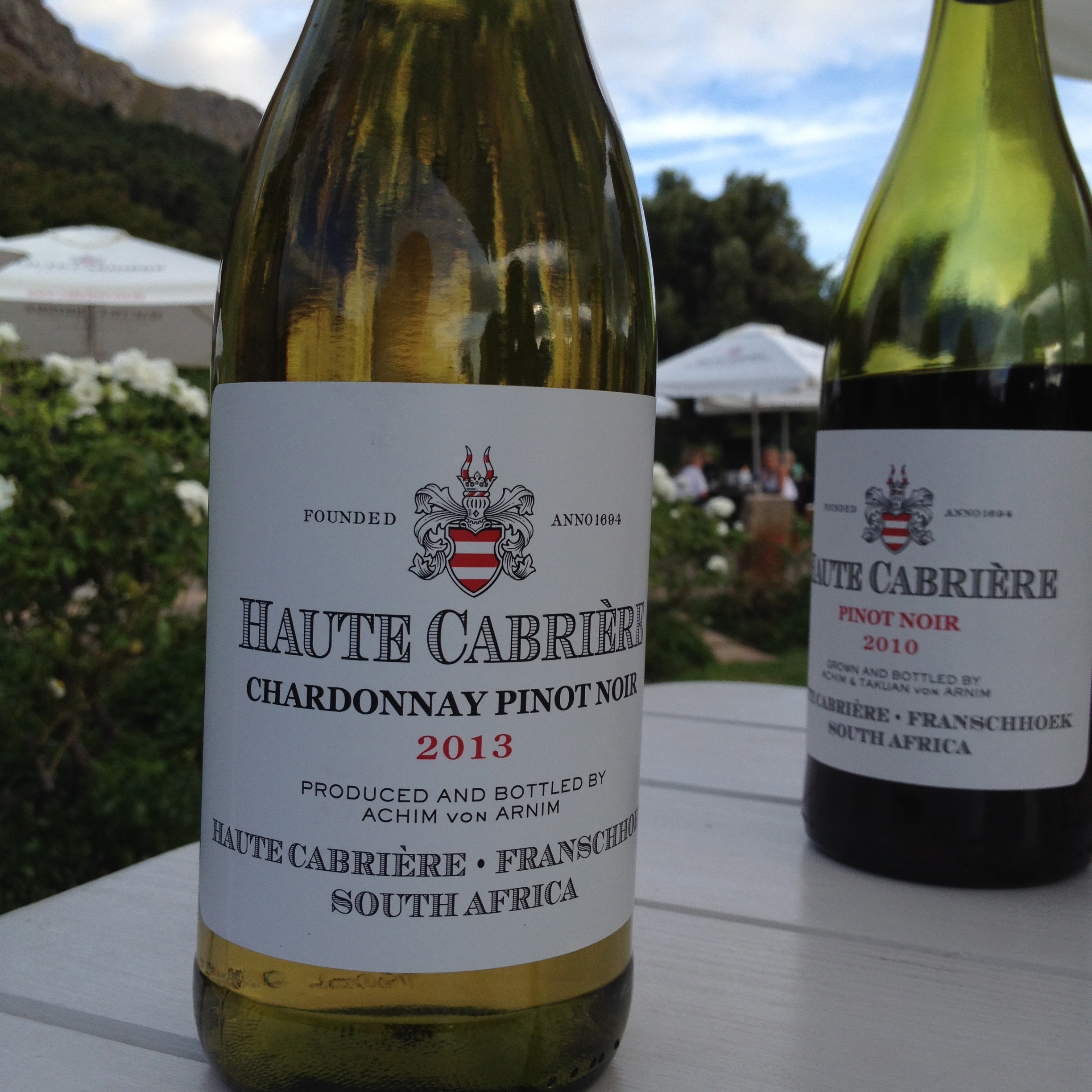
Bottles

Haute Cabrière is a South African vineyard estate located in Franschhoek (Stellenbosch Local Municipality), Cape Winelands. The estate was started over 300 years ago by Huguenot settlers from France, including Pierre Jourdan, and primarily grows Chardonnay and Pinot noir varietals. The current iteration dates to the 1980s when it was established by the Von Arnim family and the wine cellar and restaurant were remodeled in 2019.
