= Cecile Cilliers =

South African journalist and writer

- Born: 24 May 1933; Franschhoek, South Africa
- Died: 16 June 2018
- Occupations: Writer, journalist

Cecile Cilliers (May 24, 1933 – June 16, 2018) was an Afrikaans freelance journalist and writer.

== Early life and education ==
Anneke Cecile Pretorius was born in Franschhoek in 1933 as the second youngest of four children. The famous author Madeleine van Biljon is one of her sisters. She has another sister, Rouxline (also called Polla), and a brother, Nicholas. Abraham Johannes (Braam) Pretorius, her father (born 10 May 1900 at Rustenburg, was a clerk in the magistrate's office, and her mother is Madeleine Roux. Her father was a Senator and was tallest magistrate in South Africa. As a result of his profession as magistrate, the family moved around a lot.

Cilliers began her schooling in Paarl, after which she went to Johannesburg to Jan Celliers Primary School. Her high school education was at Montagu, where she matriculated. After her matric year, her father was transferred to Johannesburg and she enrolled for a secretarial course at the Technical College. However, she realized that this would not offer her an attractive career. A year later, she joined University of Pretoria where she obtained a B.A. degree in Afrikaans-Dutch, English, German, French and Art History as subjects.

== Career ==
She is predominantly known for her essays, but also published among others a children's collection and a number of religious books. She was involved in the N.G. Kerk and was the first non-ministerial woman to be elected vice-chairperson of the Sinodal Committee. In addition to her performance of the Christian Network Television's Program Focus Point, she also presented the television program Boeksusters on KykNET with her sister, Madeleine van Biljon.

== Awards ==
The Tuks Alumni Association honoured her in 2011 with the Laureate Award. She is also an honorary citizen of Biesies Valley in the Northern Cape.

== Publications ==
Her works include:

Year	Publication
1957	Ek wonder
1992	Kokkewiet op Donderdag
1994	Katswink
1995	Reënboogmense – Reënboogland
1998	Ma's het engelvlerke
1999	Dagboek vir die vrou 2000: 366 dagstukke van opwinding, hoop en verwagting
2001	Begenadigde vroue
2003	Jy's veelkantig, vrou
2004	Jy's veelkantig, vrou
2007	Magspel
2008	Uit sy oorvloed: 365 dagstukke oor God se oorvloedige sorg

== Bibliography ==
- De Vos, Willa. Haar woorde het by ’n tiekie op die tafel begin. Die Voorligter March 1996
- Fourie, Corlia. Om te groet en oor te begin. Rooi Rose, 21 February 1996
- Kannemeyer, J.C. Die Afrikaanse literatuur 1652–2004. Human & Rousseau Cape Town and Pretoria First edition 2005
- Rautenbach, Elmari. Siela en Maad. Insig, January 2001
- Tancred, Elise-Marie. Ons vroue kán dit doen. Rooi Rose, 23 December 1998
- Van Coller, H.P. (red.) Perspektief en Profiel Deel 2. J.L. van Schaik-Uitgewers Pretoria First edition 1999
- Van der Merwe, Lydia. Cecile Cilliers wys haar foto's. Sarie, 26 February 1997
