= Le Quartier Français =

Coordinates: 33°54′45.67″S 19°7′15.23″E

Le Quartier Français is a South African tourist complex located in the heart of Franschhoek village (Cape Winelands District Municipality, Western Cape). It includes a romantic boutique hotel and cottage, two restaurants - Protégé, a casual fine-dining-style eatery, and fine-dining establishment Épice, Everard Read Franschhoek Art Gallery, and the Great Heart Wine Boutique.

== See also ==
- List of hotels in South Africa
