= Franschhoek =

Town in Western Cape Province, South Africa

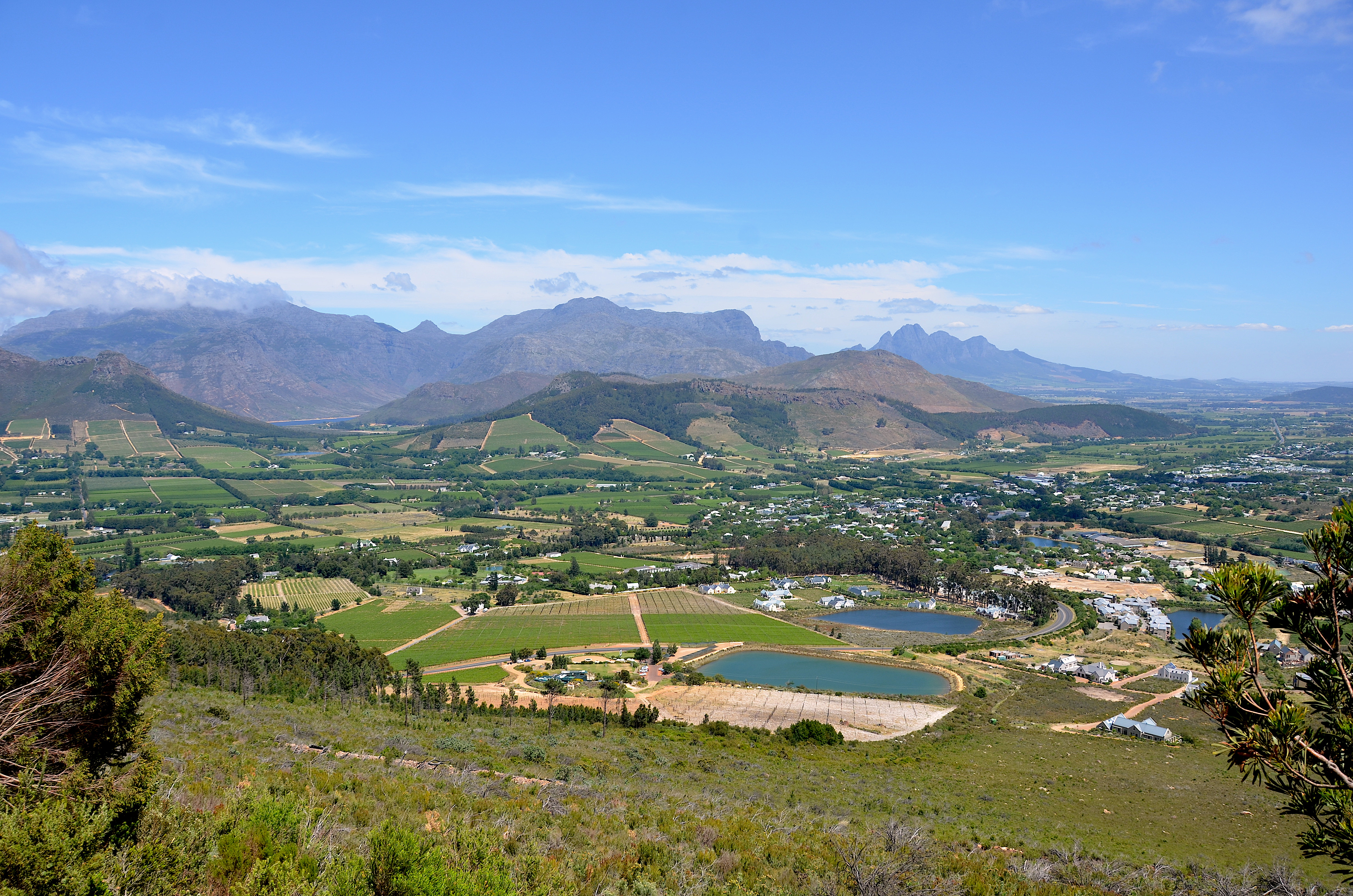
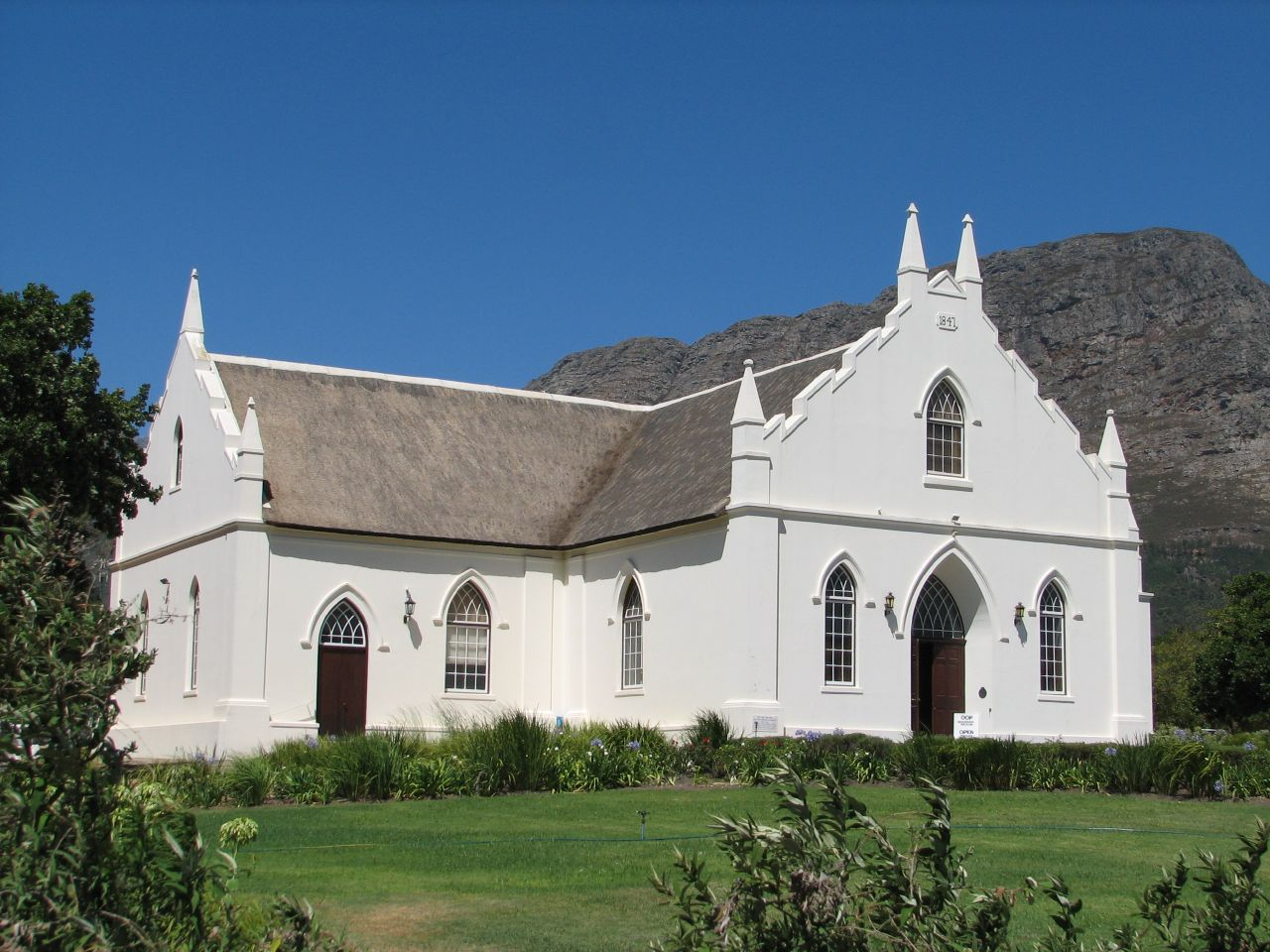
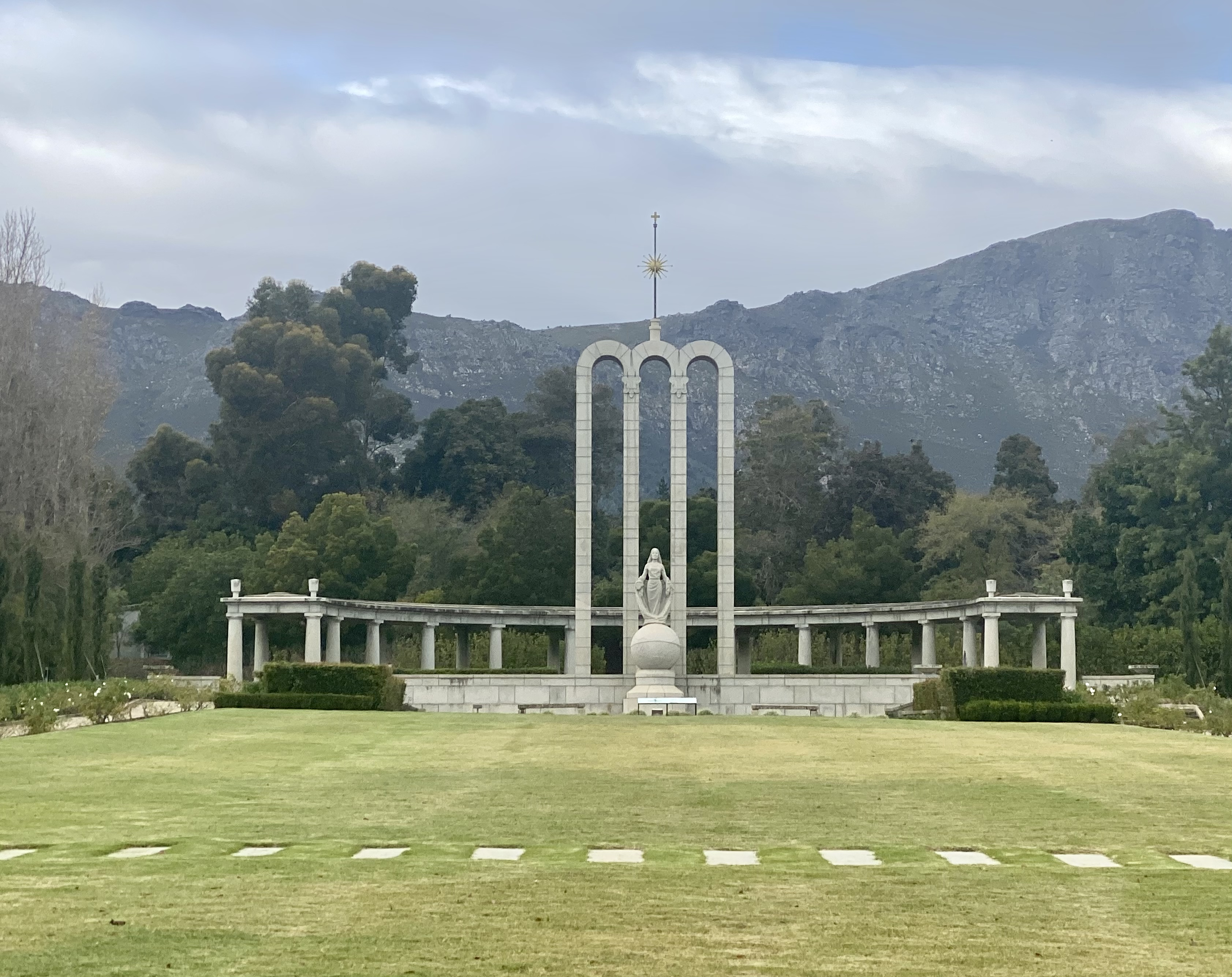
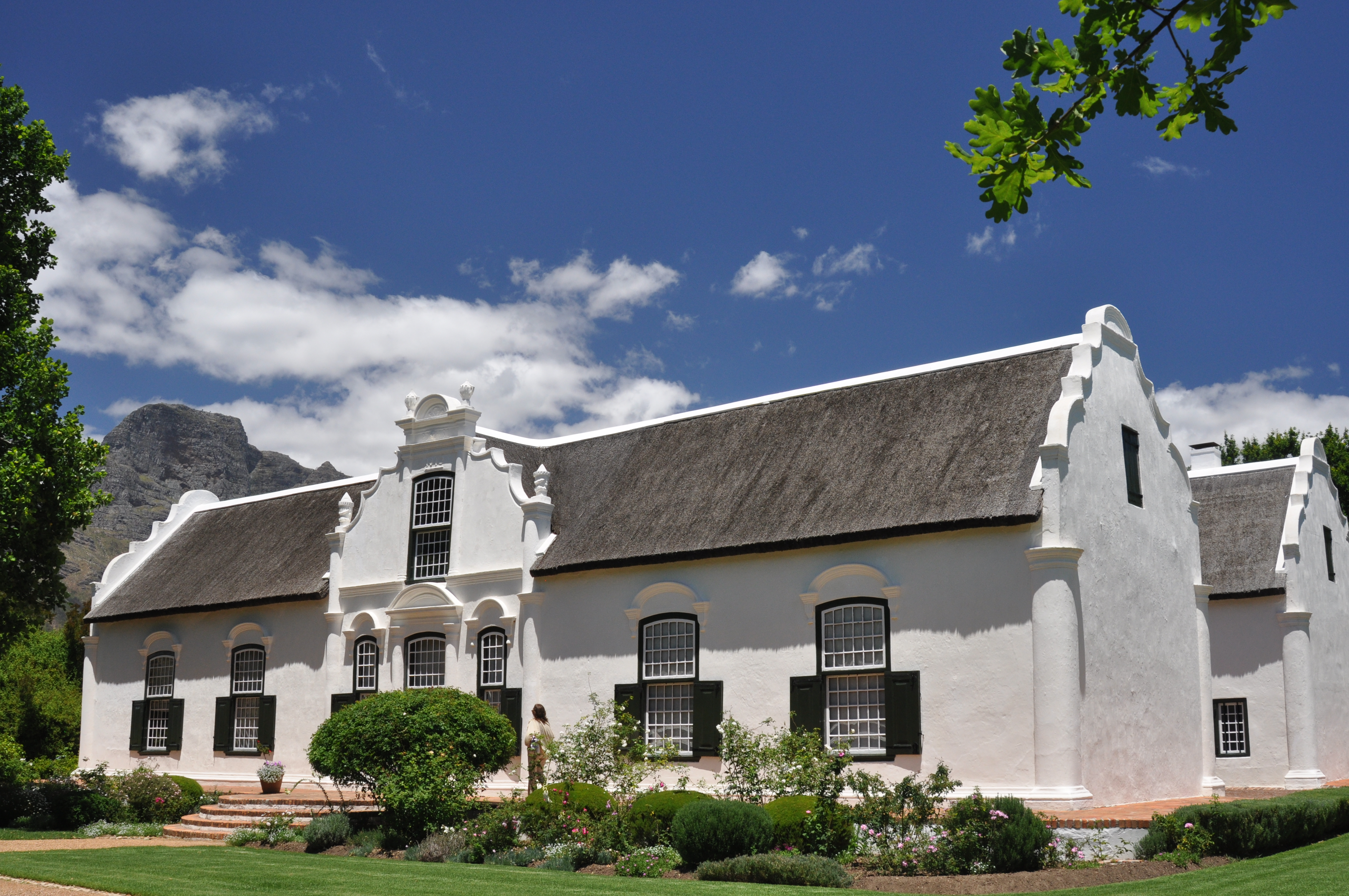
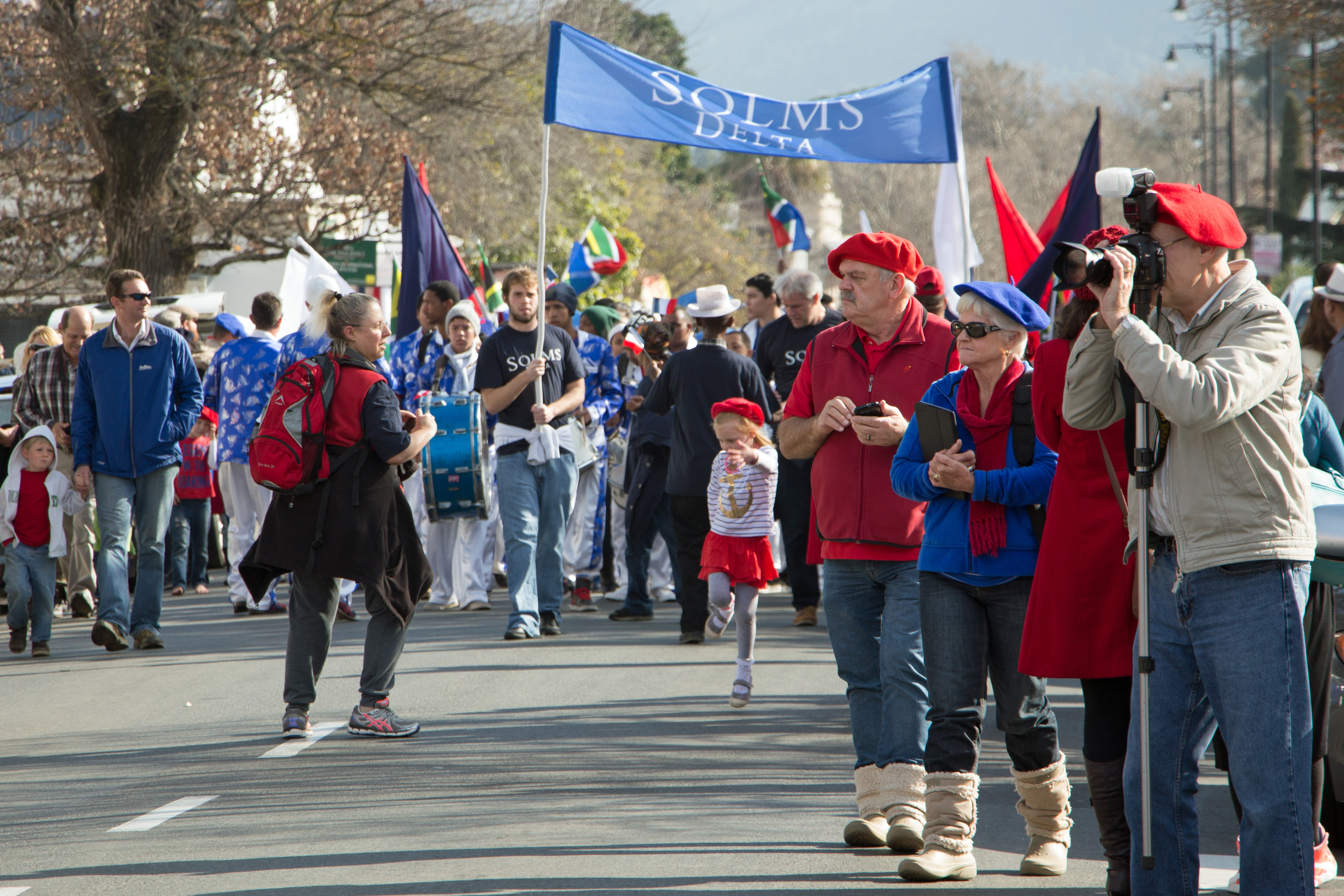
- Clockwise from top: Franschhoek Pass, the Huguenot Monument, Huguenot Museum, Bastille Festival, Boschendal Estate, Dutch Reformed Church, Franschhoek

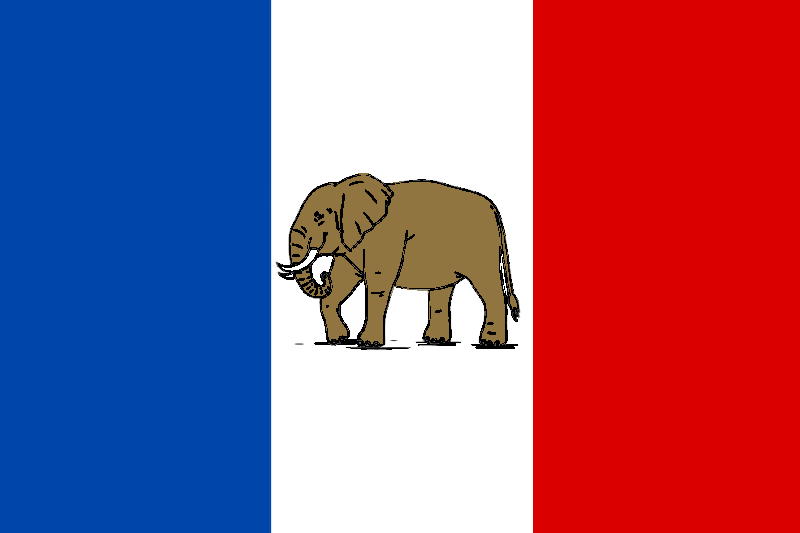
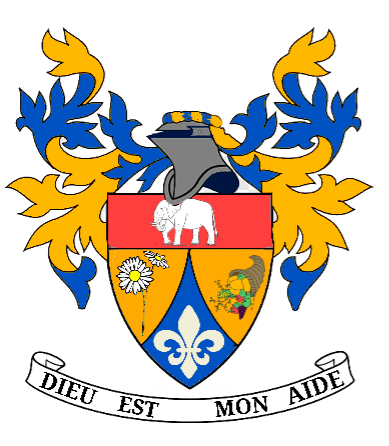
- Flag Coat of arms
- Motto(s): Dieu Est Mon Aide (French: God is My Helper)
- Location within Western Cape Location within South Africa Location within Africa
- Coordinates: 33°55′S 19°08′E
- Country: South Africa
- Province: Western Cape
- District: Cape Winelands
- Municipality: Stellenbosch
- First Settled: 1688

Government
  - Councillor: Reginald Pheiffer and Wilemina Prins (DA)

Area
  - Total: 1.8 km^{2} (0.69 sq mi)

Population (2011)
  - Total: 1,066
  - Density: 590/km^{2} (1,500/sq mi)

Racial makeup (2011)
  - White: 76.8%
  - Black African: 15.5%
  - Coloured: 6.2%
  - Indian/Asian: 0.5%
  - Other: 1.0%

First languages (2011)
  - English: 44.1%
  - Afrikaans: 43.8%
  - Xhosa: 1.6%
  - Sotho: 0.5%
  - Other: 10.0%
- Time zone: UTC+2 (SAST)
- Postal code (street): 7690
- PO box: 7690
- Area code: 021

Franschhoek ([fransˈɦuk]; Afrikaans for "French Corner", Dutch spelling before 1947 Fransche Hoek, French: Le Coin Français) is a small town in the Western Cape Province and one of the oldest towns in South Africa. It was formerly known as Oliphants hoek (as there were vast groups of elephants roaming the valley). It is situated about 75 kilometres (47 mi) from Cape Town, a 45-minute drive away. The whole area, including townships such as Groendal and suburbs such as Wemmershoek, has a population of slightly over 20,000 people while the town proper, known as Hugenote, has a population of around 1,000. Since 2000, it has been incorporated into Stellenbosch Municipality.

== History ==
Franschhoek's original inhabitants are the Khoisan peoples. They are now mostly extinct, but their descendants continue to live in the area as mixed race (Khoisan and French/Dutch) people, who are now known as "Coloured people" and "Cape Coloureds". In 1685, King Louis XIV banned Protestantism in France. Hundreds of French Huguenots were forced to flee their country. In 1688, almost 300 French Huguenots arrived at the Cape of Good Hope by ship and were given the Franschhoek Valley to settle.

The French Huguenot refugees populated the valley, establishing farms and businesses, bringing with them their French culture and experience in agriculture. The name of the area soon changed to le Coin Français ("the French Corner"), and later to Franschhoek (Dutch for "French Corner"), with many of the settlers naming their new farms after the areas they had left behind in France. La Motte, Champagne, La Cotte, Cabrière, La Provence, Bourgogne, La Terra de Luc and La Dauphine were among some of the first established farms — most of which still retain their original Cape Dutch farm houses today. These farms have grown into renowned wineries. Many of the surnames in the area are of French origin, e.g. Theron, Du Toit, Marais, Du Plessis, Malan, Malherbe, and Joubert. The French settlers tried fiercely to hold onto their language, but were forced over generations by the Dutch and British colonialists through schooling to integrate into local society.

This heritage is shown today by the Huguenot Monument which stands at the end of the town. The nearby Huguenot Memorial Museum adjacent to the monument explores the history of the French Huguenots who settled in the Cape, and especially in the Franschhoek Valley. On exhibition are the various tools they used to make wine, the clothes they wore, and interpretation of their culture and goals.

The Cape Dutch architecture in much of the village is unspoiled, as restrictions have been placed on the extent of renovations and new construction in order to preserve the spirit of the original French settlers to the area.

In 1904, a 28 km (17 mi) branch line was built between Paarl and Franschhoek to serve as an alternative to ox-drawn carts for farmers wanting to get their produce to market. Steam locomotives operated along the route until diesel locomotives took over in the 1970s and then, in the 1990s, as the need for rail transport decreased, service along the railway line was discontinued. The branch line was reinstated in 2012 by a private operator and now sees service as the Franschhoek Wine Tram, a tourism project utilizing newly constructed double-decker trams modeled after the Blackpool Corporation Tramway's Double Deck Balcony Tramcar of circa 1923 to transport tourists between wine estates in the area.

== Economy and culture ==
Franschhoek is a tourist town. The Tasting Room restaurant and the Haute Cabrière vineyard are both in Franschhoek. The English-medium private Bridge House School was constructed outside the village.

Franschhoek's weekend Bastille Festival has been celebrated every July since 1994, the year of the first South African general election with universal adult suffrage marking the end of the apartheid era.

== International relations ==
Franschhoek is a twin town or sister city of:

- Dilbeek, Belgium

== Climate ==
Franschoek features a hot-summer Mediterranean climate (Köppen: Csa), with warm, dry summers and mild to cool, wet winters. The climate exhibits more continentality than nearby Cape Town due to its inland valley position and proximity to mountainous terrain, yielding comparably lower winter minima and higher summer maxima.

Climate data for Franschoek, Western Cape, South Africa
Month	Jan	Feb	Mar	Apr	May	Jun	Jul	Aug	Sep	Oct	Nov	Dec	Year
Mean daily maximum °C (°F)	29 (84)	30 (86)	27 (81)	25 (77)	22 (72)	19 (66)	18 (64)	19 (66)	21 (70)	24 (75)	26 (79)	27 (81)	24 (75)
Mean daily minimum °C (°F)	18 (64)	17 (63)	16 (61)	13 (55)	11 (52)	9 (48)	8 (46)	9 (48)	10 (50)	13 (55)	14 (57)	16 (61)	13 (55)
Average rainfall mm (inches)	20 (0.8)	10 (0.4)	35 (1.4)	35 (1.4)	89 (3.5)	143 (5.6)	109 (4.3)	152 (6.0)	46 (1.8)	27 (1.1)	29 (1.1)	21 (0.8)	716 (28.2)
Source: Weatherandclimate.co.uk

== Gallery ==
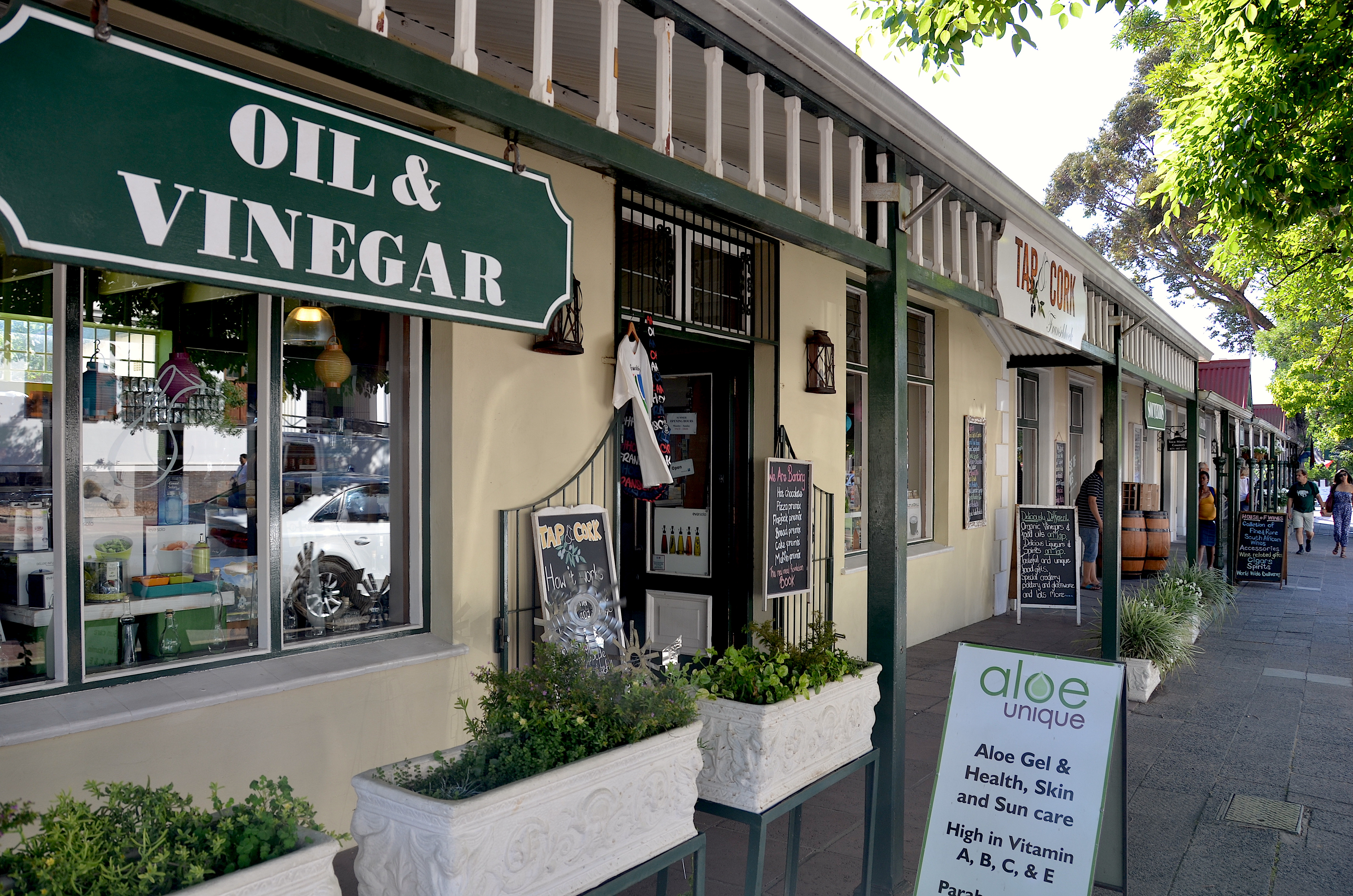
Franschhoek October 2015

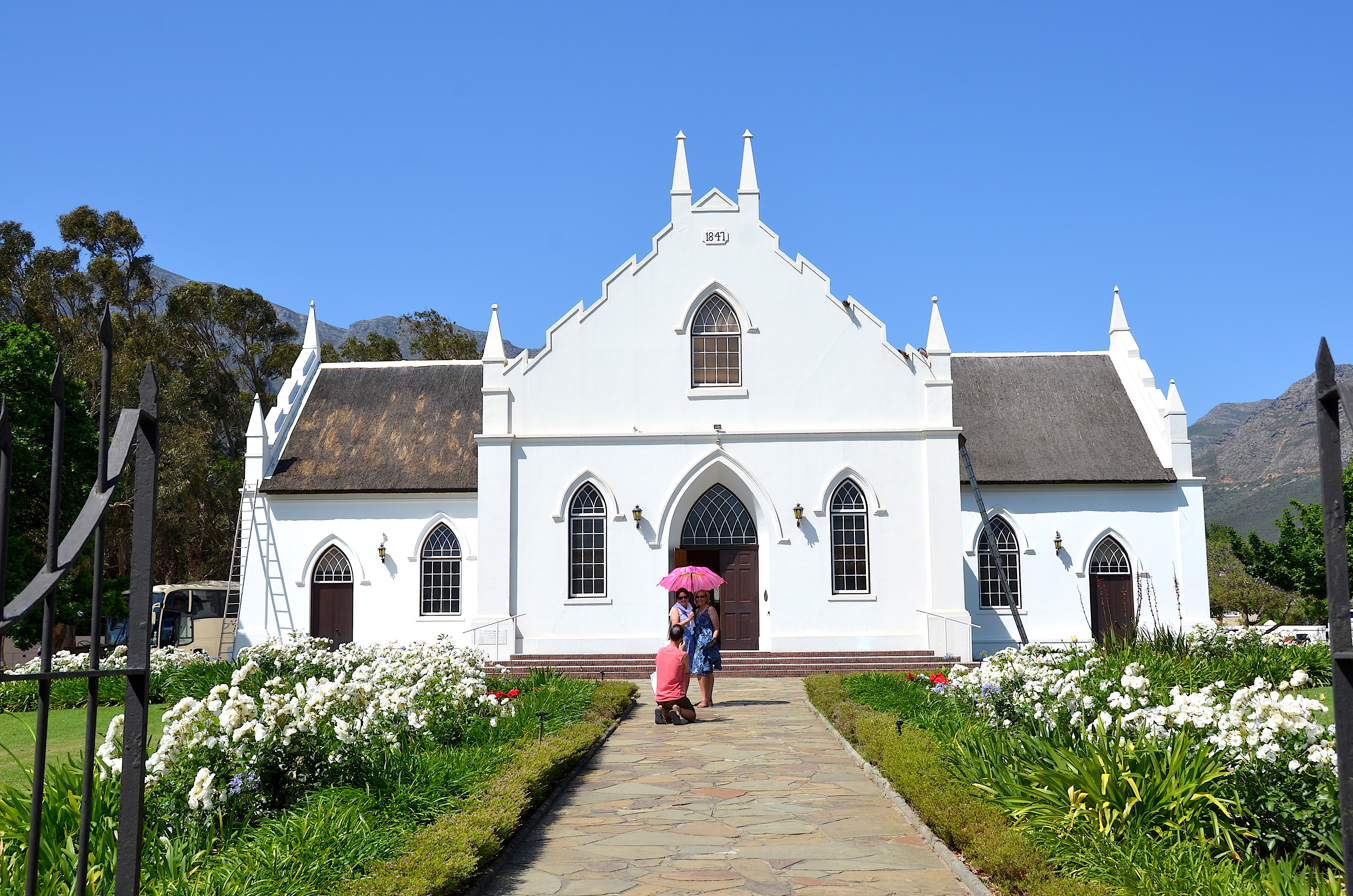
Dutch Reformed Church, Franschhoek

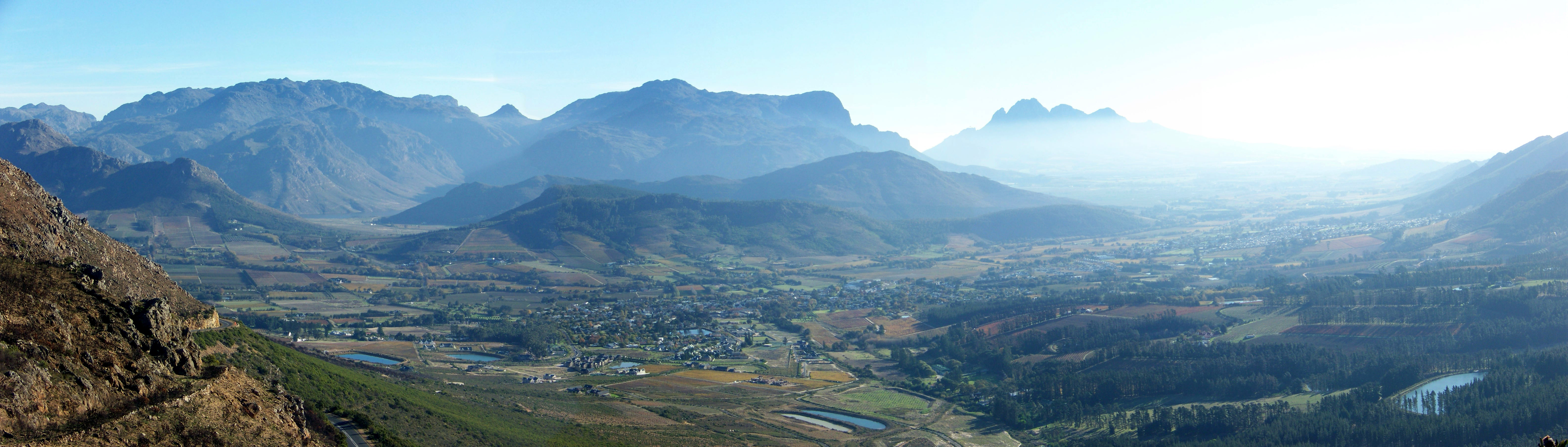
Franschhoek and Berg River Valley from Franschhoek Pass

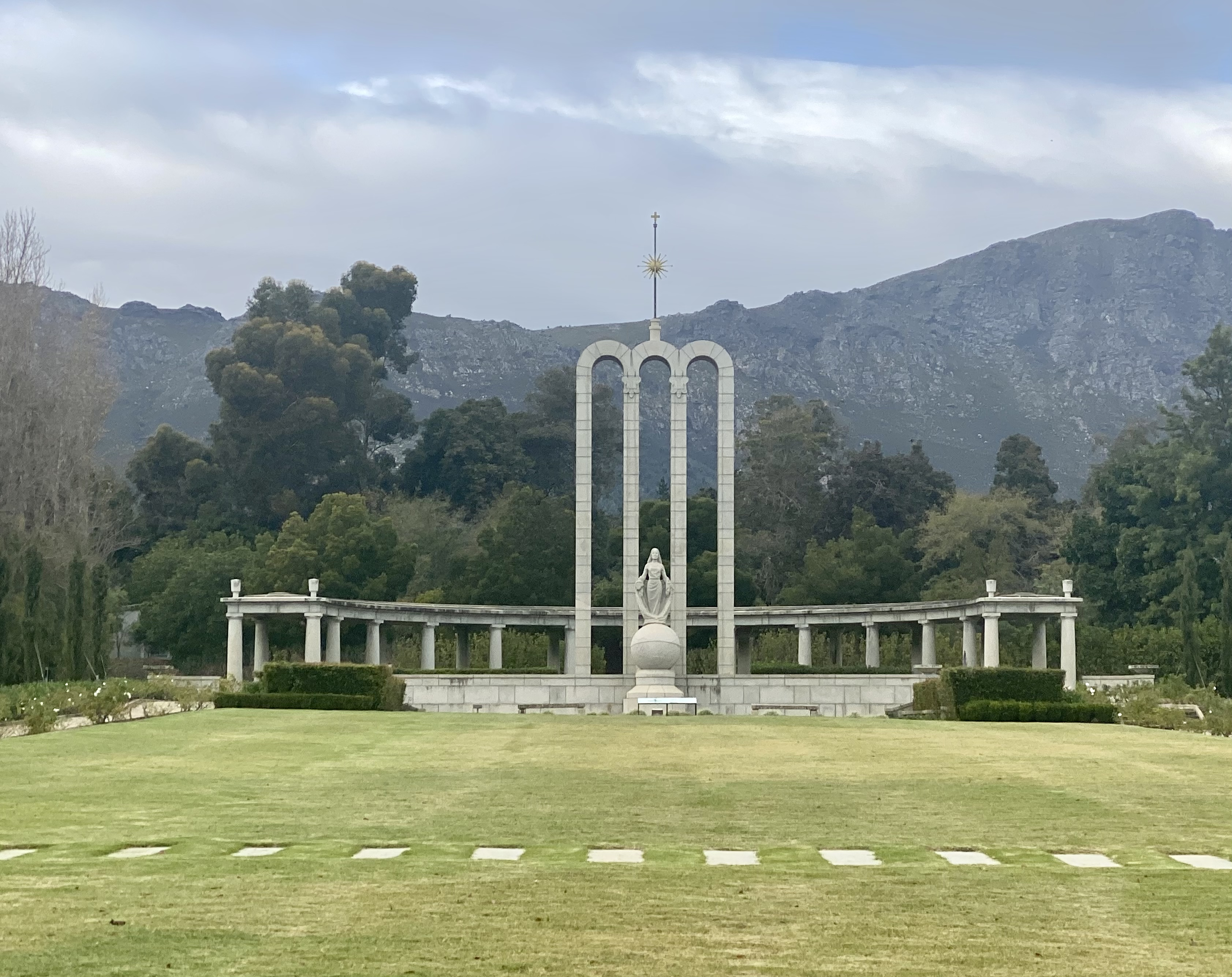

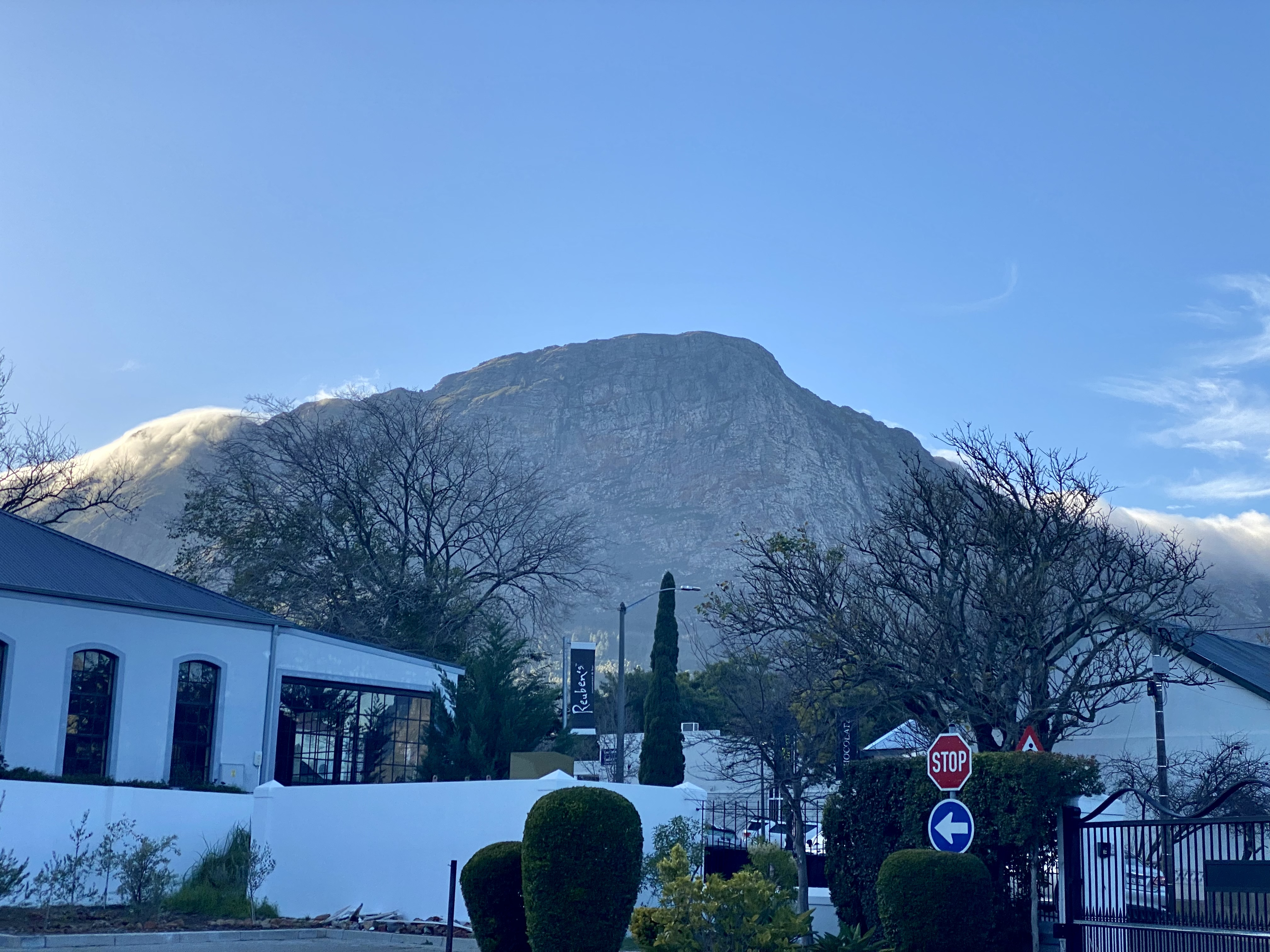

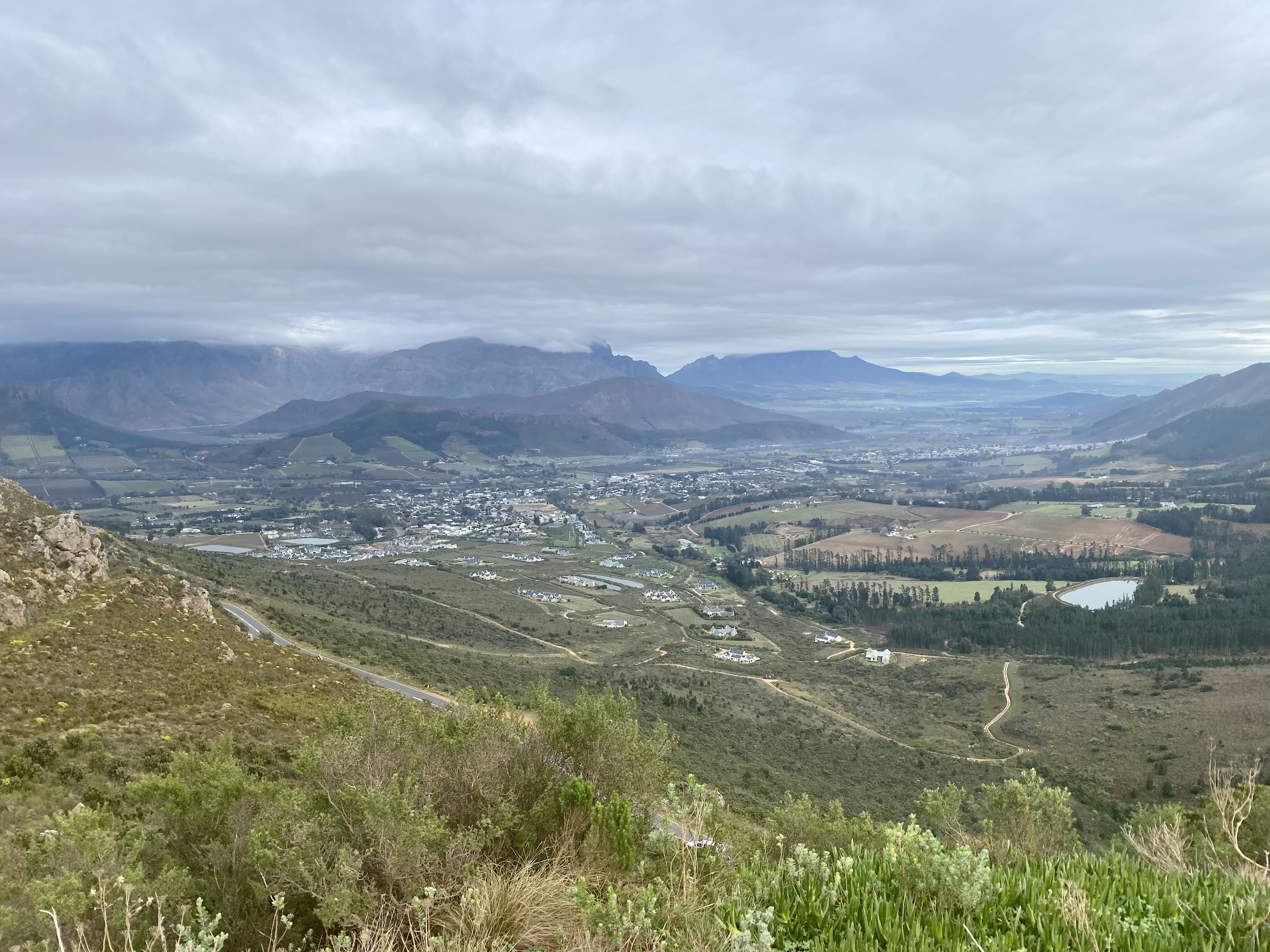

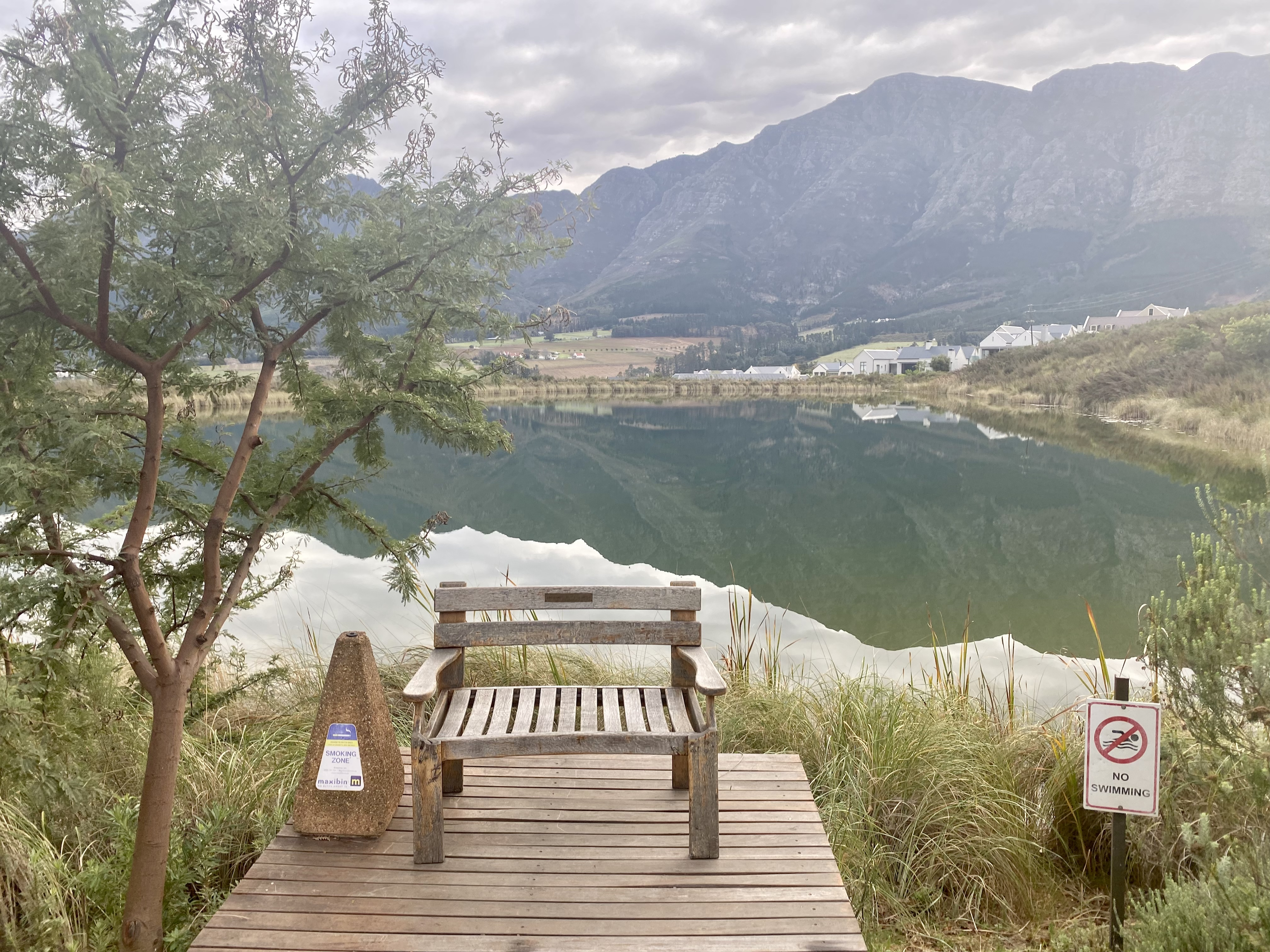

== Notable residents ==
- Pieter Daniel Rossouw (1845–1896), pastor and Afrikaans language writer.
- Hendrik Johannes van der Bijl (1887–1948), South African electrical engineer and industrialist.
- George Daneel (1904–2004), South African rugby player.
- Cecile Cilliers (1933–2018), Afrikaans freelance journalist and writer.
- Vito Roberto Palazzolo (1947), Italian businessman and alleged mafia member.
- Mark Solms (1961), South African psychoanalyst and neuropsychologist.
- Margot Janse (1969), chef.
- Reuben Riffel (1974), South African celebrity chef, restaurateur and media personality.

== See also ==
- Boschendal
- Huguenots in South Africa
- Dutch Reformed Church, Franschhoek
