= Johannesburg City Parks and Zoo =

Government entity responsible for Johannesburg's greenspaces

- Company type: Section 21, Association not-for-gain
- Industry: Environmental management Habitat conservation Conservation biology
- Founded: November 2000; 25 years ago
- Headquarters: Johannesburg, South Africa
- Key people: Bukelwa Njingolo, Acting Managing Director
- Revenue: ▲ R 1 216 101 000 (2022); R 1 152 652 000 (2021)
- Total assets: ▲ R 5 046 000 (2022); R 4 593 000 (2021)
- Website: jhbcityparksandzoo.com

Johannesburg City Parks and Zoo (JCPZ) is a not-for-gain company established under Section 21 of the South African Companies Act and wholly owned by the City of Johannesburg.

It is tasked with the maintenance of burial grounds, parks, green areas, wetlands and trees around Johannesburg.

== History ==
In 2011, Johannesburg City Parks underwent a restructuring to merge with Johannesburg Zoo; in January 2013, it became Johannesburg City Parks and Zoo.

== Major Johannesburg Parks ==
- Johannesburg Botanical Garden, Emmarentia
- Civic Gardens
- Country View
- Delta Park, Blairgowrie
- Diepkloof Park
- Diepsloot Park
- Dorothy Nyembe Park
- Florida Lake
- Golden Harvest, Northwold
- Innisfree Park
- Ivory Park
- James & Ethel Gray Park
- Joubert Park
- Kremetart Park
- Mofolo Park
- Mountain Road Park
- Oppenheimer Tower
- Orlando West Park
- Phineas Macintosh
- Rhodes Park
- River Park
- Robyn Park
- Rose Park, Lenasia
- Thokoza Park, Soweto
- Wilgeheuwel XtremePark
- Zoo Lake
- Pioneers' Park / Wemmer Pan, Rosettenville

== Major nature reserves and bird sanctuaries ==
- Klipriviersberg Nature Reserve
- Kloofendal Nature Reserve, Roodepoort
- Melville Koppies Nature Reserve
- Rietfontein Nature Reserve
- The Wilds Municipal Nature Reserve, Houghton

== Cemeteries ==
- Alexandra East Bank Cemetery
- Alexandra Marlboro Cemetery
- Alexandra West Bank
- Avalon Cemetery
- Braamfontein Cemetery & Crematorium
- Brixton Cemetery
- Davidsonville
- Diepsloot Cemetery
- Dobsonville Cemetery
- Doornkop Cemetery
- Eldorado Park Cemetery
- Ennerdale Cemetery No. 1
- Ennerdale Cemetery No. 2
- Fairland Cemetery
- Ferndale Randburg Cemetery
- Finetown (Grasmere) Cemetery
- Florida Cemetery
- Hamburg Cemetery
- Horizon View Cemetery
- Lenasia Cemetery & Crematoria
- LeRoux Cemetery
- Maraisburg Cemetery
- Midrand Cemetery
- Nancefield (Klipspruit) Cemetery
- New Roodepoort Cemetery
- Newclare Cemetery
- Old Roodepoort Cemetery
- Panorama Cemetery
- Riverlea Cemetery
- Roodepoort Muslim and Hindu Cemetery
- Waterval Cemetery
- Weltevreden Park
- Westpark Cemetery

== Champion Trees ==
There are 5 Champion Trees overseen by JCPZ:

- Wits Campus Tree
- Northcliff Oak
- The Parktown Tree
- Ruth Fischer Tree
- Sophiatown Oak (delisted)

== See also ==
- Protected areas of South Africa
- Huddle Park, Linksfield
- Alberts Farm, Albertskroon
- Walter Sisulu National Botanical Garden, Roodepoort
