= Huguenot Monument =

Monument in Franschhoek, South Africa

- Interactive map of Huguenot Monument
- Location: Franschhoek, South Africa
- Completion date: 1945
- Opening date: 17 April 1948

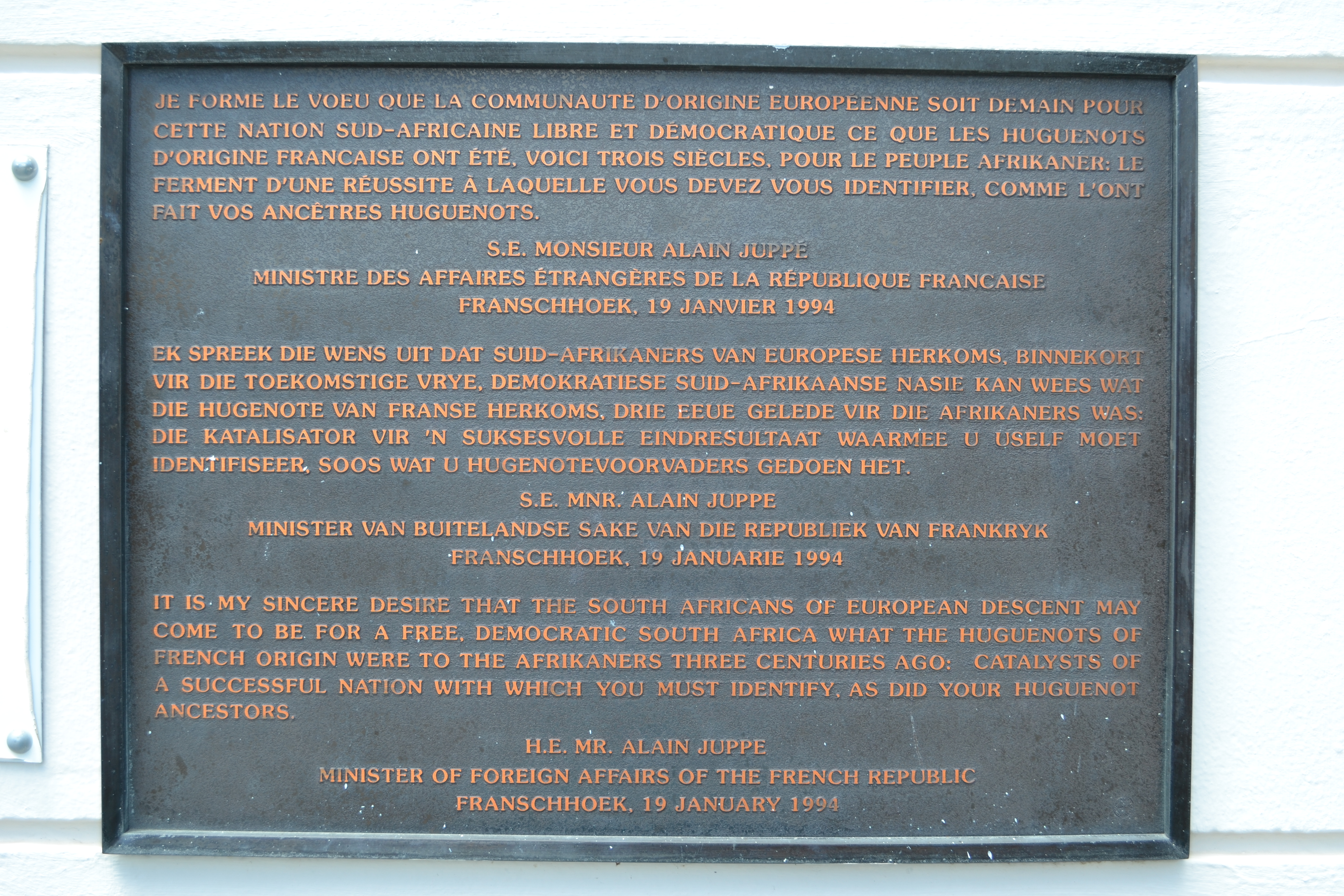
Plaque erected in 1994

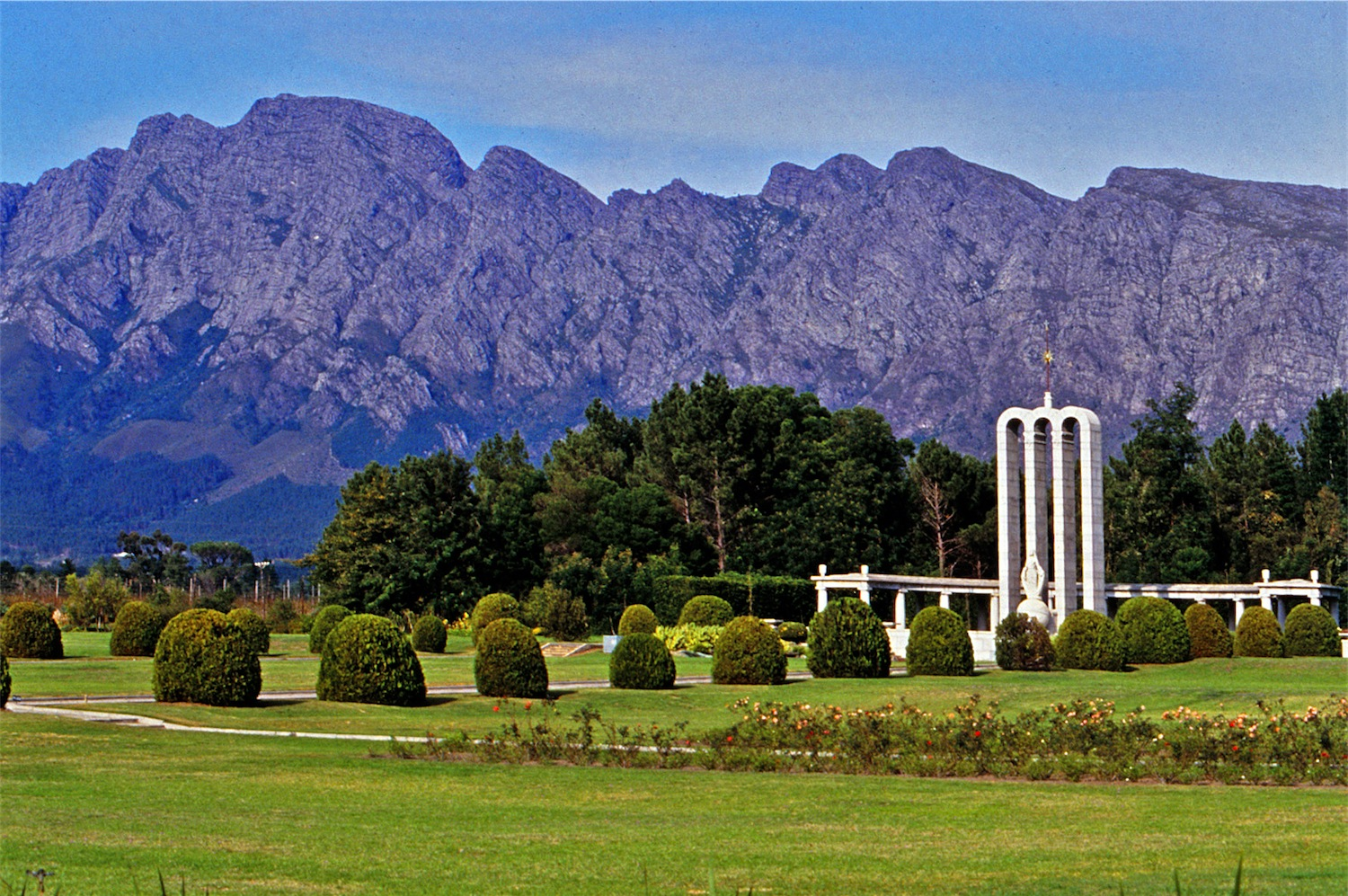
Huguenot Monument and grounds

The Huguenot Monument in Franschhoek, Western Cape, South Africa, is dedicated to the cultural influences that Huguenots have brought to the Cape Colony (and ultimately the whole of South Africa) after their immigration during the 17th and 18th centuries. These French and Belgian Protestants were fleeing violent religious persecution, especially in Roman Catholic France.

The monument was designed by J.C. Jongens, completed in 1945, and inaugurated by Dr. A.J. van der Merwe on 17 April 1948.

The three high arches symbolize the Holy Trinity: the Father, Son and Holy Spirit. On top of the arches is the sun of righteousness and above that, the Huguenot cross of their Christian faith.

The central female figure, created by Coert Steynberg, personifies religious freedom, holding a bible in one hand and a broken chain in the other. She is casting off her cloak of oppression. Her position on top of the globe shows her spiritual freedom and parallels some representations of the Virgin Mary in Roman Catholic iconography, which depict her with one foot resting on the globe. The fleur-de-lis on the woman's robe represents noble spirit and character; it also was long the chief symbol of the French monarchy, still in power at the time of the Huguenot exodus.

The southern tip of the globe shows symbols relating to the Huguenots: the Bible, for their faith; a harp, for their art and culture; a sheaf of corn and a grape vine, representing agriculture and viticulture; and a silk and cloth weavers' spinning wheel, representing their industry.

The water pond, reflecting the colonnade behind it, expresses the undisturbed tranquility of mind and spiritual peace which the Huguenots refugees gained in South Africa after having experienced deadly religious persecution in France.

The Huguenot Memorial Museum adjacent to the monument explores the history of the French Huguenots who settled in the Cape, and especially in the Franschhoek Valley. On exhibition are the various tools they used to make wine, clothes they wore, and interpretation of their culture and goals.

Also on the site are wine cellars joined by a colonnade bearing the words Post Tenebras Lux ("After darkness, light" in Latin). A motto of Protestants during the Reformation, the phrase was first inscribed on the Reformation Wall in Geneva, Switzerland, which is dedicated to the Protestant Reformation.

== Other Huguenot monuments and memorials in South Africa ==
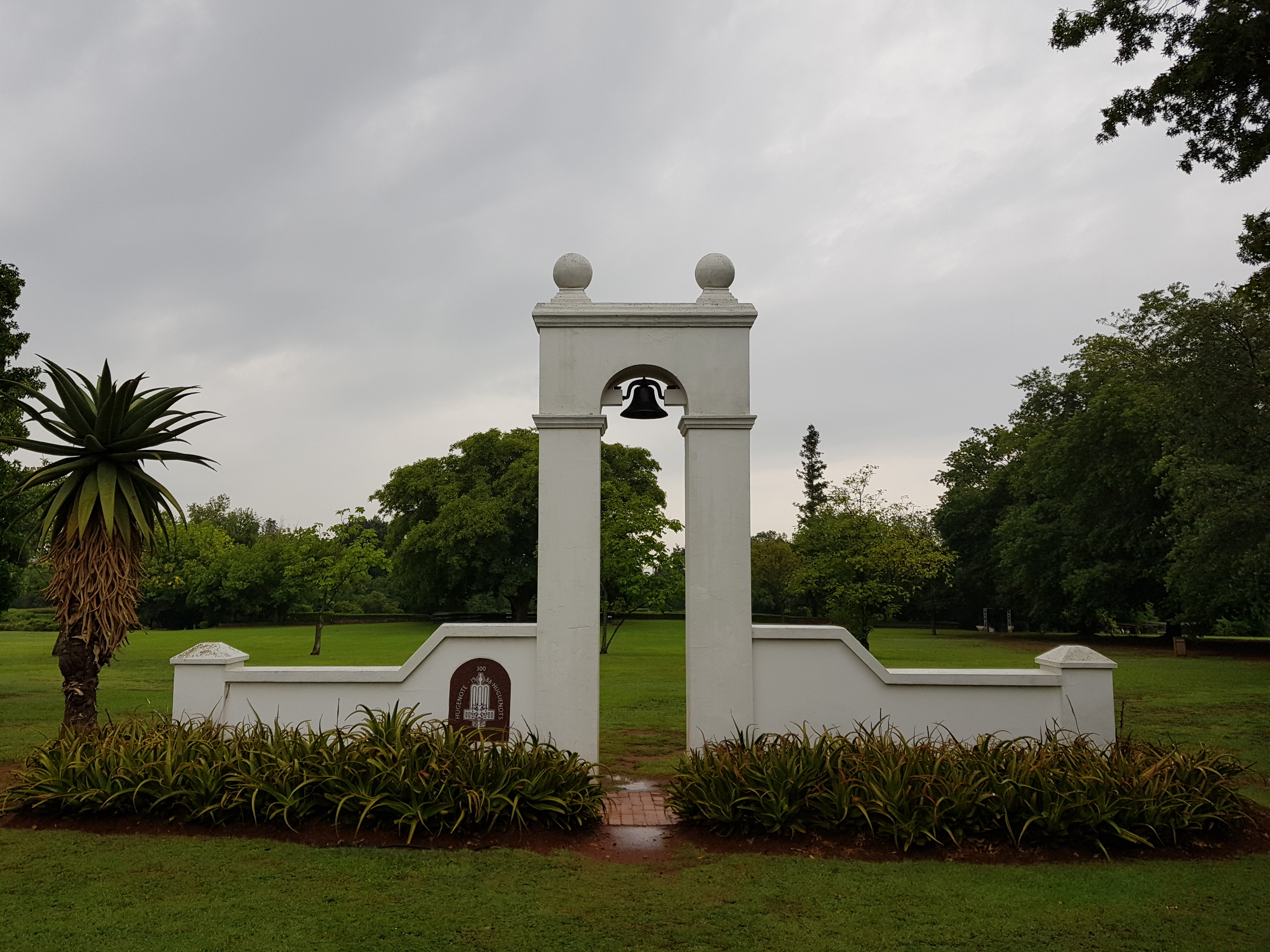
the Huguenot Monument in the Johannesburg Botanical Garden was erected in 1988, to commemorate the 300th anniversary of the arrival of the Huguenots in South Africa.

- In the Johannesburg Botanical Garden stands a memorial commemorating the 300th anniversary of the arrival of the Huguenots in South Africa.
- Joubert Square of Wellington, Western Cape, has a Huguenot Fountain.
- On Queen Victoria Street, Cape Town, stands the Huguenot Memorial Building, erected by the Huguenot Memorial Society. The remains of President Kruger lay in state here before being taken to the Netherlands for burial.

== See also ==
- Huguenots in South Africa
