= Delta Park (Johannesburg) =

Park in Gauteng, South Africa

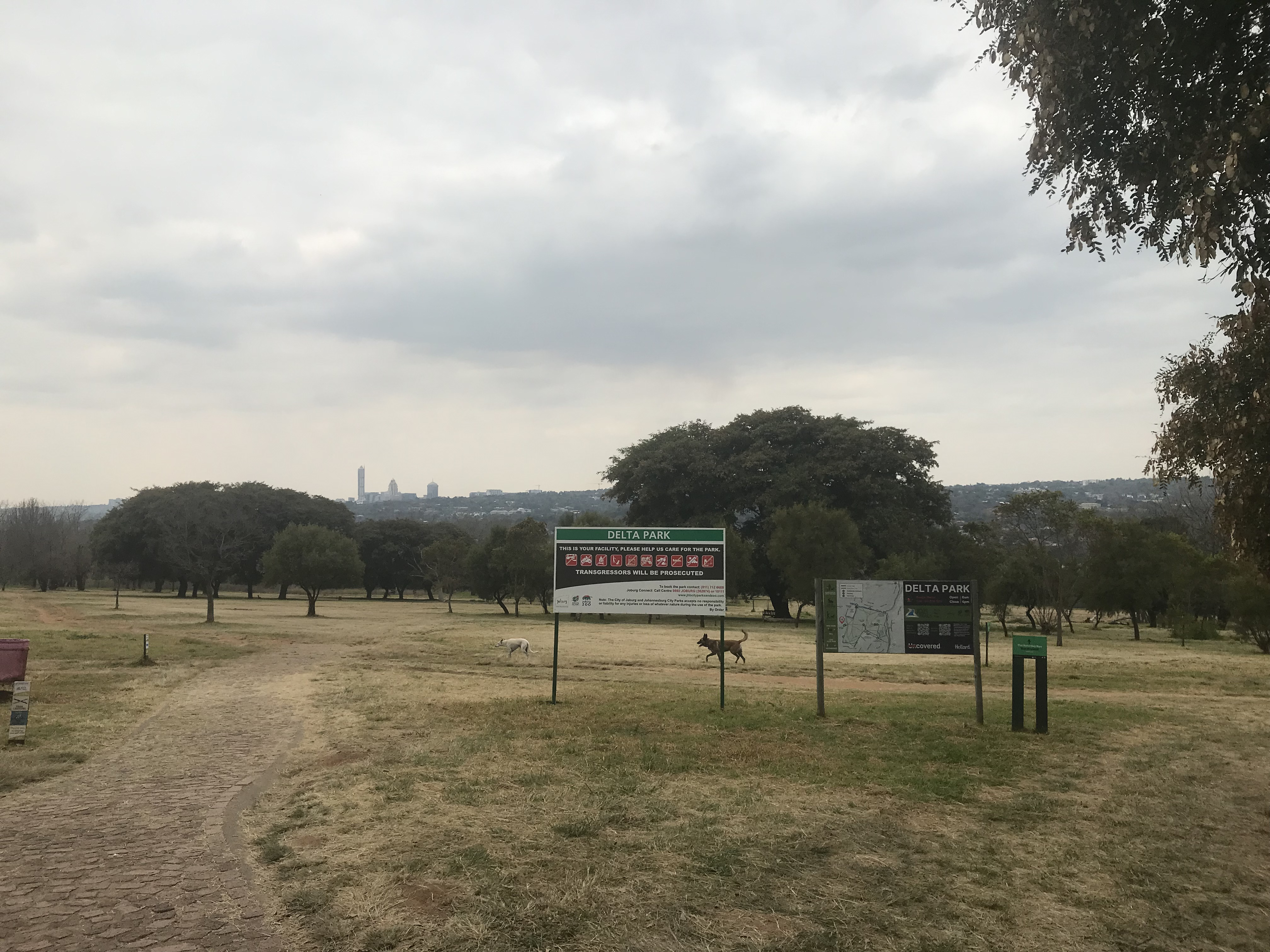
- Car park - the view, with Sandton in the distance
- Interactive map of Delta Park
- Type: Inner city park
- Location: Craighall Road, Victory Park, Randburg, Gauteng
- Nearest city: Johannesburg
- Coordinates: 26°7′24″S 28°0′30″E
- Area: 104 hectares (260 acres)
- Created: 1963
- Operator: Johannesburg City Parks and Zoo
- Open: All year
- Species: 180 birds species
- Parking: Craighall Road, Victory Park; Cnr. of Pitcairn Road and Penelope Avenue
- Website: www.jhbcityparksandzoo.com/services-facilities/parks/find-a-park/delta-park

Delta Park is one of the biggest parks in Randburg, Johannesburg, South Africa. It is adjacent to the suburbs of Blairgowrie and Victory Park. It comprises 108 hectares of grassland and woodland, and three tree-lined dams. It has walking trails, a "sensory trail" and bird watching hides. It incorporates the Florence Bloom Bird Sanctuary and the Delta Environmental Centre. The latter offers wildlife-related courses to adults and children, including holiday programmes; about 20 000 children take part in the programmes every year.

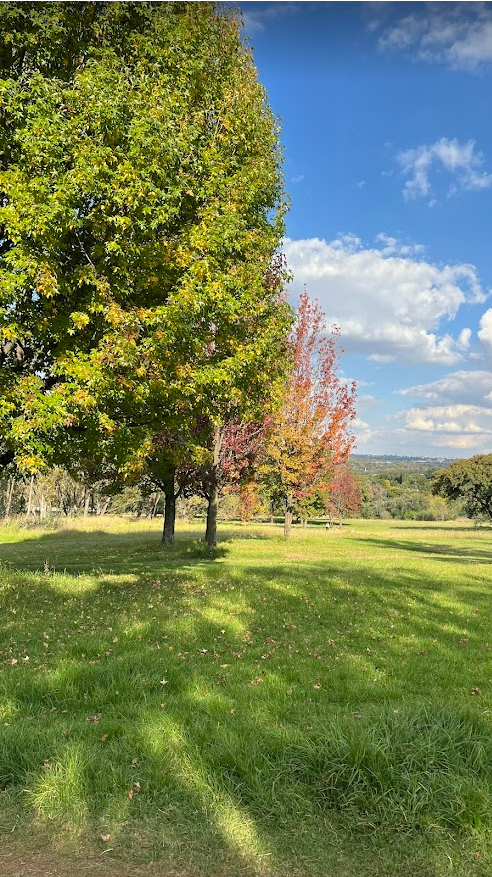
Delta Park

== See also ==
- Emmarentia Dam
- Johannesburg City Parks
