= Huguenots in South Africa =

French South Africans
Sud-africains français; Franse Suid-Afrikaners
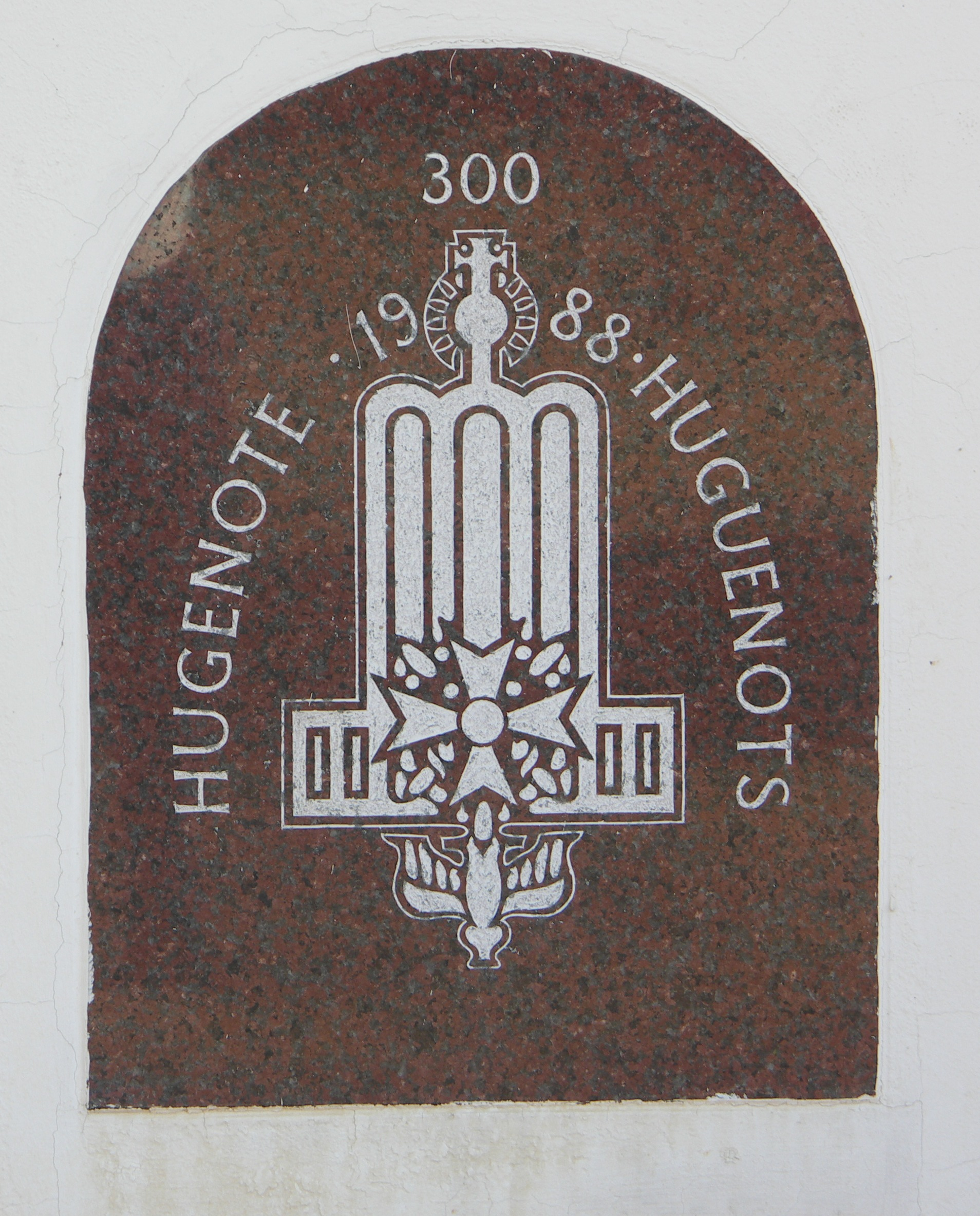
- Commemorating 300 years of Huguenot history in South Africa

Regions with significant populations
- Western Cape · Gauteng · Free State · Limpopo

Languages
- Afrikaans

Religion
- Christianity (mainly Calvinism)

Related ethnic groups
- French Canadians (Québécois), Afrikaners, Walloons, Cajuns, Caledonians, French, Louisiana Creoles, Pieds-Noirs, Romands

Many people of European heritage in South Africa are descended from Huguenots. The Huguenots were French Protestants who belonged to the Calvinist Reformed Church, established in 1550. After facing persecution in France for decades, their situation worsened on October 22, 1685, when King Louis XIV issued the Edict of Fontainebleau. This edict revoked the Edict of Nantes which had previously granted them the right to practice their faith, and it outlawed Protestantism, leading to large-scale persecution. Most Huguenots who came to South Africa originally settled in the Dutch Cape Colony, but were subsequently absorbed into the Afrikaner and Afrikaans-speaking population due to religious similarities with the Dutch colonists.

== Background and early arrivals ==
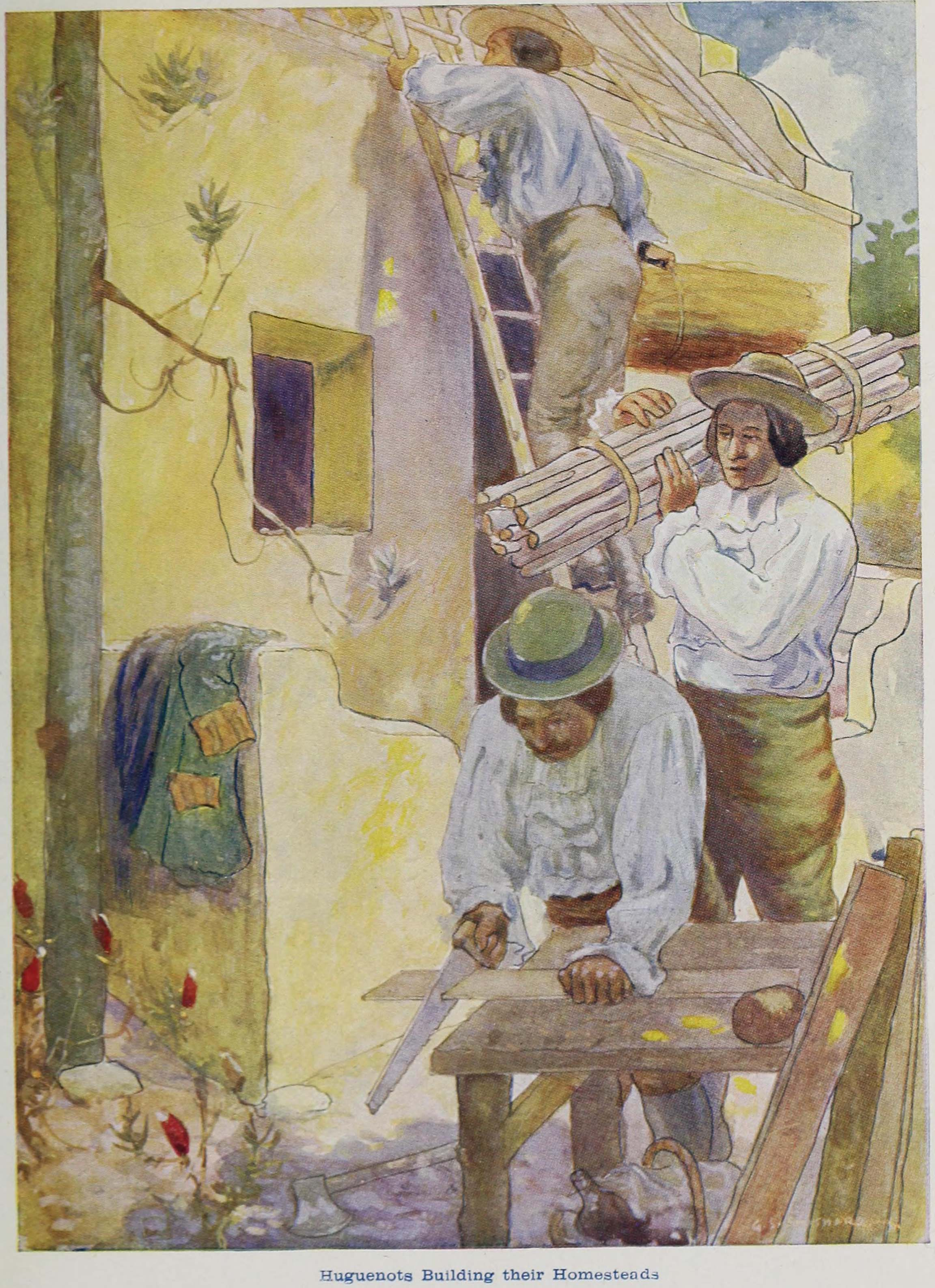
Huguenots building their homesteads

On October 3, 1685, even before the official revocation of the Edict of Nantes, the directors of the Dutch East India Company (VOC) decided to send Huguenot refugees to the Cape of Good Hope. The decision was motivated by two factors: the Netherlands was experiencing an influx of French refugees, and the VOC sought to increase the number of colonists at the Cape to manage agricultural affairs and cattle-dealing. The Huguenots were considered ideal settlers because they shared the Calvinist faith with the Dutch and many were highly trained craftsmen or experienced farmers, with particular skills in viticulture and oenology (winemaking).

Even before this organized emigration, individual Huguenots had arrived at the Cape. The first was reportedly Francois Villion (later Viljoen) in October 1671. He was followed by others, including Jean de Long (de Lange) in 1685 and the brothers Guillaume and Francois du Toit in 1686. The wife of governor Jan van Riebeeck, Maria de la Quellerie, was also a Huguenot who arrived in 1652, though she and her husband left for Batavia after ten years.

== The great emigration of 1688–1689 ==
Between 1688 and 1689, a total of 180 Huguenots from France and 18 Walloons from present-day Belgium settled at the Cape. By 1692, the number of French Huguenots who had settled in the colony reached 201. Individual families continued to arrive until the first quarter of the 18th century, with state-subsidised emigration officially ending in 1706.

== Settlement and integration policy ==
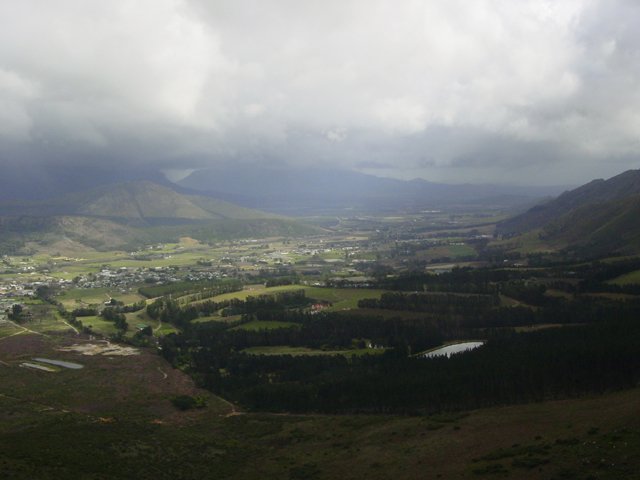
Franschhoek Valley

The Governor of the Cape, Simon van der Stel, designated lands for the Huguenots in areas that would become known as Franschhoek ('French Corner') and Drakenstein (present-day Paarl). However, he gave specific orders to intersperse the French settlers among the Dutch-speaking burghers. Van der Stel's stated reason for this policy was "that they could learn our language and morals, and be integrated with the Dutch nation". He also feared they might "get up to mischief if war broke out again in Europe".

The Huguenots were initially settled in the Berg River Valley, but many found better soil in an isolated valley called Olifantshoek ('Elephant's Corner') due to the elephant herds that roamed there. In 1694, nine farms were allocated to French settlers in this valley, which was subsequently renamed Franschhoek. Many farms were established along the Berg and Franschhoek rivers, as well as in the Dwars River Valley. Settlers often named their new farms after the areas in France from which they came, with names like La Motte, Provence, and Chamonix still in use today.

== Religious leadership ==
To serve the French-speaking community, the VOC sent the minister Pierre Simond, who arrived on August 29, 1688. He was stationed at Drakenstein and preached in both Drakenstein and Stellenbosch. On November 20, 1689, Simond led a deputation to Governor van der Stel to request their own congregation, which was granted. A church building was established in 1691 near the present-day church in Simondium. Simond also undertook literary work, publishing a French verse translation of the Psalms titled Les Veilles Afriquaines. The book was published in Amsterdam in 1704 and is considered by some to be the first book written in South Africa.

== Economic and agricultural impact ==
The Huguenots had a transformative and lasting impact on the Cape's economy, particularly its wine industry. While wine production had begun in 1659, it was only after the Huguenots settled at the Cape between 1680 and 1690 that the industry began to flourish. Academic research using colonial tax records has shown that Huguenot settlers produced significantly more wine and were more productive than their non-Huguenot counterparts. This competitive advantage was attributed to their specialised knowledge and skills in viticulture, which were passed down through generations.

Beyond wine, the Huguenots brought advanced farming techniques and various craft skills to the colony. Their expertise led to a marked improvement in the quality of Cape agricultural products and helped establish the foundations of the region's renowned wine industry. The expansion of viticulture, a labor-intensive form of agriculture, also contributed to an increased demand for slave labor at the Cape, particularly during harvest seasons.

== Legacy ==
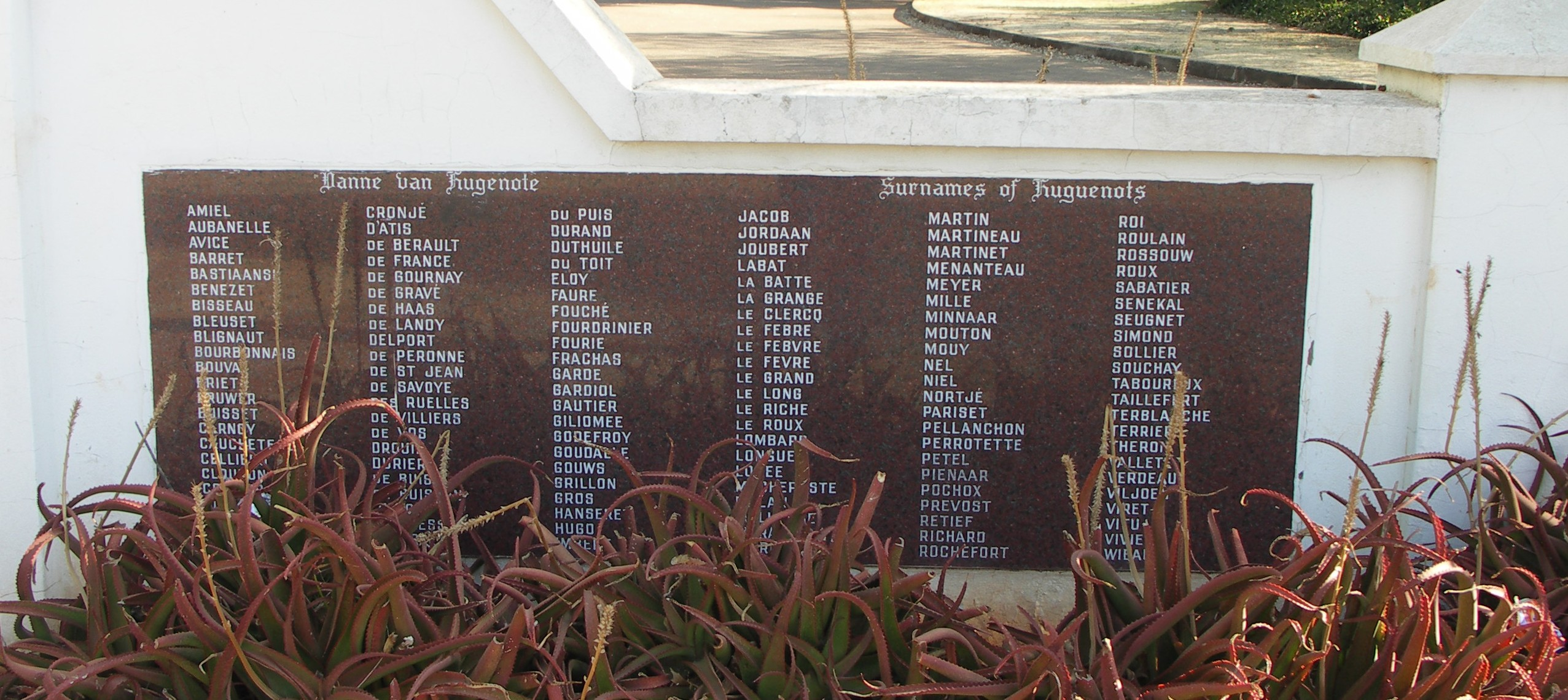
Surnames of Huguenot Families on the Huguenot Memorial in the Johannesburg Botanical Garden

=== Cultural and Linguistic Assimilation ===
The Dutch East India Company implemented a deliberate policy of assimilation. Beginning in 1701, this policy mandated that schools teach exclusively in Dutch, all official correspondence be conducted in Dutch, and strict laws of assembly be followed. The last French-speaking pastor, Paul Roux, ceased French-language services in 1710, and by 1707, French was banned in all official communications. Within two generations, French had ceased to be a home language for most Huguenot descendants, and by the mid-18th century, they no longer maintained a distinct identity separate from the broader Cape colonial population.

=== Surnames and descendants ===
Despite rapid cultural assimilation, Huguenot surnames have remained prominent in South Africa. A 1981 survey found that nine of the 36 most common surnames among white South Africans were of Huguenot origin, including Nel, Du Plessis, Coetzee, Fourie, and Viljoen. Today, approximately 40 Huguenot surnames survive, some retaining their original spelling (e.g., De Villiers, Malan, Du Toit) and others having been localised (e.g., Cronjé, Pienaar, Retief).

The Huguenot immigrants integrated quickly through intermarriage, facilitated by their shared Calvinist faith. By 1692, the 201 French Huguenots constituted approximately one-third of the free European population at the Cape. Genetic research indicates that Huguenot ancestry contributes an estimated 24% to the modern Afrikaner gene pool.

Descendants of these original families became prominent figures in South African society. In the first four volumes of the South African Biographical Dictionary, numerous entries are for individuals with Huguenot surnames like De Villiers, Du Toit, and Malan. One of the most notable descendants is F.W. de Klerk, the last State President of apartheid-era South Africa.

== Museum and monuments ==
A large monument to commemorate the arrival of the Huguenots in South Africa was inaugurated on 17 April 1948 at Franschhoek. A museum dedicated to the Huguenot history in South Africa is located adjacent to the monument.

A smaller monument commemorating the 300th anniversary of the arrival of the Huguenots is located in the Johannesburg Botanical Garden.

== Voortrekkers ==
French Huguenot descendants were also included in the exodus of frontier farmers that was called the Great Trek.

Voortrekker surnames who were of French Huguenot ancestry include: (Original French spelling in brackets)

- Aucamp (Auchamp)
- Boshof (Bossau)
- Bruwer (Bruere)
- Buys (Du Buis)
- Cilliers (Cellier)
- Cronje (Cronier)
- de Klerk (Le Clercq)
- Delport (Delporte)
- de Villiers
- du Buisson
- du Plessis
- du Preez (des Prez, des Pres, du Pre)
- du Randt (Durand)
- du Toit
- Duvenage (Duvinage)
- Fouche (Foucher)
- Fourie
- Gous, Gouws (Gauch)
- Hugo (Hugot, Hugod)
- Jacobs (Jacob)
- Jordaan (Jourdan)
- Joubert (Jaubert)
- Labuschagne (la Buscagne)
- le Roux
- Lombard
- Malan (Mallan)
- Marais
- Maartens, Martins (Martin)
- Malherbe
- Minnaar (Meinard, Mesnard)
- Meyer
- Naudé
- Nel (Neel, Niel)
- Nortier, Nortje (Nourtier)
- Pienaar (Pinard)
- Retief (Retif)
- Reyneke? (Reyne?)
- Riekert? (Richard?)
- Rossouw (Rousseau)
- Roux
- Senekal (Senecal, Senechal)
- Taljaard (Taillard)
- Terblanche (Terreblanque)
- Theron (Therond)
- Tredoux
- Viljoen (Villion)
List of prominent South Africans of Huguenot descent

Some of the original forms of the surnames have been put in brackets.

- Aegidius Jean Blignaut, South African writer
- George Christopher Cato (Caton) first mayor of Durban.
- Jan F. E. Celliers, Afrikaans-language poet, essayist, dramatist and reviewer.
- Sarel Cilliers, Voortrekker leader and a preacher.
- Hansie Cronje cricketer
- Piet Cronje leader of the Transvaal Republic's military forces during the First and Second Anglo-Boer Wars
- F.W. de Klerk (born 18 March 1936; "Le Clerc"), last State President of apartheid-era South Africa.
- Koos de la Rey, (Jacobus Herculaas de la Rey) (22 October 1847 – 15 September 1914) was a Boer general during the Second Boer War
- Fanie de Villiers, former South African cricket player
- AB de Villiers, former South African cricket player
- Rilee Rossouw Top class all rounder cricketer
- Hempies du Toit, Springboks rugby player and winemaker
- Jean de Villiers, Springboks rugby player
- Pieter de Villiers, South African hurdler
- Dricus du Plessis, Mixed Martial Arts, UFC Middleweight fighter
- Faf du Plessis, South African cricketer
- Morne du Plessis, Springboks rugby player
- I. D. du Plessis, poet
- Ampie du Preez, singer-songwriter
- Frik du Preez ("du Prez"), Springboks rugby player, named as South Africa's rugby player of the 20th century
- Max du Preez, journalist and author
- Mignon du Preez, South African cricketer
- Alexander du Toit, geologist
- Daniel du Toit, South African astronomer
- Christiaan du Toit, South African military commander
- D. F. du Toit, co-founder of an Afrikaans language movement named the Society of Real Afrikaners
- S. G. du Toit, co-founder of an Afrikaans language movement named the Society of Real Afrikaners
- Wikus du Toit
- Stephanus Jacobus du Toit, co-founder of an Afrikaans language movement named the Society of Real Afrikaners
- Abraham Faure, (29 August 1795 – 28 March 1875) Cape clergyman and author
- Jacobus Johannes Fouché, (6 June 1898, Wepener – 23 September 1980[1] Cape Town) served as the second President of South Africa from 1968 to 1975
- Johnny Fourie, famous jazz guitarist.
- Elsa Joubert, South African novelist in Afrikaans
- Gideon Joubert, South African author and journalist Afrikaans science non-fiction author
- Marius Joubert, Springboks rugby player
- Petrus Jacobus Joubert, boer commandant-general of the South African Republic from 1880 to 1900
- Piet Joubert
- Ruda Landman
- Frederick Le Roux, South African cricketer
- Garth Le Roux, South African cricketer
- Adolph Malan (1910–1963), known as Sailor Malan, Royal Air Force fighter pilot in the Second World War
- Daniel François Malan, who was a Prime Minister of South Africa elected on apartheid platform
- Magnus Malan, former South African Minister of Defence (in the cabinet of President P. W. Botha), Chief of the South African Defence Force (SADF) and Chief of the South African Army.
- Rian Malan, celebrated South African author, journalist and political activist.
- D. F. Malherbe, Afrikaans novelist
- Gideon Malherbe, co-founder of an Afrikaans language movement named the Society of Real Afrikaners
- Ben Marais
- Eugene Marais
- Sarie Marais
- Beyers Naudé, Afrikaner anti apartheid cleric.
- Charle-Pierre Naudé, poet
- Jozua Naudé, acting President of South Africa from 1967 to 1968
- Francois Pienaar, former Springboks rugby player; captain of the first Springboks team to win the Rugby World Cup in 1995
- Piet Retief, boer voortrekker
- Esta TerBlanche ("Terre-Blanche")
- Eugène Terre'Blanche ("Terre-Blanche"), South African political activist and leader of AWB
- Juan Theron, South African-born cricketer who has played both for the South African national cricket team and the United States national cricket team
- Charlize Theron, Hollywood actress
- Totius (Jakob Daniël du Toit) – poet
- Constand Viljoen ("Villion"), former leader of the South African Freedom Front (1994–2001) and SADF general
- Gerrit Viljoen
- H.D Viljoen (Former Inspector General SADF)
- Marais Viljoen
- Paul Visagie, athlete and direct descendant of General Piet Joubert

== See also ==
- Huguenot
- Huguenot Monument
- Huguenot Memorial Building
- History of Cape Colony
- Protestantism in South Africa
- White South Africans
