= Huguenot Memorial Museum =

Museum in Western Cape, South Africa

- Hugenote-Gedenkmuseum
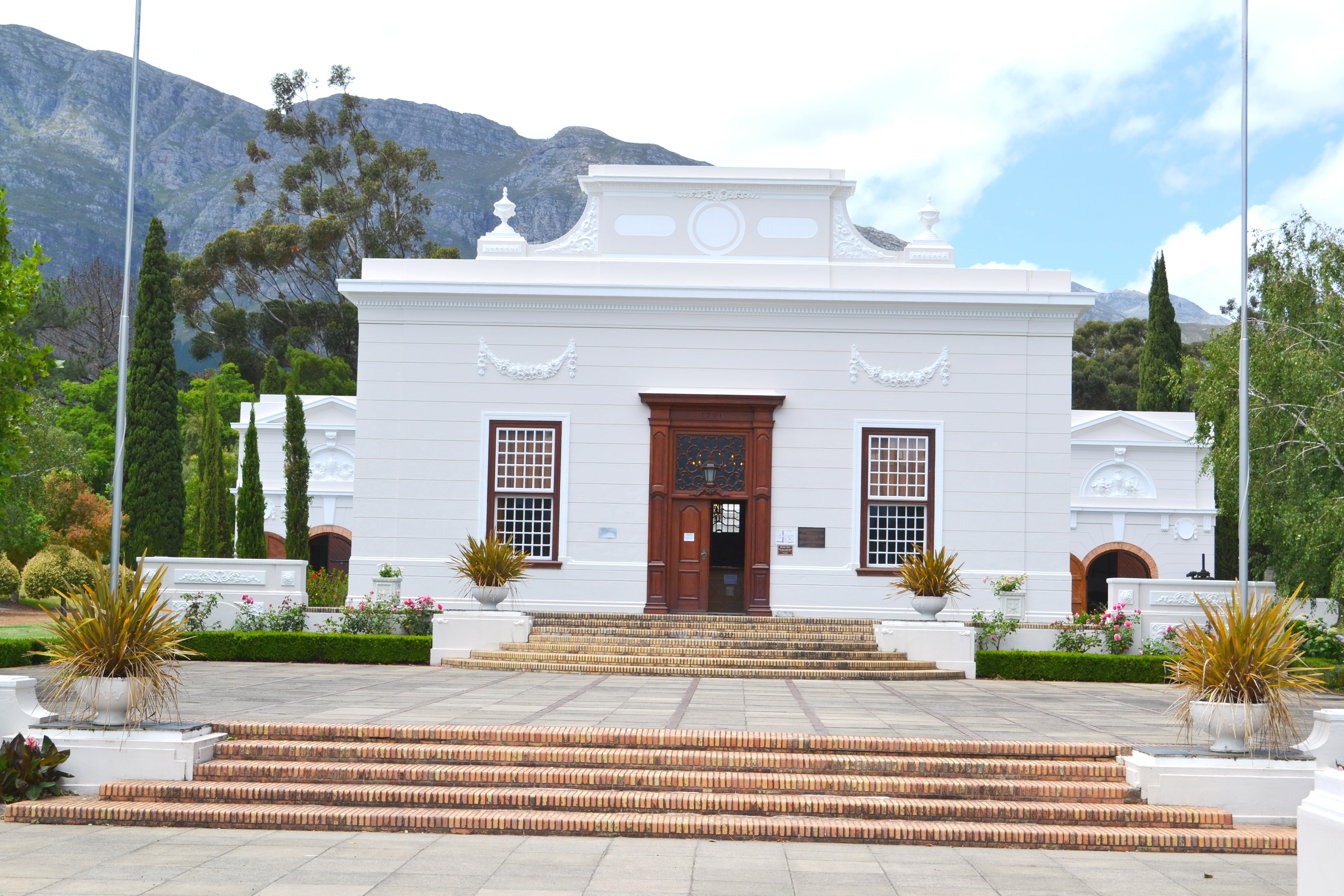
- Location: Franschhoek (Cape Winelands District Municipality), Western Cape, South Africa
- Coordinates: 33.914006°S 19.123878°E
- Website: www.museum.co.za

Huguenot Memorial Museum portrays the history of the French Huguenots who came to South Africa at the end of the seventeenth century. Displays are housed in the main building, and continue in the annex. The museum also has a shop, and is adjacent to the Huguenot Monument.

== History ==
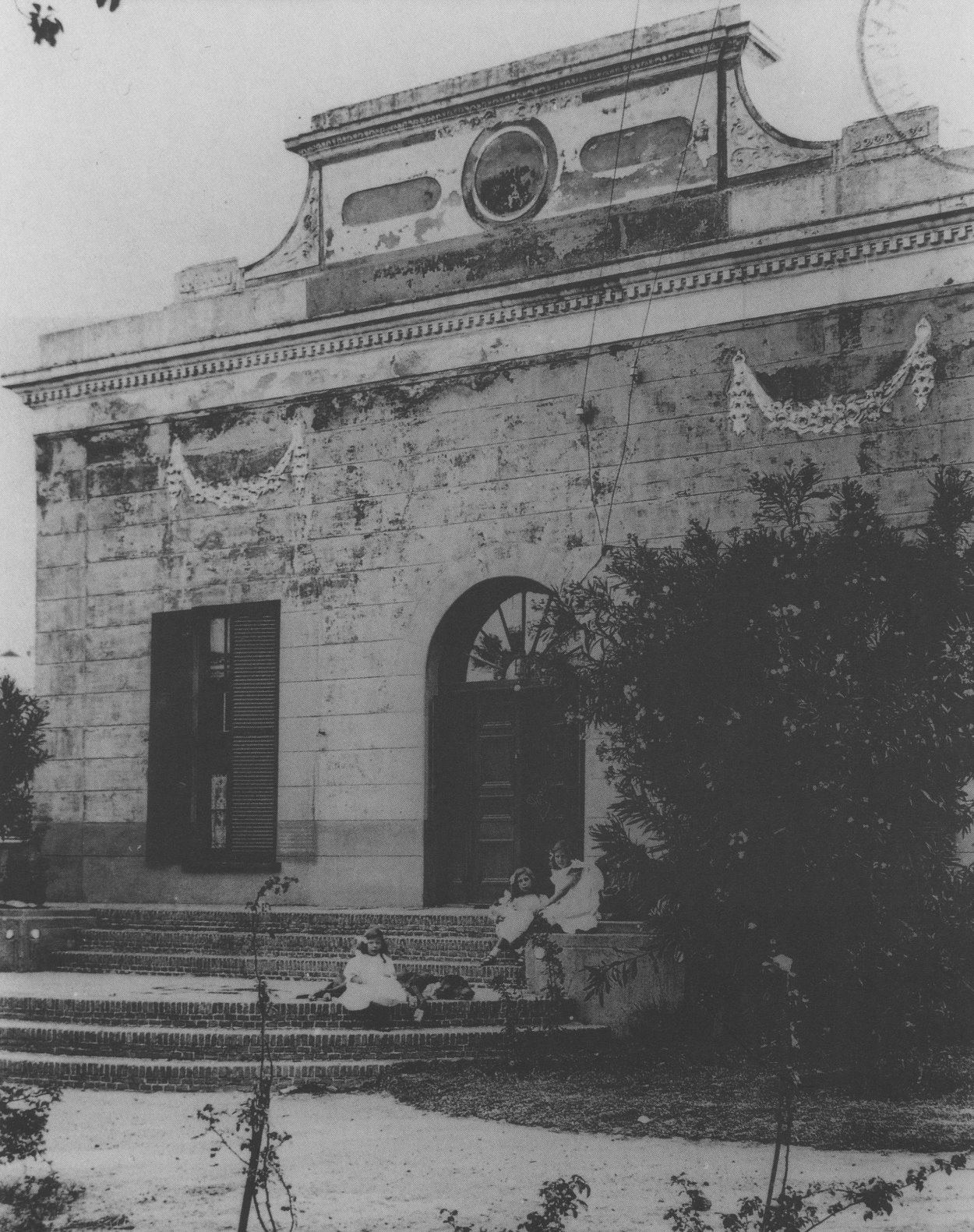
Saasveld House in Kloof Street photographed by Arthur Elliott

Built in 1967, the main building was originally a building called Saasveld House situated in Kloof Street, Cape Town. Saasveld House was the home of Dutch East India Company employee William Ferdinand van Reede van Oudtshoorn, the son of Baron Pieter van Reede van Oudtshoorn, built on land granted to his father in the 1740s. The architect of Saasveld House was Louis Michel Thibault. It was demolished and rebuilt brick by brick in Franschhoek. The main building features original items from this building, e.g. door frame, slates from Robben Island, the gates to the premises. All were brought to Franschhoek by the Huguenot Society.

== Displays ==
The museum displays cover two major topics. In the main building, the history of the French Huguenots is discussed in detail. Topics include: Why they came, who brought them, where they settled and a list of surnames of Huguenot origin. Displays in the annex convey the history of the town of Franschhoek, and have a broader scope. Topics in this building include: Fynbos, Khoisan history and the local fruit industry.

== Museum activities ==
The museum presents education programs e.g. history of the Huguenots, Fynbos, Khoisan, Architecture and Genealogy / Families. Guided tours of the museum for visitors are also available. The annual Huguenot Festival presented by the Huguenot Society in conjunction with the museum takes place in the last weekend of October. During the festival the museum also host an exhibition of roses.

=== Museum publications ===
The museum publishes booklets on various subjects. Recent titles include: The History of Franschhoek, The Edict of Nantes, Contact with Indigenous People and the genealogy series on Huguenot surnames.

== See also ==
- Huguenot
