= Japanese School of Johannesburg =

- ヨハネスブルグ日本人学校

Location
- 12–20 Caledon Road, Emmarentia Johannesburg, 2195 Rep. of SOUTH AFRICA; 26.1503°S 28.0003°E

Information
- Type: Japanese International School
- Established: 31st August, 1966 (Showa 41)
- Website: jsj.org.za

The Japanese School of Johannesburg (ヨハネスブルグ日本人学校, Yohanesuburugu Nihonjin Gakkō; JSJ) is a Japanese school in Emmarentia, Johannesburg, South Africa.

== History ==
The Nippon Club of South Africa (日本人会 Nihonjin-kai), a Johannesburg-based organisation, sponsors the school to encourage Japanese businesspeople to bring their families to Johannesburg. The club had been established in 1961 to assist Japanese companies operating in Johannesburg. It was responsible for the early development and promotion of the Japanese School of Johannesburg.

The Government of Japan financially subsidises the school, while the land used for the school was provided by the Government of South Africa. It opened in 1966. In its early days, up until around 1980, the school faced harassment and opposition from community residents. The school had to close its Saxonwold location because of a hostile campaign in 1968. It re-opened in February 1969 under restrictions including limiting the size of the student body to 30. In one suburb, the school was a frequent target of vandalism and racist graffiti.

The lawsuit Evans v Japanese School of Johannesburg was filed in 2006. The applicant said that she was told that when she turned 63 years of age, she was required to retire, and accused her job loss of being unfair.
