= Huguenot Memorial Building =

Building in Cape Town, South Africa

Coordinates: 33°55′35″S 18°24′59″E

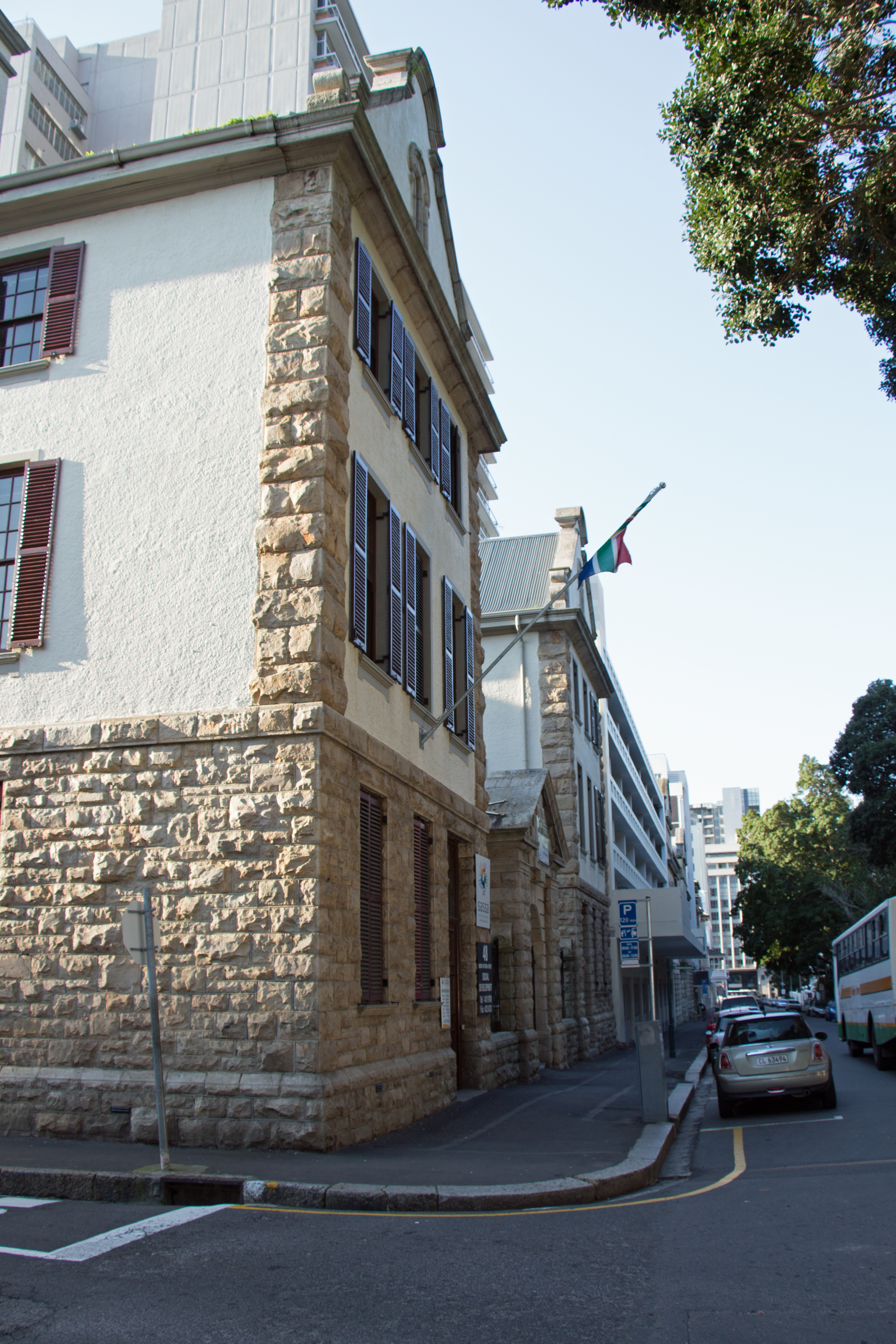
Huguenot Memorial Building, Cape Town

The Huguenot Memorial Building, located at 48 Queen Victoria Street, Cape Town, is a provincial heritage site in Cape Town in the Western Cape province of South Africa.

In 1980 it was described in the Government Gazette as

This predominantly Edwardian building was erected by the Synod of the Dutch Reformed Church to commemorate the arrival of the French Huguenots (1688). The foundation stone was laid on 24 August 1899 and the building was officially opened on 15 October 1903. The mortal remains of President S.J.P. Kruger lay in state here from 1 December to 6 December 1904.

The grounds for the memorial were not easily obtained. The Huguenot Memorial Society had to go to the Supreme Court in order to secure the rights to the disused cemetery where they intended to erect the building.

The building houses the Cape Town office of the South African Social Security Agency (SASSA).

== See also ==
- Huguenots in South Africa
- Huguenot Monument
