= Huddle Park (Johannesburg) =

Public park in Johannesburg, South Africa

Huddle Park is one of the largest parks in Johannesburg, South Africa. It is situated on a wetland and is adjacent to the suburbs of Linksfield and Orange Grove. It comprises approximately 200 hectares of grassland and woodland, with three tree-lined dams providing fishing and bird-watching opportunities.

== Facilities ==
Three golf courses take up most of the space in the park, and, although the blue course is a former SA Open course and is still playable, the white and the yellow courses have been left untended for years and have gone to seed.

Besides the golf course, the park also has an Acro-Branch facility, a Cross-Fit gym, an equestrian club, and various mountain biking trails and walking trials.

There is a Parkrun course located in Huddle Park, and takes place every Saturday.

== See also ==
- Johannesburg City Parks
