= Emmarentia =

- Location within Gauteng Location within South Africa
- Coordinates: 26.156°S 28.003°E
- Country: South Africa
- Province: Gauteng
- Municipality: City of Johannesburg
- Main Place: Johannesburg

Area
  - Total: 3.81 km^{2} (1.47 sq mi)

Population (2011)
  - Total: 5,116
  - Density: 1,340/km^{2} (3,480/sq mi)

Racial makeup (2011)
  - Black African: 26.1%
  - Coloured: 2.5%
  - Indian/Asian: 27.4%
  - White: 40.9%
  - Other: 3.0%

First languages (2011)
  - English: 67.2%
  - Afrikaans: 10.2%
  - Zulu: 5.5%
  - Tswana: 3.4%
  - Other: 13.7%
- Time zone: UTC+2 (SAST)
- Postal code (street): 2195
- PO box: 2029

Emmarentia (which usually encompasses Emmarentia Ridge and Emmarentia Ext. 1) is a suburb of Johannesburg, South Africa.

== History ==
Emmarentia lies on land that once made up the Braamfontein Farm, one of many large farms that make what is Johannesburg and its suburbs. The land was bought in 1886 by Lourens Geldenhuys for its mining rights as it was hoped that the Confidence Reef would extend into his farm but it did not. Land remained as a farm and by 1891 it was divided, along what is now Orange Road, between his son's Frans and Louw where the brothers had already built two farm houses. Frans' farmhouse still exists as the clubhouse at the Marks Park Sports Club and Louw's which exists close by at 14 Greenhill Road.

After the Second Boer War, in which Louw Geldenhuys and his brother had taken part of as members of the Krugersdorp Commando, he decided to help some landless and unemployed Boers war veterans. He used them to construct a stone and earth dam from blocks of stone from the Melville Koppies behind the farm and cost £12,000. The dam was built over the Westdene spruit which is a tributary of the larger Braamfontein Spruit. The dam was then named after his wife Emmarentia Margaretha Botha. A hundred of these workers were then settled in 14 irrigated smallholdings on 145 morgens of the farm in what are now the suburbs of Emmarentia, Linden and Greenside where they grew fruits and vegetables with rent based on a third of the profits of the sale of the produce.

Louw died in 1929 and his wife Emmarentia would begin to sell parts of the farm that became the suburbs Greenside in 1931, and Emmarentia on 28 April 1937, named after her and in 1941, Emmarentia Extension. In 1933, 13 hectares of the farm were donated to the City of Johannesburg for parks and recreation, and after further pieces of land were acquired, became the Jan van Riebeeck Park (1952) and the Johannesburg Botanical Garden (1964), Emmarentia Dam (1939), the Marks Park Sports Club (1951) and West Park Cemetery (1942).

In 1938, Emmarentia Geldenhuys died and was buried at the family cemetery in Hill Road. The small cemetery still exists with 77 graves in the small cemetery with other names such as Swanepoel, Steyn, Ayres, Hopley and McGrath possibly the smallholding farmers Louw Geldenhuys had helped out. The suburbs captures the names of the original owners of the farm as street names, Judith Road is named after Frans Geldenhuys' wife, Judith Grobbelaar. While Louw Geldenhuys Road runs past the dam he built.

During the apartheid era, it was classed as a "whites only" area under the terms of the Group Areas Act. Historically, it has been a centre for Johannesburg's Jewish community. A Jewish congregation was established in the 1950s in Emmarentia and Emmarentia Shul was consecrated in 1961. In 1971, Jews made up 53.8% of residents.

== Areas of interest ==
Within its boundaries, one can find:

- Emmarentia Dam;
- Johannesburg Botanical Garden;
- Part of the Melville Koppies;
- Marks Park Sports Club
  Formed on 19 December 1938 by Mr. I Marks, Town Clerk of Johannesburg at Paterson Park. In 1951 the club moved to its current location gathering together the different sports groups in one place. The clubhouse is the old farmhouse of Frans and Judith Geldenhuys;
- Masjid - ur - Rahmah – Emmarentia's first mosque.
  Located on the corner of Ingalele Road and Barry Hertzog Road.

Emmarentia shares its borders with the suburbs of Melville, Greenside, Greenside East, Victory Park, Linden, Montgomery Park, and Roosevelt Park.

=== Dabulamanzi Sailing Club ===
This sailing club is located on Emmarentia Dam and was started in 1979. The name is derived from a Zulu warrior called Dabulamanzi kaMpande, whose name translates to "the one who conquers water".

== Education ==
Emmarentia Primary School is located in the suburb of Emmarentia on the corner of Hill Road and Umgeni, and was established over 60 years ago.

Emmarentia is the location of the Japanese School of Johannesburg located in Caledon Road close to the dam.

Littlehill Montessorri School is also located in Emmarentia, on Hofmeyer Drive. The school is renowned for its unique curriculum, which includes Cultural Studies.

== Notable residents ==
- Helen Zille, politician
- Joe Pamensky, cricketer, lived at 27 Limpopo Road
