= Emmarentia Dam =

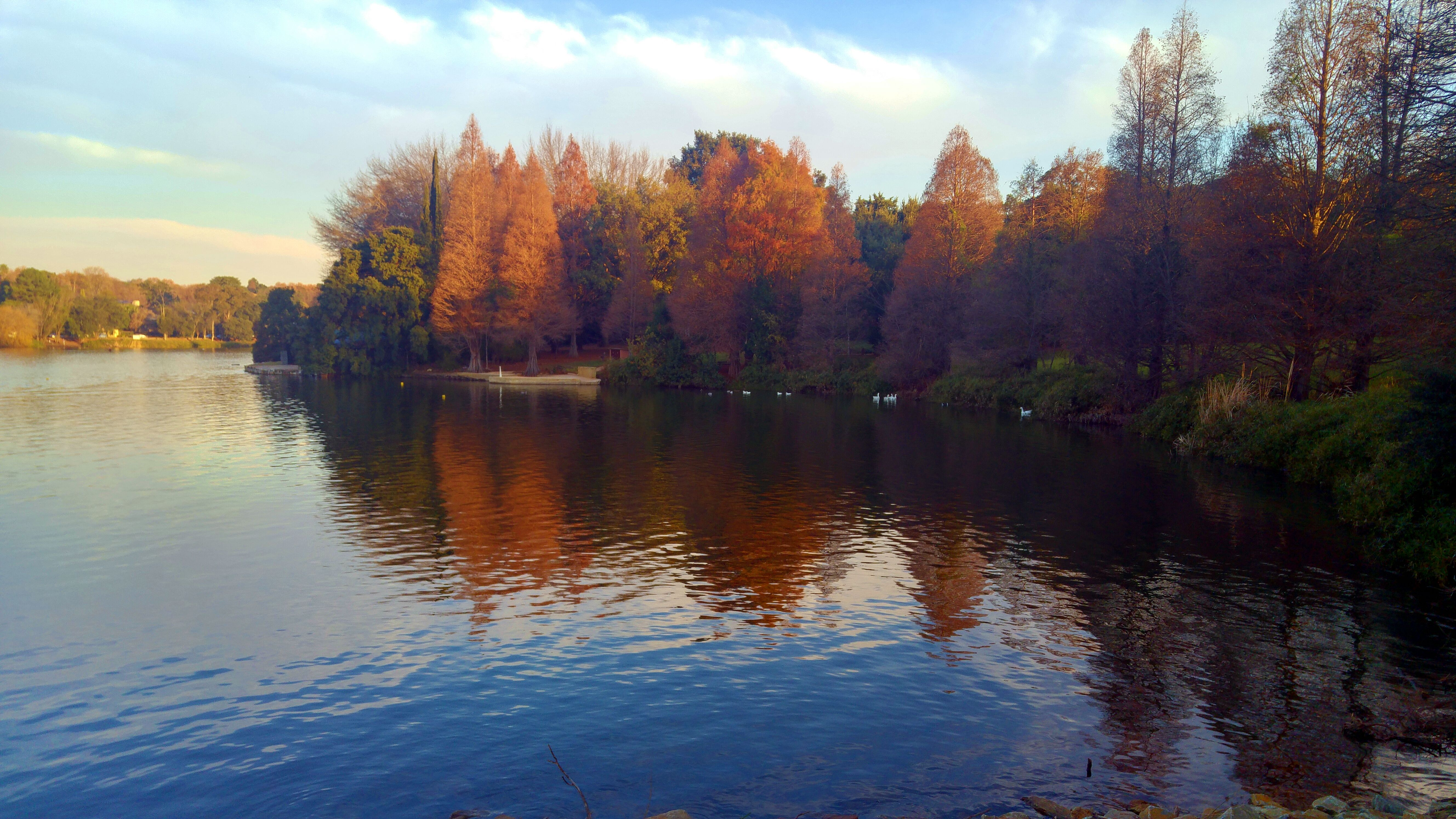
- Emmarentia Dam in autumn as viewed from the Olifants Road Bridge

- Location within South Africa
- Interactive map of Emmarentia Dam
- Official name: Emmarentia Dam
- Country: South Africa
- Location: Johannesburg, Gauteng
- Coordinates: 26°09′S 28°01′E
- Purpose: Recreational, wildlife
- Opening date: 1912
- Owner: City of Johannesburg

Dam and spillways
- Type of dam: Earth fill dam
- Impounds: Braamfontein Spruit

Reservoir
- Creates: Emmarentia Dam Reservoir
- Total capacity: 250 megalitres (200 acre⋅ft)
- Surface area: 8.8 hectares (22 acres)
- Bridge carries traffic on Olifants Road

Emmarentia Dam is a dam in Emmarentia, Johannesburg, South Africa. There are several dams that make up Emmarentia Dam, despite its allusion to the singular, with two small dams found upstream in the Johannesburg Botanical Gardens.

== History ==
The Emmarentia Dam lies on land that once made up the Braamfontein Farm, one of many large farms that make what is Johannesburg and its suburbs. The land was bought in 1886 by Lourens Geldenhuys for its mining rights as it was hoped that the Confidence Reef would extend into his farm but it did not. The land remained as a farm and by 1891 it was divided between his son's Frans and Louw where the brothers had already built two farm houses, still in existence, close to where the dam is today.

After the Second Boer War, in which Louw Geldenhuys and his brother had taken part of as members of the Krugersdorp Commando, he decided to help some landless and unemployed Boers war veterans. He used them to construct a stone and earth dam from blocks of stone from hills behind the farm and cost £12,000. The dam was built over the Westdene spruit which is a tributary of the larger Braamfontein Spruit. The dam was then named after his wife Emmarentia Botha. A hundred of these workers were then settled in 14 irrigated smallholdings on 145 morgens of the farm in what are now the suburbs of Emmarentia, Linden and Greenside where they grew fruits and vegetables with rent based on a third of the profits of the sale of the produce.

Louw died in 1929 and his wife Emmarentia began to sell parts of the farm that became the suburbs Greenside in 1931, Emmarentia in 1937 named after her, and in 1941, Emmarentia Extension. In 1933, 13 hectares of the farm were donated to the City of Johannesburg for parks and recreation, and after further pieces of land were acquired, became the Jan van Riebeeck Park (1952) and the Johannesburg Botanical Garden (1964), Emmarentia Dam (1939), the Marks Park Sports Club (1951) and West Park Cemetery (1942).

== Dam and its surrounds ==
The length of the dam is about 400 metres (1,310 ft) with a maximum depth of 6.7 metres (22 ft) and a water surface of 8.8 hectares (22 acres). The Johannesburg Botanical Garden is on the western shore of the dam. The western shore consists of woodlands, natural grass areas used for picnics, braais (barbecues) and dog walking, and a tea room. The whole area allows for extensive walking, with distant views of Sandton and Rosebank, and the (nearby) Melville Koppies. There is a well-tended rose garden, and Johannesburg City Parks maintains a tree-planting programme. An extensive variety of trees can be seen, and there is also a wide variety of bird life and small mammals such as mongoose and tree squirrels.. The main dam, to the east of the gardens, hosts the 1st Victory View Sea Scout Group boathouse, whilst on the eastern shore, south of the dam wall, the Emmarentia aquatic sport clubs reside, comprising the Emmarentia Sailing Club, the Normalair Underwater Club, and the Dabulamanzi Canoe Club, flanked by a narrow shoreline to the head of the dam, easily accessible to fisherman and picnickers. The dam spillway outfall discharges back into the Westdene Spruit, with beautiful park lawns, open wooded area, and a small lower dam, flanked by the 1st Greenside Scout Group on John McKenzie Drive.

=== Dam restoration project ===
In April 2015, the Johannesburg Roads Agency initiated a project to rehabilitate the dam wall and its infrastructure. The project was completed in May 2016 at a cost of R25 million. The last time the dam had been improved upon was in 1988. After an investigation, there was now a need to conduct preventative maintenance and upgrade of the flood retention protection to safeguard the dam and the residential properties below. The residents in the surrounding area suggested a clean up while the dam was drained.

== See also ==
- List of reservoirs and dams in South Africa
- List of rivers of South Africa
