= Albertskroon =

- Location within Gauteng Location within South Africa
- Coordinates: 26°09′40″S 27°58′26″E
- Country: South Africa
- Province: Gauteng
- Municipality: City of Johannesburg
- Main Place: Johannesburg
- Established: 1896

Area
  - Total: 0.99 km^{2} (0.38 sq mi)

Population (2011)
  - Total: 943
  - Density: 950/km^{2} (2,500/sq mi)

Racial makeup (2011)
  - Black African: 32.3%
  - Coloured: 3.3%
  - Indian/Asian: 7.0%
  - White: 40.6%
  - Other: 16.8%

First languages (2011)
  - Afrikaans: 33.9%
  - English: 29.7%
  - Zulu: 6.8%
  - Tswana: 4.7%
  - Other: 24.9%
- Time zone: UTC+2 (SAST)
- Postal code (street): 2195

Albertskroon is a suburb of Johannesburg, South Africa. It is located in Region B of the City of Johannesburg Metropolitan Municipality.

== History ==
The suburb is named after the previous landowner and descendants of Hendrick Abraham Alberts. The word Kroon in its name refers to a crown of a hill. The land is situated on the portion of an old Witwatersrand farm called Waterval around 1896.
