= Johannesburg Botanical Garden =

Botanical garden in Emmarentia, Johannesburg, South Africa

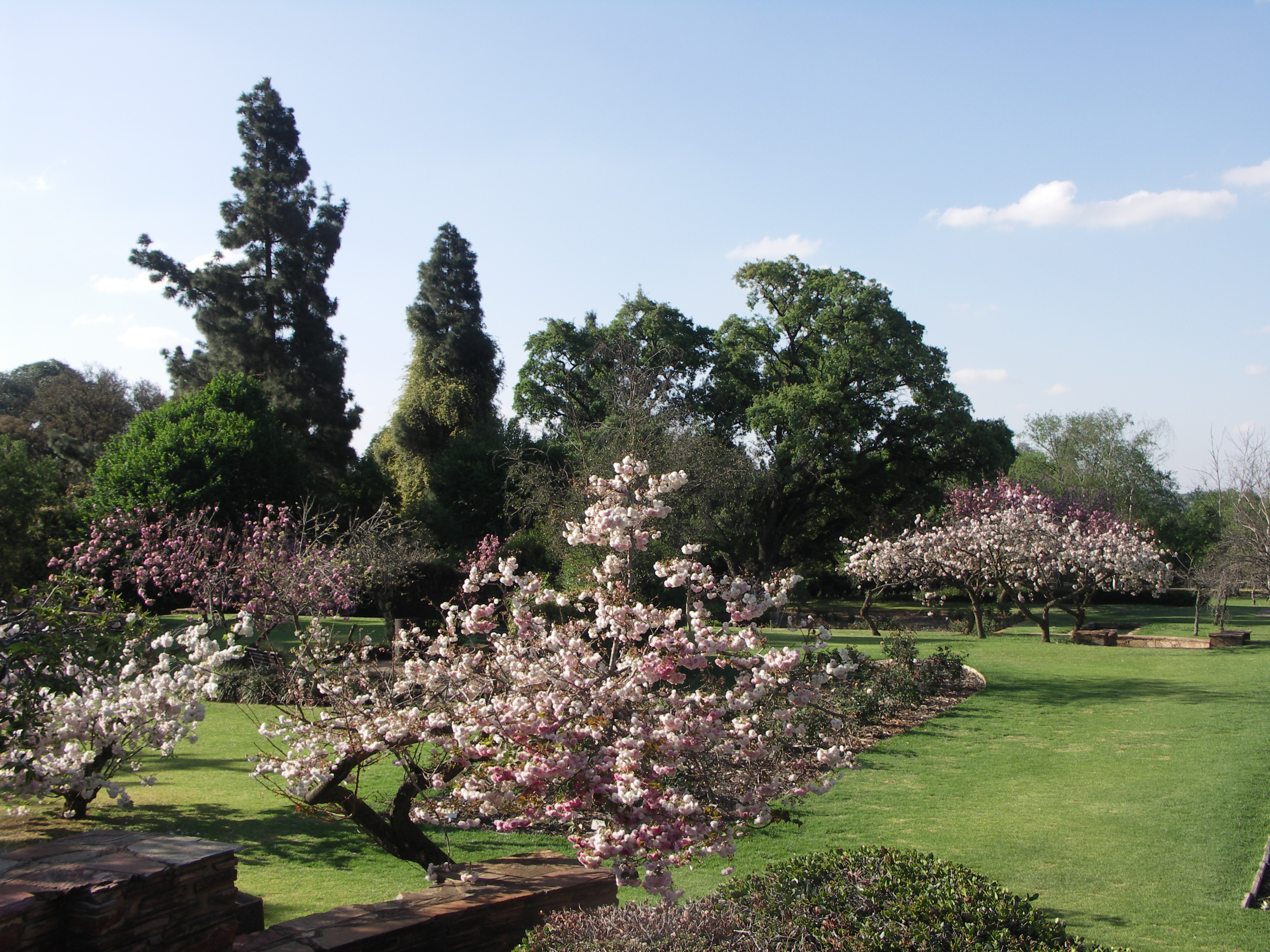
- The Rose Garden in the Johannesburg Botanical Garden
- Interactive map of Johannesburg Botanical Garden
- Type: Botanical garden
- Location: Johannesburg, South Africa
- Coordinates: 26°9′9″S 28°0′10″E
- Area: 81 hectares (200 acres)
- Elevation: 1605m
- Created: 1968
- Operator: Johannesburg City Parks
- Open: 6am - 6pm
- Camp sites: no
- Hiking trails: no
- Plants: 20,000 trees 2,500 succulents
- Collections: 5,532
- Parking: yes
- Website: JHB City Parks; Map of the Park

The Johannesburg Botanical Garden is located in the suburb of Emmarentia in Johannesburg, South Africa. The gardens grew out of a large rose garden that was established in 1964 (becoming known locally as the "Rose Garden") and subsequently expanded from 1969 to cover an area of around 125 hectares (1.25 km^{2}). It is administered by Johannesburg City Parks. The Emmarentia Dam is situated immediately to the east of the garden and shares its extensive acreage. One of the main attractions is the Rose Garden with over 10 000 roses.

== History ==
The Johannesburg Botanical Garden lies on land that once made up the Braamfontein farm, one of many large farms that make what is now Johannesburg and its suburbs. The farm has its origin back as far as 1853. The land was bought in 1886 by Lourens Geldenhuys for its mining rights as it was hoped that the Confidence Reef would extend into his farm but it did not. Land remained as a farm and by 1891 it was divided between his son's Frans and Louw where the brothers had already built two farm houses.

After the Second Boer War, in which Louw Geldenhuys and his brother had taken part of as members of the Krugersdorp Commando, he decided to help some landless and unemployed Boers war veterans. He used them to construct a stone and earth dam from blocks of stone from the Melville Koppies behind the farm and cost £12,000. The dam was built over the Westdene spruit which is a tributary of the larger Braamfontein Spruit. The dam was then named after his wife Emmarentia Margaretha Botha.

Louw died in 1929 and his wife Emmarentia would begin to sell parts of the farm that became the suburbs Greenside in 1931, and Emmarentia on 28 April 1937, named after her and in 1941, Emmarentia Extension. In 1933, 13 hectares of the farm were donated to the City of Johannesburg for parks and recreation, and after further pieces of land were acquired, became the Jan van Riebeeck Park (1952), Emmarentia Dam (1939), West Park Cemetery (1942) the Marks Park Sports Club (1951) and the Johannesburg Botanical Garden (1968).

The Johannesburg Council had been approached with the suggestions for a botanical garden since the 1920s. Eventually on 19 November 1968, the director of parks and recreation for the city presented a report to council with suggestion for a botanical garden. The council would agree and the botanical park would be developed on land in the Jan van Riebeeck Park with 81ha set aside.

== Collections ==
The garden is organized by theme and purpose of use and consists of

=== Restaurant ===
Cafe that serves light meals.

=== Chapel garden ===
This garden is used an outdoor chapel for weddings of all denominations.

=== Shakespeare garden ===
With a circular amphitheatre, this Shakespeare Garden contains the different types of herbs mention in Shakespearean work with quotes attached to the labels. Shakespearean events can be held there.

=== Rose garden ===
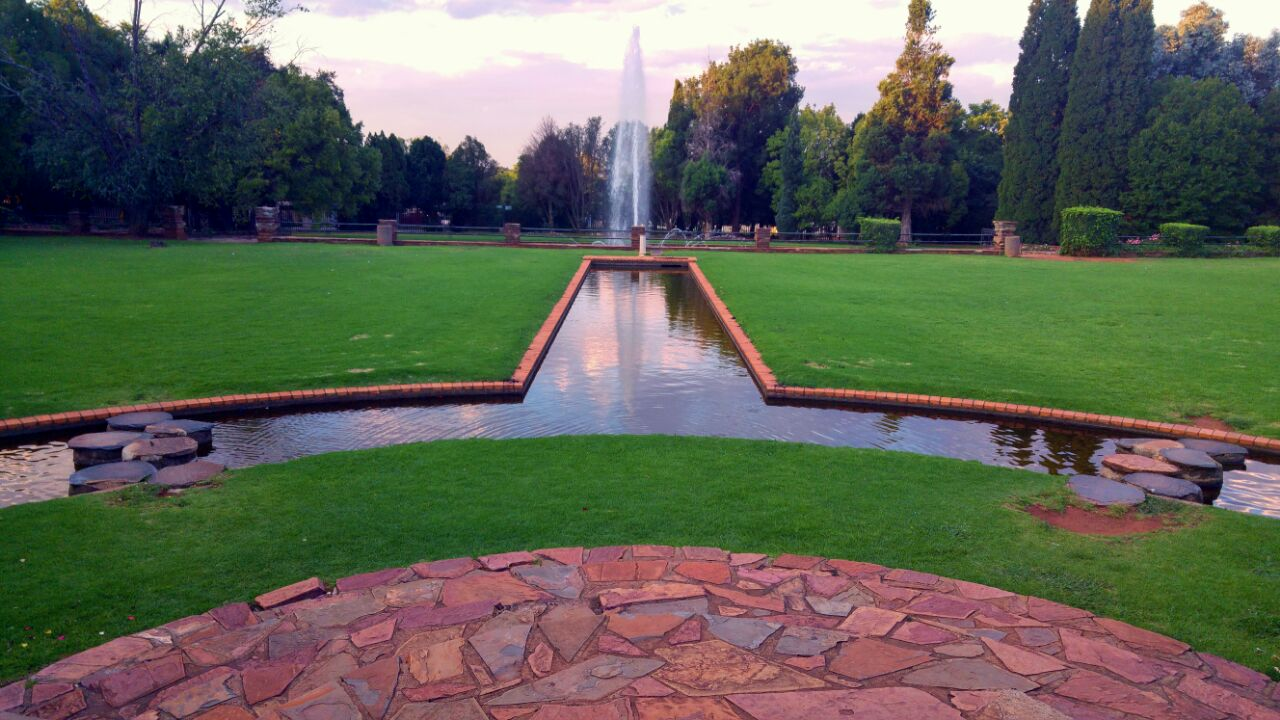
Water feature fountain at the lower end of the rose garden in the Johannesburg Botanical Gardens

Prior to the creation of the Botanical Gardens, the park had a rose garden that was laid out in 1964 by curator Patric Chambers. The garden consists of seven sloping terraces of about 10,000 roses. New roses are planted in a bed each year. The garden has water features and fountains.

=== Hedge garden ===
This garden has 58 different types of hedges.

=== Succulent garden ===
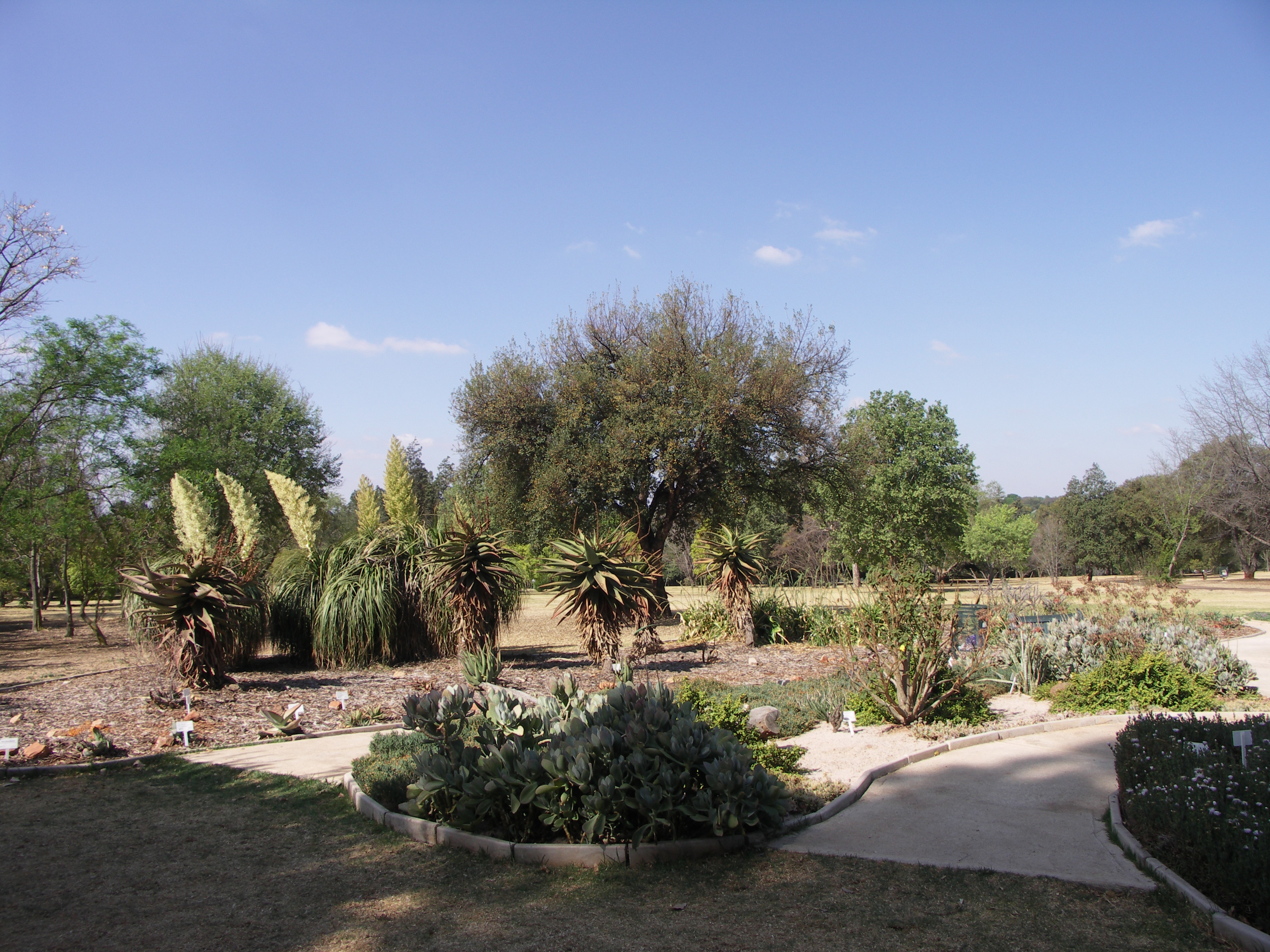
Portion of the Succulent Garden

This garden was opened in 2006 and designed with a desert outlook with more than 85 different species of succulents. There are also six glasshouses with South African and international succulents but are only open by appointment.

=== Arboretum ===
This area has both indigenous and exotic trees from around the world and includes Californian Redwoods, silver birches and English oaks though the park and arboretum itself has over 20 000 indigenous trees.

=== Herb garden ===
This garden contains herbs used in food preparation, cosmetics and oils as well as a section for plants used as muti, for African traditional medicine.

=== Johannesburg Botanical Garden Herbarium and Library ===
==== Herbarium ====
The herbarium houses 5,532 indigenous and exotic pressed plant specimens. Close by are the seed rooms that house seeds collected from parks in the City Johannesburg and are shared around the world.

==== Library ====
The library has 1,421 books, and 1,414 journals and pamphlets covering subjects such as taxonomy, biodiversity, morphology, plant anatomy, plant geography, ethnobotany and landscaping.

=== Other areas ===
- A Cycad Garden
- A Floreum
- A Bird island
- Wetlands
- Picnic area
- Dog walking section
- Nursery
- Environmental Education Center

== Monuments and memorials ==
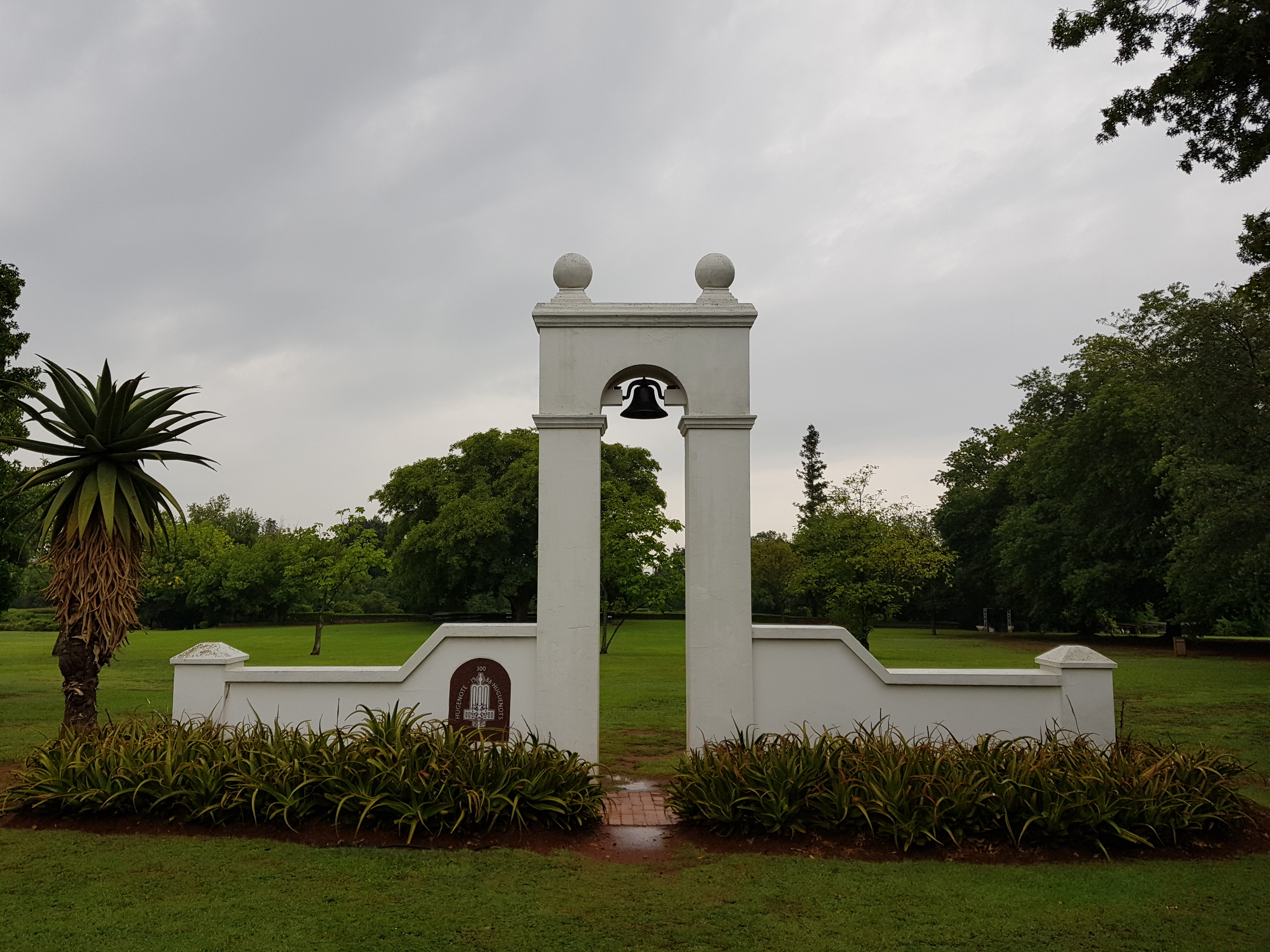
The 1988 Huguenot Memorial

A monument commemorating the 300th anniversary of the Huguenots in South Africa is located at the top of the rose garden.

== See also ==
- List of botanical gardens in South Africa
- Johannesburg City Parks
- Protected areas of South Africa
- Emmarentia Dam
