= Suburbs of Johannesburg =

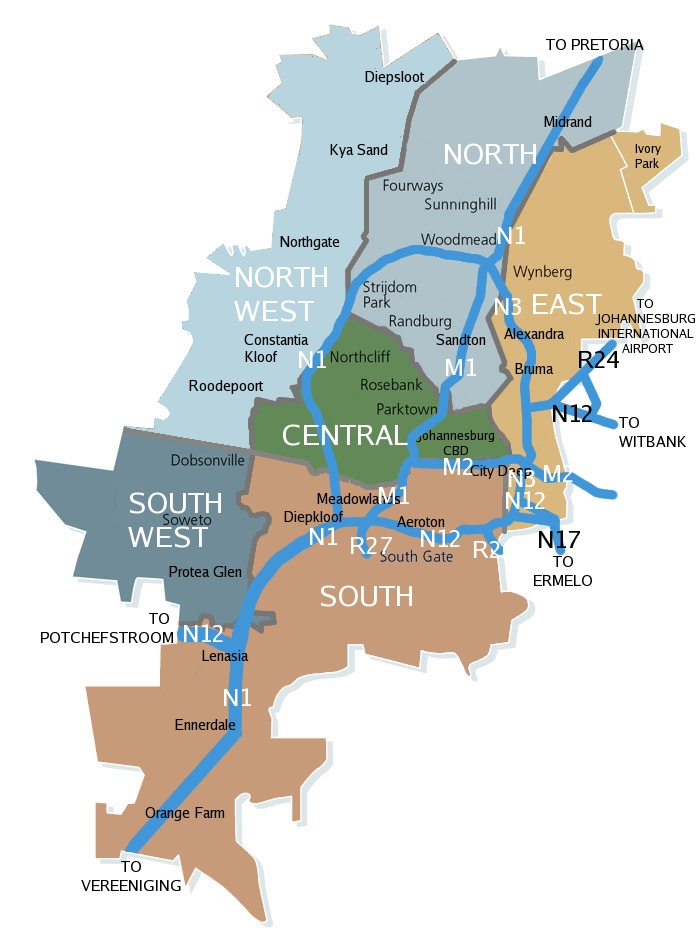
A map of Johannesburg indicating regions and freeways.

The suburbs of Johannesburg are officially demarcated areas within the City of Johannesburg Metropolitan Municipality, South Africa. As in other Commonwealth countries, the term suburb refers to a "neighbourhood", although in South Africa most (but not all) "suburbs" have legally recognised borders (see legal definition of township) and often (but not always) separate postal codes. The municipal functions for the area, such as municipal policing and social services, are still managed by the city government.

Johannesburg, like many other boom towns, grew rapidly and with little planning, and thus the city covers an extremely large area. The main differences between the city's suburbs tend to be socioeconomic: The north is often associated with wealth due to areas such as Houghton, which boasts large properties and contained the residence of former president Nelson Mandela, and Sandton which has become an alternative business district and is referred to as "Africa's richest square mile".

== History ==
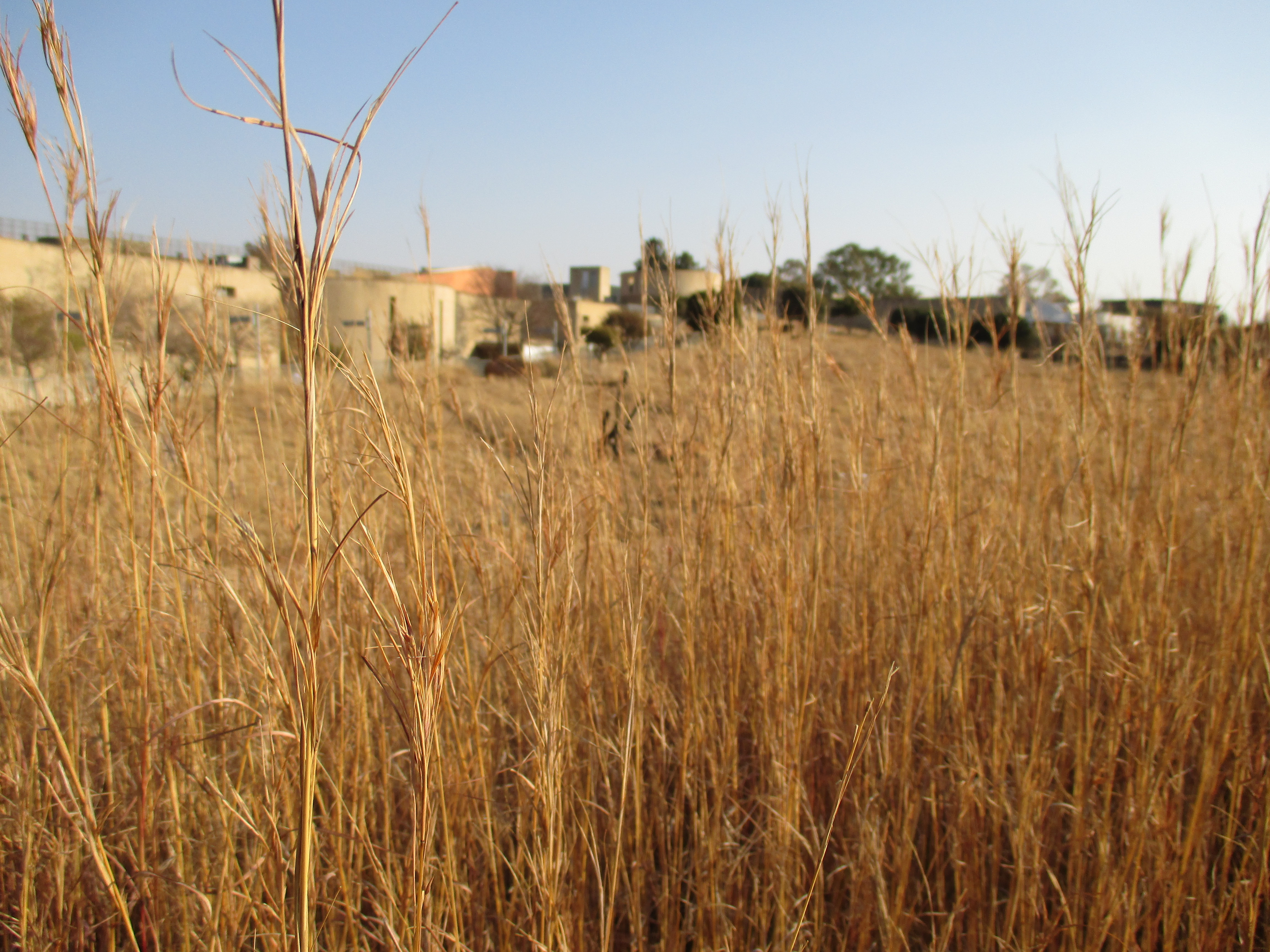
A park near Ormonde, Johannesburg South.

The first major modern settlements in Johannesburg were loosely planned, as they grew quickly in order to service the need for labour in the gold mines on the Witwatersrand. However, the population of Johannesburg increased rapidly and the city quickly established formal neighbourhoods, most of which were racially mixed as labourers lived together. The earliest formal settlement to house people of all races, Kliptown, is located near today's Soweto.

The Central Business District (CBD) grew rapidly in the early 20th century as many formal European style buildings were constructed, such as the city's main post office. The Central Business District was the first part of the city to be built in a grid, which was designed around the major road known as Commissioner Street, which served as the central artery for the city. During this time period, the city invested in street cars, which mostly served to connect wealthier white suburbs with the CBD. Physical growth, although somewhat limited by transportation, continued quickly as immigration to South Africa, and Johannesburg in particular, increased dramatically.

This problem was solved in the 1930s when the automobile was introduced in mass production to South Africa. Automobiles were, for the most part, confined to the wealthy, and permitted them to move to the north of the city and commute into the centre. The South African economy did extremely well at the end of World War II and many new immigrants came to South Africa from Europe. Most poor suburbs were mixed, with poor blacks and whites living together, although the wealthy suburbs were usually reserved for whites. This changed with the election of the National Party in the 1948 elections, who began to formalise the system known as apartheid. Apartheid formally designated which suburbs each race could live in under the Group Areas Act.

Consequently, the city was divided into white and black suburbs. The white suburbs were mostly wealthy and well-developed, and located in the nicest areas in the Johannesburg region. Black South Africans lived in poorly developed townships and suburbs out of view of the white suburbs. Many large freeways were built to link Johannesburg with the rest of South Africa, although this permitted the further outward expansion of the city along the N1, N3, and M2 roadways. Public transport construction was completely abandoned, except for a minor bus system.

This system continued until the 1980s, when international sanctions and a poor security situation led to a large contraction in the economy. Many companies abandoned skyscrapers that had been built in the Central Business District (CBD) in the 1960s and 1970s, and left warehouses vacant or rarely used.

When the Group Areas Act was repealed, there was a mass migration of former township dwellers and illegal immigrants to buildings in the CBD and surrounding areas, which caused crime rates to increase dramatically in the Central area of the city. Many businesses that had not closed their CBD offices left for more secured Northern suburbs, and in particular, Sandton. The amount of business and population of the northern suburbs increased exponentially, while the CBD was left empty and abandoned as a "no-go zone". The previous owners of buildings in the CBD abandoned them as their value decreased, and more illegal immigrants moved in. Many suburbs near the CBD also felt the demographic change as previously white and middle class suburbs like Yeoville became mostly black and dangerous within the space of two to three years.

The city government has attempted to rectify this situation as of 2005 by installing CCTV cameras all over the city centre and increasing police presence. Some businesses and residents have returned, although most businesses have built permanent and better facilities in the northern suburbs, so a large-scale return is unlikely. The city has grown so quickly to the north that the border between Johannesburg, Midrand, and Centurion is mostly an arbitrary political border. The two cities have since grown together as there is no space between them.

== Regions ==
The city of Johannesburg is divided into seven regions for administrative purposes, lettered from A to G. The previous system of eleven numbered regions was reorganised in 2006.

== Inner city ==
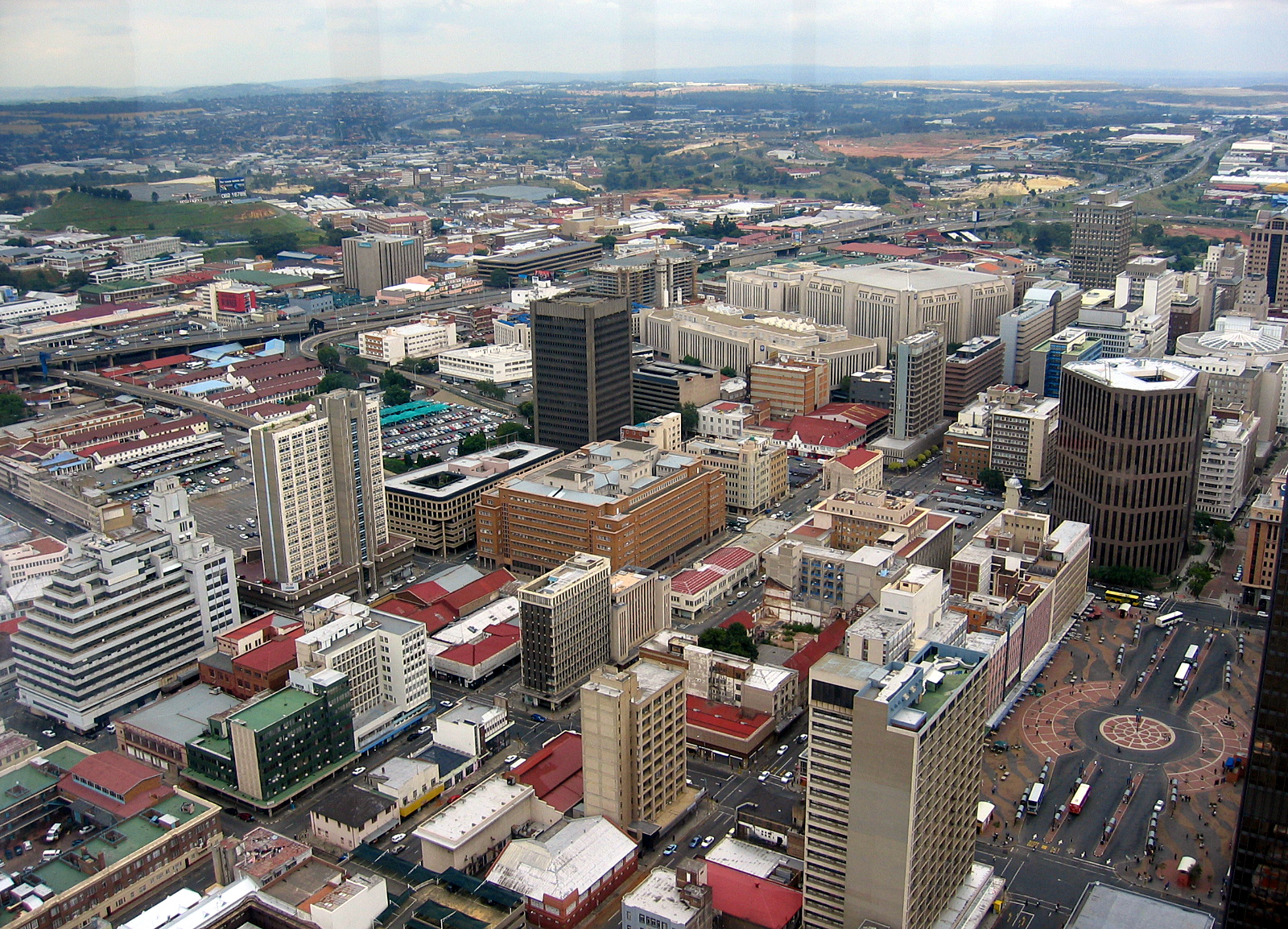
Marshalltown, as seen from the top of the Carlton Centre. The M1 and M2 run behind the buildings, and the southern suburbs extend past the highway boundary.

The inner city of Johannesburg is located within the city's Region F. The inner city is an extremely diverse region, with areas ranging from severely degraded residential areas such as Bertrams, to the somewhat stable commercial area of Braamfontein. The estimated population of the region is 200,000, but the number of people living in the inner city on an informal basis is unknown, as many are illegal immigrants. Most higher-income residents and white people have moved to the northern suburbs and have been replaced by lower-income black people. The unemployment, education, and age profiles of the area are all unknown, due to the difficulty of obtaining reliable information about the area. There have been significant movements to revitalise the CBD, most of which have focused on the reduction of crime, especially street crime in the central area, and the redevelopment of Newtown as a cultural hub for the city.

Centred on the CBD, the region includes the suburbs of Yeoville, Bellevue, Troyeville, Jeppestown, and Berea to the east. To the west it spreads to Pageview and Fordsburg. There are small industrial areas to the south, such as City West-Denver and Benrose.

Around 800,000 commuters pass through the inner city daily, and it functions as a regional shopping node for visitors from the southern suburbs. All major arterial roads originate from the inner city and spread out into other parts of the city. Johannesburg's main railway station, bus terminal, and minibus taxi centre are all located in the inner city.

The suburbs close to the CBD, in particular Joubert Park, Hillbrow, and Berea, have a large number of high-rise apartment blocks. These areas were formerly extremely desirable; however, due to the increase in crime, the housing stock has greatly deteriorated as many wealthier residents have left for the northern suburbs. The existing buildings in the CBD area are insufficient to meet the current demands for housing in the area, and as a result, many under-utilised or abandoned office buildings have been taken over by squatters, or converted into residential housing units. Yeoville and Bellevue have a mix of apartment buildings and single residential units on small lots.

The region is located on a mountainous divide that runs from east to west. The most conspicuous geographic feature is Observatory Ridge, which is named for the large observatory located on it. The recreational spaces are no longer used, due to security problems. The CBD area lacks open spaces; although there are small neighbourhood parks in all suburbs, they are also not used due to mugging concerns. Both the University of the Witwatersrand and the University of Johannesburg are located in the inner city. One of South Africa's leading sporting venues, Ellis Park Stadium, is located in Doornfontein. It serves as primary home of Jo'burg's two professional rugby union teams, the Lions in the Southern Hemisphere Super Rugby competition and the Golden Lions in the domestic Currie Cup. It was also a venue for the 2010 FIFA World Cup. Johannesburg Stadium, a training ground for both the Golden Lions and Orlando Pirates, is adjacent.

== Eastern suburbs ==
The eastern suburbs of Johannesburg are located in the city's 7th and 9th regions. The area is also functionally integrated with East Rand border towns outside of the official boundary of Johannesburg, such as Bedfordview and Edenvale (both part of Ekurhuleni Metropolitan Municipality). The major freeways in the area are the N3 eastern bypass freeway (which connects Sandton with Germiston) and the R24 freeway (which connects Johannesburg to O. R. Tambo International Airport).

The eastern suburbs are some of the oldest areas of Johannesburg, there are large communities of Jewish and other European backgrounds, the majority of the population is English speaking. There are three golf courses as well as a number of protected ridges with viewsites.

There are several well-developed and up-market entertainment and shopping areas in the east such as the Eastgate Shopping Centre and the Greenstone shopping centre.

== South-western suburbs and Soweto ==
Soweto and the south-western suburbs, located in Region 6 and Region 10, border the city's mining belt in the north. The area is mostly composed of old "matchbox" houses, or four-room houses built by the government, that were built to provide cheap accommodation for black workers during apartheid.

Soweto is an abbreviation, standing for "South Western Townships". Street after street in this area is lined with matchboxes; however, there are a few smaller areas where prosperous Sowetans have built houses that are more similar in stature with those in more affluent suburbs. Many people who still live in matchbox houses have improved and expanded their homes, and the City Council has enabled the planting of more trees and the improving of parks and green spaces in the area.

Hostels are another prominent physical feature of Soweto. Originally built to house male migrant workers, many have been improved as dwellings for couples and families. The N1 Western Bypass skirts the eastern boundary of Soweto. The suburb was not historically allowed to create employment centres within the area, so almost all of its residents are commuters to other parts of the city. There is efficient road access for many parts of the region along busy highways to the CBD and Roodepoort, but commuters are largely reliant on trains and taxis.

== Northern suburbs ==
Sandton City, the first building to be built in Sandton to replace the commercial function of the CBD.

The northern suburbs, located in Regions 2, 3, 4, and 7, include the most wealthy and developed parts of the city. Spreading to the north from the inner city to the border with Midrand, the northern suburbs include both large housing developments and commercial centres. The northern suburbs benefited greatly from the deterioration of the CBD, as many people and businesses moved. The northern suburbs have developed along the M1 and N1 highways, which serve as their major arterial roads. The N1 Western Bypass connects the northern suburbs with the north-western suburbs.

The residential areas in the northern suburbs are mainly formal, with no significant areas of informal housing, or housing that lacks a permanent structure. Although this is an established area, there is a trend of land use change from residential to commercial, especially along main arterial roads and around established nodes. The area is also becoming more dense, as large residential properties are subdivided, or redeveloped, as townhouse and cluster house complexes. The area is well connected to road networks, especially along the north-south axis formed by the M1 and N1. Roads to the east and west are less well developed, as there are no freeways travelling in that direction.

Towards the northern border of the city, the density of development decreases, leaving large areas of undeveloped land around Midrand. Grand Central Airport is also located in the area. The first suburb to the north of the inner city is Parktown, which is located on a hill overlooking the inner city and Hillbrow. It has many wealthy residents and Edwardian-style mansions, as well as the Education and Medical campuses of the University of the Witwatersrand. The large concrete Charlotte Maxeke Johannesburg Academic Hospital dominates the skyline of Parktown. There are numerous office parks in the suburb as well. Just to the west of Parktown is Westcliff and Parkwood, which is one of the wealthiest areas in Johannesburg, as it is located on the side of a very tall hill and overlooks the inner city as well as the northern suburbs. Other wealthy residential suburbs, Saxonwold, Houghton and Oaklands continue to the north of Westcliff. Nelson Mandela had a house in Houghton, and it is also the location of the most prestigious secondary schools in Johannesburg. Houghton is also the former electoral district of Helen Suzman, a famous anti-apartheid Member of Parliament.

The suburbs become more commercial to the north of Houghton. Rosebank is the centre of high-end retail and shopping for northern suburb residents. Many smaller companies who cannot afford to be located in Sandton also are located in Rosebank. The suburbs near Rosebank, including Parkhurst, Parktown North, Craighall Park and Greenside are collectively known as "The Parks". Parkhurst is known for its village atmosphere and pavement cafés and restaurants. Greenside is next to Parkhurst and has developed Parkhurst-style restaurants.

Hyde Park, Sandton, and Morningside are all to the north of Rosebank, all of which are extremely wealthy and well policed. Sandton has become the new business area of Johannesburg, and features many corporate headquarters, as well as Nelson Mandela Square and Wanderers Stadium, the most prestigious cricket ground in South Africa. The skyline of Sandton has grown rapidly and there are many projects under development in the area. Sandton is also the location of the JSE Securities Exchange, Africa's largest stock exchange, which relocated from the CBD in 2000.

The quality of life deteriorates on the outer fringes of the northern suburbs. One of the poorest townships, Alexandra, is located in this border area, to the east of Sandton.

== North-western suburbs ==
The north-western suburbs, located in Regions A and B, exist between the northern suburbs, Soweto, and the inner city. They are mostly low-rise although there are few skyscrapers. There are a few new developments in the recently incorporated city of Randburg, which is a chief commercial node for the area. The area is also connected to the rest of the city by the N1 Western Bypass.

Roodepoort is another major formerly independent municipality, recently incorporated into Johannesburg. Roodepoort's previously predominantly white population is changing as its proximity to Soweto has made it attractive to middle-class black people who want to move to nicer houses while maintaining ties to their old communities. There is ample access from the more affluent northern residential areas to the inner city. However, links are poor towards high economic and commercial areas in the north, such as Randburg and Sandton. This gives rise to increasing numbers of secondary roads, creating congestion and putting pressure on residential areas and infrastructure.

Towards the extreme north-west of the city, there are well-developed farms, as well as smaller formal and informal residential areas. There are also large manufacturing and industrial nodes. The informal settlements in this area are growing rapidly, with 76 per cent of the population of Diepsloot living in informal housing. The industrial areas along Malibongwe Drive in the south-west form part of the Kya Sand area. Fourways, in the south-east, is the major retail, office and entertainment area.

The first suburb to be grouped in the north-west is Auckland Park. Auckland Park is home to the headquarters of the South African Broadcasting Corporation, which is located in Radiopark, and two campuses of the sprawling University of Johannesburg.

North of Auckland Park lies Melville, which has morphed into a Bohemian enclave of restaurants, cafés, and bookstores based chiefly around 7th Avenue. This occurred mainly following the South African Broadcasting Corporation moving its headquarters to Auckland Park. Melville's main entertainment strip is 7th Road. A national serial drama, 7de Laan, shows the strip in its opening credits, mistakenly referring to the road as 7th Avenue. In Melville, lanes run east to west while roads lie north to south. Melville borders on the north to the Melville Koppies, a small protected reserve. The chief road that cuts through Melville's business area, Beyers Naude Drive. Currently, Melville has faced decline as several businesses relocate back into the newly renovated Newtown area in the city centre.

West of Melville is Westdene and Sophiatown, once one of the most vibrant black suburbs in the city. Considered a criminal and political hotbed, the entire suburb was razed to the ground in the 1950s. A white suburb of Triomf, meaning "triumph" in Afrikaans, was constructed in its place. The only remaining original Sophiatown building is the Anglican Church of Christ the King. The area has since reintroduced the use of its original name.

== Southern suburbs ==
The southern suburbs, located in Regions 9, 10, and 11, extend to the south of the inner city, and are somewhat isolated from the rest of Johannesburg. On a map, the southern suburbs appear to hang down from the border of Soweto and Johannesburg South. It is about 40 kilometres south of the inner city. It is actually the most isolated, least integrated area of Johannesburg, with its east, west, and southern boundaries also forming Johannesburg proper's boundaries in the area. It is diagonally traversed by the N1, with the N12 running along its northern border.

The southern suburbs tend to be either solely industrial or solely residential, with most residents in the residential areas being long-term residents in well-established communities. The majority of houses in these formal settlements are included in one of Johannesburg's lowest income brackets. At the extreme south end of the city, there are extremely large informal settlements, such as Orange Farm, which suffer from widespread poverty and unemployment, which are compounded by their isolation from the rest of the city, which in turn makes it costly to extend much-needed infrastructure from the more integrated suburbs.

A significant amount of underdeveloped and vacant agricultural land is publicly owned, and the city government is currently in the process of selling large tracts of it for development, which is hoped to provide jobs for the residents of the informal settlements. Rand Stadium, the oldest football stadium in the city, is located in the southern suburb of Rosettenville.

Turffontein was the largest concentration camp in Johannesburg during the Second Boer War. The camp was located where the Turffontein Racecourse is now, and held about 5,000 people. The 700 who died of that group are buried at the Suideroord Concentration Camp Cemetery which was on a farm called Klipriviersberg and which is now the suburb of Winchester Hills. The racecourse hosts the Summer Cup one of three major races in South Africa.

== Notes ==
1. SouthAfrica.info: Transport in Johannesburg
2. Address by Gauteng Public Transport, Roads, and Works MEC
3. City of Johannesburg: Bus Services
4. City of Johannesburg: Reshaping Johannesburg's inner city
5. Johannesburg, South Africa City Guide
6. Andrew Maykuth Online: Post-apartheid, downtown decays
7. South African Government Information: Address at the launch of the CCTV Anti-Crime Initiative
8. ICLEI: Addressing Poverty in Johannesburg, South Africa
9. Out of Home: Micro-loan for commuters
10. City of Johannesburg: Johannesburg Housing Company counts its success
11. Johannesburg Landmarks
12. City of Johannesburg: About Region 7
13. Wetlands: Revamping the Jukskei River
14. City of Johannesburg: Zooming in on the dirty water 'hotspots'
15. South African Government Information: ASMAL: Tree planting ceremony
16. City of Johannesburg: Development Projects
17. Why the townships turned into war zones
18. Encyclopædia Britannica's Guide to Black History: Soweto
19. Business Times: Trashing the northern suburbs to bring equality to the new SA
20. BootsnAll: Johannesburg, South Africa
21. safrica.info: We're living in an urban forest
22. Location of the Suideroord Concentration Camp Cemetery 26°16′21″S 28°01′27″E
