= Survivor South Africa: Champions =

- Season 5
- Presented by: Nico Panagio
- No. of days: 27
- No. of castaways: 20
- Winner: Graham Jenneker
- Runner-up: Buhle Madlala
- Location: Johor, Malaysia
- No. of episodes: 18

Release
- Original network: M-Net
- Original release: January 19 – May 18, 2014

Additional information
- Filming dates: October 2013 – October 2013

Season chronology
- ← Previous; Maldives Next → Philippines

Survivor South Africa: Champions is the fifth season of the South African reality competition show Survivor South Africa. The series was filmed in October 2013 and aired weekly between January and May 2014 on M-Net. This was the second season to be filmed in Johor state of Malaysia, following Survivor South Africa: Malaysia, and the third to be hosted by Nico Panagio.

This season featured 20 contestants being led by two of South Africa's sporting champions while competing for 27 days. The champions joining the 20 contestants were former Springbok rugby captain Corné Krige and former Bafana Bafana player Mark Fish. As tribe captains, they drafted the two initial tribes, competed in all the team challenges pre-merge, involved themselves in tribal life, and attended Tribal Council. However, they could not vote or be voted for at Tribal Council. Once the tribes merged, the Champions were removed from the islands and placed on the jury, where they must compete in duels for the Salvation Cup, which the winning captain can use to negate a single vote at Tribal Council. The captains attended the final Tribal Council and cast a vote for the Ultimate Survivor. The champions also competed for a separate prize of R 500,000 Rand, as decided by a vote from the South African viewing audience.

On May 18, 2014, Graham Jenneker was voted the "Ultimate Survivor" in a 5-3-2 jury vote over runner-up Buhle Madlala and 2nd runner-up Sivu Xabanisa. It was also announced that Corné Krige was the winning captain after eight weeks of public voting.

== Contestants ==
The cast is composed of 20 players, initially divided into two tribes of ten in a schoolyard pick by the champions: Selatan (South in Malay), led by Corné Krige, and Utara (North in Malay), led by Mark Fish. On Day 12, the castaways participated in a surprise tribe swap. On Day 18, the two tribes merged into one tribe Juara, named after the Malay language word of Champions.

Alongside the support of Krige and Fish, the tribes could win additional challenge assistants: South African sporting legends and personalities Jimmy Tau, Makhaya Ntini, Jonty Rhodes, Carol Tshabalala and Derek Alberts.

Contestant	Original tribe	Switched tribe	Merged tribe	Finish
Ashleigh Bryant; 22, Pinelands, Western Cape	Selatan			1st voted out Day 3
Marsha Wessels; 40, Retreat, Western Cape	Selatan			2nd voted out Day 5
Killarney Jones; 44, Benoni, Gauteng	Utara			3rd voted out Day 7
Zan Lang; 24, East London, Eastern Cape	Utara			4th voted out Day 9
Shona MacDonald; 24, Craigavon, Gauteng	Selatan			5th voted out Day 9
Philip Dickson; 32, Durban, KwaZulu-Natal	Selatan			6th voted out Day 11
Gena Alkana; 29, Sea Point, Western Cape	Selatan	Utara		7th voted out Day 13
Sonette Myburgh; 40, Witpoortjie, Gauteng	Utara	Utara		8th voted out Day 15
Stephen Walker; 25, Johannesburg, Gauteng	Utara	Utara		9th voted out Day 17
Marian de Vos; 25, Lonehill, Gauteng	Utara	Utara	Juara	10th voted out 1st jury member Day 19
Solly Mathiba; 32, Kathu, Northern Cape	Utara	Selatan	Juara	11th voted out 2nd jury member Day 20
Moyra Makina; 34, Claremont, Western Cape	Selatan	Selatan	Juara	12th voted out 3rd jury member Day 21
Vel Bodiba; 26, Mabopane, Gauteng	Utara	Selatan	Juara	13th voted out 4th jury member Day 21
Shane Hattingh; 42, Bryanston, Gauteng	Utara	Utara	Juara	14th voted out 5th jury member Day 22
Altaaf Sheik; 29, Durban, KwaZulu-Natal	Selatan	Selatan	Juara	15th voted out 6th jury member Day 24
Zavion Kotze; 25, Johannesburg, Gauteng	Selatan	Selatan	Juara	16th voted out 7th jury member Day 25
David de Wet; 53, Roosevelt Park, Gauteng	Selatan	Utara	Juara	17th voted out 8th jury member Day 26
Sivu Xabanisa; 23, Khayelitsha, Western Cape	Utara	Utara	Juara	2nd runner-up
Buhle Madlala; 35, Northcliff, Gauteng	Utara	Selatan	Juara	Runner-up
Graham Jenneker; 28, Bellville, Western Cape	Selatan	Selatan	Juara	Ultimate Survivor

=== Future appearances ===
Killarney Jones, Marian de Vos, Philip Dickson, Shane Hattingh and Shona MacDonald returned to compete again in Survivor South Africa: Return of the Outcasts in 2022.

=== Champions ===
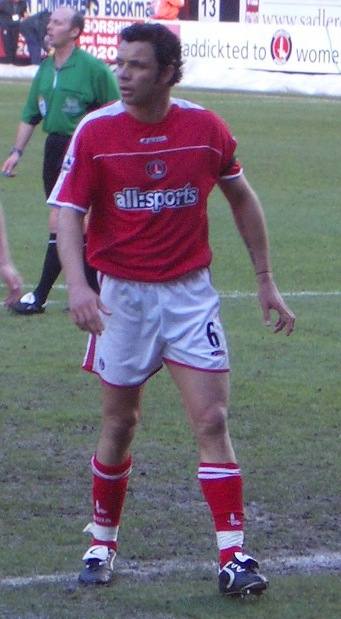
Mark Fish

Alongside the support of Krige and Fish, the tribes could win additional challenge assistants: South African sporting legends and personalities Jimmy Tau, Makhaya Ntini, Jonty Rhodes, Carol Tshabalala and Derek Alberts.

Champion	Original tribe	Switched tribe (Note: After the surprise Tribe Shuffle, the captains were allowed to barter for castaways on their new tribe, or choose to switch tribes.)	Merged tribe	Finish
Mark Fish; 39, Cape Town; Former Bafana Bafana defender	Utara	Utara	Salvation (Note: The captains were removed from the game, but performed in Salvation duels to assist castaways at Tribal Council. They would attend Tribal Council as part of the Jury throughout the merge.)	Losing coach 9th jury member
Corné Krige; 38, Cape Town; Former Springbok rugby captain	Selatan	Selatan	Salvation	Winning coach 10th jury member

== Season summary ==
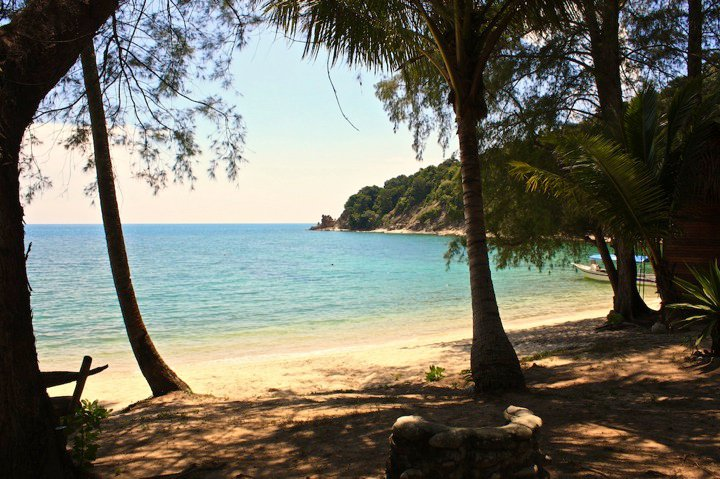
The season was filmed in Johor in Malaysia.

The 20 new castaways were divided into two tribes via schoolyard pick by captains Corné Krige and Mark Fish: Selatan and Utara. Corné and Mark respectively joined Selatan and Utara to assist in camp life and challenges, but without the power to vote at Tribal Council. At Selatan, Corné struggled against a Rugrats alliance (led by Graham, Altaaf, Gena, and Moyra) who voted against his suggestions, while Mark sat back and let Utara play their strategic game without his interference. After a tribe shuffle, Selatan went on an immunity run, which protected the former Utara minority of Buhle, Solly, and Vel until the merge. Shane and Marian kept a strong hold on the new Utara tribe, voting out two of their own allies and stealing an idol in the process.

When the two tribes merged, the captains were removed from the camp life to compete in Salvation Cup duels. The winning captain at these duels would be able to nullify a vote at Tribal Council for any player before the vote is revealed. The merge saw the Rugrats controlling the votes over two warring Utara factions, but as the Rugrats grew complacent, their leader Graham led a series of short-term voting blocs to blindside his own allies and both Utara factions until there were five players remaining.

The final five saw Graham's control of the strategic game be pulled away from him as he and remaining Selatan members, Zavion and David, were blindsided with a successful bluff and idol play by Buhle and Sivu. Buhle also controlled the final four vote in an unsuccessful blindside of Sivu before the Final Tribal Council. The jury criticized all three finalists: Graham, for his betrayal of the Rugrats and mistakes that led to Buhle and Sivu taking control towards the end of the game; Buhle, for her under-the-radar "anyone but me" social game; and Sivu, for letting his unwavering loyalties to Shane and Marian and his general immaturity affect his social game. However, alongside the captains' votes between him and Buhle, Graham managed to earn a 5-3-2 victory over runner-up Buhle, and second runner-up Sivu. Throughout the season, the viewers in South Africa was encouraged to vote between Corné and Mark for who was the better captain, with Corné winning a separate grand prize alongside his Selatan protégé, Graham.

Challenge winners and eliminations by episode
Episode		Challenge winner(s)			Eliminated	Finish
No.	Original air date	Duel	Reward	Immunity	Eliminated	Finish
1	January 19, 2014	Utara	None	Utara	First Tribal Council occurred in the second episode.	
1	January 19, 2014	Selatan	None	Utara	First Tribal Council occurred in the second episode.	
1	January 19, 2014	Utara	None	Utara	First Tribal Council occurred in the second episode.	
2	January 26, 2014	None	Utara	None	Ashleigh	1st voted out Day 3
3	February 2, 2014	Selatan	Selatan	Utara	Marsha	2nd voted out Day 5
4	February 9, 2014	None	Selatan	Selatan	Killarney	3rd voted out Day 7
5	February 16, 2014	Selatan	Utara	None (Note: There was no immunity challenge due to the double Tribal Council.)	Zan	4th voted out Day 9
5	February 16, 2014	Selatan	Utara	None	Shona	5th voted out Day 9
6	February 23, 2014	Selatan	Selatan	Utara	Philip	6th voted out Day 11
7	March 2, 2014	None (Note: There was no duel or reward challenge due to the tribe swap.)		Selatan	Gena	7th voted out Day 13
8	March 9, 2014	None	Utara (Note: The Reward Challenge resulted in a draw, therefore both tribes shared the reward.)	Selatan	Sonette	8th voted out Day 15
8	March 9, 2014	None	Selatan	Selatan	Sonette	8th voted out Day 15
9	March 16, 2014	None	Utara	Selatan	Stephen	9th voted out Day 17
10	March 23, 2014	Mark	None (Note: There was no reward challenge due to the merge.)	Immunity challenge & merge Tribal Council occurred in the eleventh episode.		
11	March 30, 2014	None		Zavion	Marian	10th voted out 1st jury member Day 19
12	April 6, 2014	Corné	Moyra (Note: Combined reward and immunity challenge.)		Solly	11th voted out 2nd jury member Day 20
13	April 13, 2014	Mark	Altaaf		Moyra	12th voted out 3rd jury member Day 21
13	April 13, 2014	None (Note: Immediately after Moyra's elimination, there was another immunity challenge and vote; there was no duel or reward challenge.)		Buhle	Vel	13th voted out 4th jury member Day 21
14	April 20, 2014	Mark	None	Sivu	Shane	14th voted out 5th jury member Day 22
15	April 27, 2014	Corné	Zavion [Altaaf, Graham]	Zavion	Altaaf	15th voted out 6th jury member Day 24
16	May 4, 2014	Mark	Graham [David]	Graham	Zavion	16th voted out 7th jury member Day 25
17	May 11, 2014		Buhle		David	17th voted out 8th jury member Day 26
18	May 18, 2014				Jury vote	
18	May 18, 2014				Sivu	2nd runner-up Day 27
18	May 18, 2014				Buhle	Runner-up; Day 27
18	May 18, 2014				Graham	Ultimate Survivor; Day 27
18	May 18, 2014				Public vote	
18	May 18, 2014				Mark	Losing coach
18	May 18, 2014				Corné	Winning coach

== Episodes ==
No. overall	No. in season	Title	Timeline	Original release date
56	1	"Episode 1"	Days 1-2	January 19, 2014
The twenty civilian castaways were marooned on a raft off an island in the South China Sea. They were pulled onto a boat with supplies, where Nico instructed them to take the supplies onto their raft and reach the shore. Team captains Corné Krige and Mark Fish were awaiting the castaways' arrival. The team captains selected tribes by school yard pick, forming the tribes, Selatan (Krige) and Utara (Fish). Nico explained to the castaways that both Corné and Mark would partake in all challenges and Tribal Councils, but they won't be able to vote until the very end for the winner, alongside the jury.: Captains' Duels: The tribe captains squared off in a series of three challenges on the beach to earn supplies for their tribe. The first round was a beach run for the contents of a treasure chest the castaways managed to take off the boat. The second round consisted of a three part reverse tug-o-war between the tribe captains. In the third part, the captains were allowed to substitute themselves for one of their tribemates (they were playing for bags of rice). The third round was a tradition tower moving puzzle where the tribemates were allowed to verbally help their tribe captain. The final prize was first pick of three sets of items from the boat loot.; When Selatan arrived on their beach, Corné took his tribe aside, encouraging them to not give up, after only winning the tribe all six bags of rice in the morning's challenges against Mark. While building camp, Zavion was on a high from winning some rice in the reward challenge over Solly from Utara. He began to follow Corné and dictate how Selatan's camp should be erected to the irritation of some of his tribemates. Philip, David and Gena, in particular, were annoyed at Zavion's alpha male attitude. However, they each recognized his strength was useful in the pre-merge game. Over on Utara, Zan was also ruffling feathers with his take-charge demeanour around camp, but Mark tried to establish a positive tribe dynamic for the sake of future tribe challenge wins. The first day ended with both tribes huddled under their shelters as a tropical storm hit them. The castaways used this time to bond and set aside their differences for the time being.: Immunity Challenge: Both tribes would race out into the water and swim around the back of a ship wreck. They would then dive down and collect a rope net. Using a rope ladder, the tribes would climb up on to the deck and use the net to wrap it around their chest. Once the chest was in the net, the tribes would toss the chest into the water and swim to the ship mast. Once the tribe reached the mast, the Champions would climb up a rope ladder and retrieve a key. Once back down, the tribes would swim to shore and place the chest on their platform. They would use the key to unlock the chest to retrieve a grappling hook. They would use the hook to pull a ring which would raise the tribe flag. The first tribe to finish wins immunity.
57	2	"Episode 2"	Day 3	January 26, 2014
After the first immunity challenge, Utara celebrated their victory with Mark highlighting Solly's efforts in the challenge. Meanwhile, Corné advised Selatan to not give up and vote for the weakest tribe member at the first Tribal Council. Zavion pushed for the tribe to vote off David or Shona, as the two weakest members of the tribe. Philip, Marsha and Ashleigh were roped in to form an inner-circle alliance. However, when Marsha tried to recruit Moyra and Graham, she began to lie about placements in the alliance. Graham started approaching the rest of Selatan to form a counter alliance with Altaaf, Gena, David, Shona and Moyra. Amongst the scrambling, Philip managed to find sugar cane on the Selatan beach, and stored it away from the rest of the camp. When Moyra stumbled upon Philip, he wanted to curry favour with her. Over at Utara, Killarney headed the construction of the tribe's shelter as a means to put herself in a good light, while the men of Utara struggled to make fire. Philip, Corné and Zavion managed to get fire for Selatan into the evening of Day 2. Towards the end of the evening, Ashleigh felt that she needed to step away from Zavion's alliance, unaware that the counter alliance was targeting her.: Reward Challenge: The tribe captains privately had to pick two tribe members that they felt would be the first voted out at their respective tribal councils. With one castaway as an unaware advisor. The two castaways have to pull a large chain from the beach that leads to a fire starting kit. Once they have uncovered the fire kit, they have to build a fire with it to light a torch. The first tribe to light a fire circle with their lit torch wins, a fire starting kit for their tribe. Both pairs received a clue to a Hidden Immunity Idol at their respective camps.; Buhle and Sonette from Utara felt betrayed by Mark's choice of sending them to the reward challenge, vowing to forge a duo between the two of them, especially after winning the fire starting kit for the tribe. David and Shona also agreed to stick with each other, as Shona was the only person on Selatan that could tolerate David. They explained to Nico at the challenge that they were expecting to be one of the first to be voted off the island. After their loss in the challenge, Shona and David devised a plan to find the immunity idol when they returned to camp by distracting the tribe with Shona crying on the beach, and David searching for the idol. They succeeded and decided to keep the idol for themselves, without letting any of the major alliances know that they possessed it. Tribal Council arrived at the end of Day 3, with the counter alliance gathering enough traction to uproot Zavion's group and voting off Ashleigh, to the utmost surprise of Corné and Zavion.
58	3	"Episode 3"	Days 4-5	February 2, 2014
Returning from Tribal Council, Zavion lashed out at the rest of the tribe for voting out his closest ally, Ashleigh. Moyra and Gena explained that his and Marsha's gameplay forced a "Rugrats Alliance" to form to counter his own. Corné was left stunned at what happened, and expressed that he had much to learn about the social game of Survivor and how to balance that with trying to get Selatan to the end. Over at Utara, Shane and Stephen managed to catch and kill a small shark, to the anger of Zan as he was a conservationist. Zavion and Marsha decided to stay together while being at the bottom of the Selatan tribe.: Reward Challenge: The two tribes had to split into three groups of three. The first three swam out to platforms off the beach with a rope attached to a giant wench that the second three managed. At the platform, there are three boxes full of puzzle pieces that have to be pulled to shore by the wench team. Once all three boxes have landed at the beach, the boxes get opened for the puzzle team. The puzzle three have to arrange a portrait puzzle of Ching Shih and hang them to a structure also linked to the wench. The first tribe to raise their puzzle in the correct order and gathered back at the wench wins a complete set of fishing gear.; Sonette expressed frustration at Mark and the rest of Utara for their first defeat, because she believed her strength in puzzles could have won the tribe the reward challenge. Mark apologized to the tribe about not sorting out the decision of who gets to sit out properly before the challenge. Sivu gathered that there should be an immunity idol hidden around the camp akin to his favourite player, Russell Hantz. He found it hidden in a tree, but he left it there. His alliance mate, Shane, followed afterwards and took it. Sonette and Buhle started looking for as well, but they came to the conclusion that someone else might have found it. Shane used the idol to secure his true alliance with Marian, and consolidated an alliance with Sivu and Stephen without them knowing about his idol.: Captains' Duel: The tribe captains had to dig into the sand for a machete. They must use this machete to cut down five ropes to release their tribe's ball down a chute. The first ball to fall down the chute and land in Jimmy Tau's hands wins Jimmy Tau's service in the immunity challenge.; Immunity Challenge: The tribe must select three tribe members to act as defenders on two balancing structures above the water. The rest of the tribe and captains have to shoot soccer balls from the shipwreck deck to the goal out in the water. Out of three rounds, each team has ten opportunities to score goals. If a defender falls off their structure, they have to get back up again. The tribe with the most goals by the end of the three rounds, wins immunity.; Corné won the duel for Selatan, but Utara won immunity again; back at their camp, Mark and Utara celebrated Buhle's effort after the challenge. Selatan started to scramble to decide who from Zavion's alliance to vote out next. Corné again openly stepped aside from the tribe's politics to let themselves decide. Altaaf informed Gena and Moyra that Marsha started lying to members of the Rugrats alliance about the young girls aiming to vote out the older people in the tribe. Moyra brought up the chance that someone has an immunity idol to use, while David and Shona remained silent to their possession of the idol from their alliance. Zavion, knowing his alliance was doomed, decided to offer Marsha and Philip as a means to let the Rugrats flush out any possible hidden immunity idol. His planning succeeded with a stunned Philip receiving four votes and Marsha sent packing for her negative scrambling.
59	4	"Episode 4"	Days 6-7	February 9, 2014
After what came across as a surprise split vote for Philip the night before, he vowed to do whatever he could to improve his position in the Selatan tribe. His main focus was to prove his own worth around camp in comparison to David, the tribe's outcast. On the Utara beach, Zan and Killarney complained about the lack of work ethic around camp and brought the issue to Mark. The tribe continued expressing their frustrations about Zan as he caught and released a water monitor stating to his tribe to not kill land creatures he found for food. Shane and Marian started to notice Killarney's social presence in their tribe, especially as she was not part of their alliance.: Reward Challenge: Three pairs from the tribe have to carry a coconut each while balancing it on two poles through an obstacle course before dropping it off to the next pair of tribemates. If the coconut falls, they have to restart the obstacle they were on. No touching allowed unless placing the coconut on the poles in the beginning, if the coconut has fallen and once finishing the last obstacle. The last three tribemates have to take those three coconuts and attach them to chained swings. Using the coconut swings one at a time to knock down seven varying raised pots away from the platform. The first tribe to knock all seven pots wins blankets, pillows, hammocks and other bedding items.; After their second Reward Challenge loss, Utara fell into an argument between Mark and Sivu about Mark's leadership in deciding who in the tribe does what in the challenge. The argument became explosive and left Sivu walking away in tears with Killarney and the others trying to explain to Mark about the situation better. However, as Sivu walked away from the beach to gather his thoughts, he delivered tree mail stating that the tribes would have an immunity challenge the same day.: Immunity Challenge: With their tribe captains locked up in a bamboo cage, the tribe have to pull a mast from the shore using loose chain links. The mast has a tangled set of ropes which hold the key to release a torch attached to the captain's cage. Once the tribe has placed the mast in its position and begin to unravel the rope, the tribe captain can start digging their way out. The tribe can only help dig out their tribe captain once the key has been released. The tribe captain then has to take the torch, light it in a fire by the shore and make it across to a giant man structure and set it on fire. The first tribe to set the Burning Man alight wins immunity.; Utara were devastated by a more unified Selatan and were sent packing to attend their first Tribal Council. In the night, Killarney started rallying as many people as she could to vote off Zan, as his negative attitude and general disregard for camp life had started to rub her the wrong way. She tried to rope in Buhle and Vel into the fold. However, Shane, Stephen and Marian saw the danger that Killarney was becoming to their alliance; they told Killarney that they were with her on voting Zan, but secretly planned her downfall instead of voting off the weakest member, Vel. Meanwhile, Buhle started to feel mistrust with Sonette after she wouldn't share the idol clue with her, ditching Killarney's efforts and rallying Vel and Solly into the fold. Sivu felt split between his original alliance, which he didn't trust, and Buhle's outsider alliance, while Sonette and Stephen individually revealed Killarney's politicking to Zan. Selatan celebrated their first immunity win and bonded in the camp. However, the divide between David and the rest of Selatan grew larger. Shona and David privately argued about the fact that he wouldn't show her where he hid the idol they shared. Instead of her revealing to the tribe about David possessing the idol, they consolidated their alliance, and Shona's main priority was to make sure that David wouldn't flip at the merge if they were in the slight majority. Tribal Council arrived at the end of Day 7, with Mark telling Nico that he also stepped away from the politicking, stating that his main focus for now was to get Utara as far in the game as a tribe as possible. Sonette talked about a lack of trust in the tribe and that she considered her vote to be an initiation to the majority alliance, while Buhle revealed that she had lost trust with Sonette, to Sonette's utter shock. Killarney brought up bringing the tribe back together before entertaining any proper alliances, unaware that the majority had targeted her. Ultimately, though Buhle's outsiders targeted Sonette and Killarney voted for Zan, Killarney was blindsided from the game.
60	5	"Episode 5"	Days 8-9	February 16, 2014
After their first Tribal Council, Buhle came clean to the entire tribe about her falling out with Sonette involving the hidden immunity idol. Selatan shared some sorely needed unity after avoiding Tribal Council for the first time.: Captains' Duel: The Captains selected a tribe member to take part in the Duel. Turn by turn, the castaways have to throw coconuts over their heads and a tall bamboo curtain into a basket. The first tribe to get three coconuts into their basket wins the services of Makhaya Ntini for the Reward Challenge.; Reward Challenge: One tribe member have to throw coconuts at a tile holding a wooden ladder. When the ladder has been released, two at a time, the tribes must use the ladder to climb a wooden structure to push over one crate of coconuts each. The tribes must push over six crates. Lastly, the tribe must take turns to break ten targets with their crate coconuts. The tribe that breaks all ten targets first wins a chocolate cake and bags of spices, salt, garlic, sugar and peppers.; After the Reward challenge, Stephen confronted Sonette about the idol, unaware that his own alliance already had it. This signified the alienation of Solly, Buhle and Vel from the rest of the tribe. Over in Utara, Zan confided with Buhle that he wanted to leave the island, but Marian took it upon herself to hide some of Zan's shorts during the night to annoy him. On Day 9, both tribes received treemail indicating that they will both be going to Tribal Council that night. Zan immediately informed the tribe that he wished for the rest of the tribe to vote him out of the game. Solly was frustrated by Zan's selfishness, and Mark was also upset, as Zan was the tribe's main provider. Stephen suggested to Shane that their alliance disregard Zan's wishes and target Buhle instead, knowing that whatever the outcome, Zan will leave at some point. Stephen planned to flush an idol if Buhle had it, so that Zan would leave anyway; he informed Vel of his intentions. However at a tense Tribal Council, Zan retaliated from his pants being taken by stealing the tribe's flint and handing it over to Buhle to keep in case they voted her out. Mark and the rest of the tribe expressed their disappointment with Zan and proceeded to vote him out unanimously. Over at Selatan, the Rugrats alliance with Shona decided that David needed to leave the game or else he would continue to drag the tribe down in challenges. Shona suggested that they blindside David, with the motive that she would then be the only person in Selatan who would know where the Idol was hidden on the Island. Gena isolated David about the possibility of him possessing an idol, and he came clean to her that he did in fact have it. During this period, Shona claimed the idol from David's hiding spot for herself. David's suspicions of the vote got the better of him and when he discovered the idol was removed, he confronted Shona in front of the entire tribe about it, revealing to everyone that she knew. Philip was elated about Shona's blunder as it gave him a few more days on the island. Selatan gave Corné the idol for him to decide when it shall be used and kept out of the hands of the tribe. At Tribal Council, the Rugrats, Philip and Zavion all united to vote off Shona due to her breach of trust with David and the idol.
61	6	"Episode 6"	Days 10-11	February 23, 2014
After voting off their biggest provider in Zan, Utara’s morale was down; meanwhile, Selatan’s mood was better, as the tribe bonded over a yoga session.: Reward Challenge: Each tribe was divided into two groups of four; from the first group, the person at the top of a set of stairs would pour water out of a bucket into a hollow bamboo stick held by the other three players. The water would travel through the chute into a pot; once the pot is full enough, a scale will tip and open a crate. When the pot completely touches the ground, the remaining four tribe members will take a set of puzzle pieces out of said crate and build a puzzle. The first tribe to complete their puzzle won burgers and fries.; Marian sat out for Utara, and Selatan won the challenge, enjoying their reward at the challenge site and lifting their spirits further. Treemail announced another captains' duel with each captain bringing "an able assistant", but its vague wording gave Selatan the idea that a member from the opposing tribe could be swapped. Solly advocated for Shane to go with Mark, as he felt that Shane was a physical threat and "all talk". Meanwhile, Zavion went with Corné for Selatan upon group consensus.: Captains' Duel: Captains must balance a cup of water on a peg, with more pegs being added over time, making it more difficult to balance the cup. The winning captain gets assistance from cricket superstar Jonty Rhodes for the next immunity challenge.; Corné outlasted Mark to win the duel for Selatan. The Selatan tribe members were overjoyed to see Jonty Rhodes arriving at their camp, and their happiness rose even further upon opening a chest containing a food reward.: Immunity Challenge: Jonty for Selatan and a counterpart for Utara would be the strikers. They must throw coconuts to break a tile, releasing a key. Upon giving the key to the rest of the tribe, the strikers move to another mat while the tribe goes into the water onto a ship. They must use the key to unlock a chest on the ship. The chest contains water balls that the tribe must work together to get up to the captains on the crow's nest. The captains will then send the water balls down for the strikers to smash. The first tribe to smash five water balls wins immunity.; Utara appointed Solly to be their striker. Despite assistance from Jonty for Selatan, Utara pulled out the win, which improved their outlook. Though David was still a common target, Graham pitched to David and Moyra that they vote out Philip. Meanwhile, Philip was eager to split up the Rugrats alliance by voting out Moyra, who he perceived to be the leader of the alliance. He attempted to rope in Zavion, who showed hesitance to commit, which angered Philip. He tried to appeal to Corné for the idol, but the leader was apprehensive about playing it so early in the game. At Tribal Council, Philip attempted to throw Moyra under the bus about his sharing sugarcane with her on Day 2, but Zavion voiced his distaste for Philip due to that, leading to an argument. Philip was then unanimously voted off.
62	7	"Episode 7"	Days 12-13	March 2, 2014
A rainstorm rolled into both camps, and on Utara, Sonette was injured by a falling beam from the shelter. Solly was infuriated by Shane’s careless construction of the shelter from earlier, which he felt led to the accident. Over at Selatan, Corné expressed disappointment in Moyra for taking part in Philip’s withholding food from the rest of the tribe, as did Graham, who considered working with Altaaf over her. Treemail alluded to a possible tribe swap, and when the tribes convened, Nico announced he would ask tribe members questions over their personal feelings and thoughts towards tribemates; the captains wouldn’t take part in the first part of the exercise. Nico would ask the group the same questions, and the castaways would predict whose name came up the most. This indeed created the two swapped tribes. Selatan now consisted of Altaaf, Buhle, Graham, Moyra, Solly, Vel, and Zavion. Utara consisted of David, Gena, Marian, Shane, Sivu, Sonette, and Stephen. The Captains then got their pick of which tribe to lead, as well as the option to have individual players switch tribes. No transfers were made, and the Captains each stuck with their respective original tribes. Upon arriving at camp, an emotional Gena worried about her standing within her new tribe as one of only two original Selatan members (the other being David) on the new Utara. The new Selatan members (especially Buhle, Solly, and Vel) celebrated their new camp. Moyra tried to convince Corné to plant his idol into Gena’s bag that she left at camp, so at the immunity challenge, she would receive the idol to keep her safe on the new Utara tribe.: Immunity Challenge: One tribe member will run from a battle zone to a sandbag in the water. Upon arriving back at shore, the sandbag becomes fair game, as three defenders must help their retriever take the sandbag back to their tribe’s colored point in the battle zone; touching their mat and the sandbag simultaneously results in a point for their tribe. Retrievers must rotate, while defenders must be evenly matched in gender (no more than two male defenders in any round), and everyone on the tribe must get a chance to participate in the challenge. The first tribe to three points wins immunity.; At the challenge, Corné gave David and Gena their bags, but his coded message to Gena raised red flags with Marian, who surmised that Gena was being given an idol. Selatan won immunity. Gena found the idol in her bag, while Marian plotted with Shane to have her distracted so that they could go through her bag. Sonette and Stephen distracted Gena while Shane took the idol from her bag and directed David to find a replacement stone. Marian and Shane delusionally felt the idol was truly theirs after they stole it from Gena’s bag. Gena checked her bag again and found the idol was gone; she talked to David about it, who played dumb about the situation, as did Shane. Marian privately gloated about stealing an idol. At Tribal Council, Gena countered Shane’s claim that unity was Utara’s biggest strength. Ultimately, Gena was unanimously voted out, with Marian and Shane celebrating their scheme.
63	8	"Episode 8"	Days 14-15	March 9, 2014
David thanked the rest of the Utara tribe for keeping him in the game before Shane told him to keep the perception that he was on the outs. Sonette felt paranoid that she would be targeted for elimination before David due to her perceived weakness in challenges. Stephen told Marian and Shane he thought Sonette had an idol. He grew wary of his two allies after they stole Gena’s idol before voting her out. Treemail alluded to a possible blindfolded challenge; Utara planned out their approach with Marian as the caller, and she arrogantly said that Selatan had muscle but no brains. Upon arriving at the reward challenge, the Selatan members were disappointed to see Gena was voted out.: Reward Challenge: Castaways must remember five rounds worth of symbols shown to them before Nico directs them into the jungle to find the matching symbol and bring it back to Nico. After finding and touching the item on the symbol, they must shout their tribe’s name to score a point. The tribe that wins a round wins the respective fruit rewards for that round.; Selatan led 2-1 going into the fourth round, but Utara objected to Selatan winning the fourth round, as Altaaf possibly called out his tribe’s name too early. Upon further review, Nico declared the round a draw, meaning the two tribes would share that round’s reward. Utara won the final round, making the final score 2-2-1. Zavion told Altaaf his belief that David betrayed Gena, and Graham believed that one of Gena’s tribemates stole it from her bag. At Utara, Stephen asked Sonette if she had an idol, to which she said no. Stephen relayed the conversation to Marian, unaware that Sonette was listening in. Shane talked to Marian about voting off Sonette, but David’s snoring at night made Shane reconsider.: Immunity Challenge: Tribes will swim out to the back of a ship and climb up. Once every tribe member is on the deck, two members will climb down onto a raft while the rest of the tribe throws coconuts down to them. When all the coconuts are on the raft, every tribe member must be on the raft before paddling back to shore. Tribes will then hook their raft to a post and unload their coconuts; they will then fire the coconuts from a slingshot to hit three targets in a line on a 3x3 grid. Anyone can shoot and assist, but only two members can be on the firing mat at any given time. The first tribe to hit three targets in a line wins immunity.; Selatan edged out Utara for immunity, and they celebrated another win at their camp. Shane was angry that Sonette kept dragging them down at the challenge, and he talked to Sivu about voting her out. Shane eventually decided to just tell Sonette that she was to be voted out next, which she understood. Stephen caught a small shark for the tribe before questioning Marian over her promise to Sonette that she would be safe until the final five. Marian proceeded to mock and verbally attack Stephen behind his back about his thoughts over her stealing Gena’s idol. Marian then threw Stephen under the bus to Sonette, who took the idol for herself and sought to eliminate Stephen by herself. At Tribal Council, David revealed the fact that Gena’s idol was stolen, and Shane admitted to the act, while Marian expressed no remorse over the theft. Sonette said she held the idol in her possession because she felt certain she was the next to go. She then disclosed that her vote would be the only one that counts if she were to use the idol. However, Sonette did not use the idol, and she was voted out unanimously.
64	9	"Episode 9"	Days 16-17	March 16, 2014
Marian continued to privately taunt Stephen over his claim that he had nothing to do with Gena’s idol being stolen by the rest of the original Utara.: Reward Challenge: Assisted by Derek Alberts (Selatan) and Carol Tshabalala (Utara), who are strapped into a large ball, four blindfolded tribe members will guide the ball through a maze. Then, the other two blindfolded tribe members will guide a smaller ball through a wobbly maze, with Derek and Carol moving higher up to assist them in that stage. The first tribe to finish wins a food and shower reward.; Selatan was surprised to see David survived the last Tribal Council, and hoped to use Utara’s dissension to their advantage when the tribes would merge. Utara won reward. Marian and Shane confirmed their intention to go to the final two. Back at camp, Stephen caught more fish for the tribe, while Selatan ran out of food. The weather and mosquitoes made night 16 a tough one for Utara. The next morning, Graham considered blindsiding Zavion in order to keep Buhle and Vel’s trust by keeping Solly, who was the target for most of the original Selatan members.: Immunity Challenge: Two tribe members will send cannonballs down a chute with a ramp at the end of it, while the other four will position the chute to aim for five tiles. Each tribe has only 12 cannonballs. The first tribe to smash all five tiles or the tribe with the most tiles smashed at the end of the 12 cannonballs wins immunity.; Selatan won their third straight immunity challenge. Marian felt threatened by Stephen’s potential at the merge and discussed blindsiding him with Shane. A conversation with Marian reduced Stephen’s trust in her. Marian instructed David to act like he was to be voted off, so that they could unanimously blindside Stephen. At Tribal Council, Stephen was indeed blindsided in another unanimous vote.
65	10	"Episode 10"	Day 18	March 23, 2014
Reduced to a tribe of four, Utara expressed concern of how the merge will play out with the seven-strong Selatan. Shane hoped that sending Stephen home before the merge would be enough of an olive branch to Buhle to reunite the Utara tribe with David as their number for a majority. After treemail instructed the tribes to pack all their belongings, the castaways felt that the merge was arriving. Marian selfishly claimed sole possession of the idol she and Shane stole from Gena. The castaways convened at a table that had a red flag with the word "Juara" on it, signaling the new merged tribe. Also on the table was a large celebratory feast. Nico announced the merge, but the two captains got purple buffs instead of red, and the new tribe’s camp would be at a new beach a short distance away from the feast. Camp valuables from Selatan and Utara would be there, along with construction tools to build a new shelter. During the feast, Zavion started to openly discuss tribe dynamics, which Shane felt uncomfortable with. Shane felt that Graham was the biggest threat out of the Selatan members. Meanwhile, Nico took the captains to another area to reveal that their time at camp with the rest of the castaways was over, as Selatan and Utara were no more. Instead, the captains would view immunity challenges and Tribal Councils and take part in duels for the Salvation Cup, which would negate one vote against a castaway of their choice.: Captains' Duel: Captains will balance a statue on a pole and try to knock their opponent’s statue into the water first to score a point. The first to three wins.; Mark shut out Corné to win the duel. Shane’s barking out orders on how to build the shelter got on his tribemates’ (especially Solly’s) nerves, while Marian did not contribute to helping build the shelter in any capacity. Graham sought to eliminate Sivu first, while Sivu tried to bring Buhle, Solly, and Vel back into his alliance. Zavion asked David if any idols were played at the Tribal Council where Gena was voted out, and David's quick response that Gena didn’t have an idol in her bag made Zavion believe that David stole it from her bag. Graham tried to convince David that the original Utara members on the swapped Selatan tribe were with them, so that David would side with Graham’s alliance, but David questioned Graham on whether he could trust him or not. David pulled Solly aside with a plan to blindside Zavion, but it only made Shane believe that David was too much of a loose cannon to keep around. Zavion aligned with Buhle, while Shane and Marian tried to strongarm Solly into staying Utara strong against the original Selatan members, but Solly wanted to stick with Selatan instead.
66	11	"Episode 11"	Day 19	March 30, 2014
The next morning, Shane buried one of his idols by the water well. Zavion contemplated between voting out Marian or David, while Sivu told Solly about the stolen idol, causing Solly to distrust Shane and Marian.: Immunity Challenge: Castaways will scoop salt into a bowl and balance it on top of their head while traversing two seesaws. If they touch their bowl or it falls off their head, they must go back to the start. At the end of a third seesaw is an empty bowl that will tip the seesaw when enough salt is poured into it, revealing puzzle pieces. The first castaway to solve their puzzle wins immunity.; Zavion won the first individual immunity challenge. David adamantly insisted he was on board with the old Selatan members, but Graham was skeptical. Shane attempted to cover his tracks by saying he believed there were no idols in play, to the others’ bewilderment. The conversation turned several tribe members against Shane and Marian, the latter of which hypocritically ranted about someone else having an idol and messing her game up. Marian lambasted Buhle, Solly, and Vel for not thinking long term after those three confronted her and Shane about the stolen idol. The others decided to split the votes 4-3 on Shane and Marian, who tried to rally Sivu and David into voting against Graham to force a tie. Graham tried to convince Altaaf to do a split on Marian and Sivu instead, in case both idols were played. Shane came to the conclusion that he would need to play an idol on himself. At Tribal Council, Nico revealed the Salvation Cup to the castaways, presenting the possibility for them to plead their case to the captains if they felt they were in danger of being voted off. Shane continued his bluff that neither he nor Marian had an idol. Marian likewise continued her bluff that she would base her vote on who stole the idol to begin with, even though it was her and Shane themselves. After the votes were cast, Shane asked for the Salvation Cup to be used on him, but Mark used it for Buhle, because he respected her honesty and integrity. Shane then pulled out his "second" idol to give to Marian, who claimed she didn’t know Shane had it. She felt that Shane needed it more than her, so she played it for him before arrogantly calling her game phenomenal and feeling safe. Four votes against Shane were negated, but Marian and Graham were tied at three apiece, with Sivu receiving a vote as well. The remaining castaways voted again (either against Graham or Marian), and though Vel switched her vote to Graham, the alliance against Marian held strong, sending her to the jury.
67	12	"Episode 12"	Day 20	April 6, 2014
After his closest ally was eliminated, Shane stated his embarrassment over playing with the tribemates he was playing with, calling them "children". He was especially disgusted with David, and plotted to sabotage his personal belongings just to get back at him. Shane proceeded to verbally accost David for going against him. Meanwhile, Graham pulled Altaaf aside with a plan to blindside Solly or Buhle to take control of the game. Shane attempted to sway Altaaf to his side. Sivu set up a cricket game for the tribe to bond over.: Reward/Immunity Challenge: Each castaway has a chute full of coconuts. Castaways will grab one coconut from their chute at a time, climb up to the top, and place the coconut at the top of another castaway’s chute of their choice. After ten minutes, the first castaway to empty their chute or the castaway with the fewest coconuts wins immunity and a note containing an advantage in the game.; Solly sought to make sure Zavion would not win the challenge. Moyra won the combined reward and immunity challenge - however Nico offered Moyra a temptation - she could keep the advantage where the lovely Nico was standing or could trade it all in for what is in the box - she chose the box, the box would remained locked until the Finale. Graham expressed concern that Altaaf and Moyra were a tight duo, before approaching Shane about making a bigger move in the game. Solly and his allies agreed to target Shane next, no matter what, and to not scramble at the last minute. Shane searched for, and found, another idol.: Captains' Duel: Captains must construct a house of cards high enough to cross a red line. The first to do so wins the Salvation Cup for the next Tribal Council.; Corné edged out Mark to win the duel. Graham began rallying votes to blindside Solly, but grew paranoid over the possibility that he was going to get blindsided himself. Zavion told him to calm down, while Vel wanted to build a smaller core alliance within the majority. A storm rolled in as Tribal Council started, and everyone admitted they did not feel completely safe (except for Moyra, who had the immunity necklace). Zavion admitted someone else would need the Salvation Cup more than himself, while Altaaf requested it be played for Graham, considering he nearly got voted out last Tribal Council. Corné decided to use Salvation on Solly, considering he could be blindsided as opposed to knowing he would get voted out. No idols were played, and Solly was indeed blindsided, becoming the second member of the jury.
68	13	"Episode 13"	Day 21	April 13, 2014
Zavion disclosed to Shane that Vel and Buhle would likely be the next targets by the majority; Graham aligned with Zavion and Shane, planning to bring in Sivu and David. Graham worried about the possible four-person alliance of Vel, Buhle, Altaaf, and Moyra bringing in Sivu to take control.: Reward/Immunity Challenge: In the first phase, castaways will race down a lane with a long bamboo stick tied to their ankles. The first six to finish move on to the second phase, where they must race across swings without touching the ground (if this happens, they must start from the beginning). The first three to finish move on to the final phase, where they must complete a puzzle. The first to solve it wins immunity, plus coffee and donuts.; Nico announced a twist before Altaaf won the combined reward and immunity challenge. Nico gave him the option to swap out his reward (to be shared with two people) for a bag of rice for the tribe; he chose the rice. Moyra found a sealed note in the bag of rice and gave it to Altaaf, who shared its contents with the tribe. It was a clue to the idol; Sivu was baffled that Altaaf would share something like that with someone else. Altaaf told Graham and Zavion to vote Sivu with him, and the rest of their alliance would vote Vel. After Altaaf walked away, Graham told Zavion he wanted to blindside Buhle or Moyra, planning on bringing in David, Shane, and Sivu.: Captains' Duel: Captains will stand on opposing sides of a disc, facing each other. Nico will release a stick from the disc, and the first captain to catch it scores a point. The first to three wins the Salvation Cup for the next Tribal Council.; Mark won the duel. Altaaf and Moyra were under the impression that the votes would be split between Vel and Sivu. Vel was nervous about her standing within the tribe, as nobody approached her all day, while Moyra felt secure. Graham recognized blindsiding Moyra as a move he needed to make to better his own game, but he was emotional over the thought of losing his closest ally and friend in the game. At Tribal Council, Mark used the Salvation Cup for Moyra due to her noble gesture with the clue. Moyra ultimately got blindsided and became the third member of the jury. The twist Nico alluded to earlier was revealed to be another immunity challenge and elimination vote.: Immunity Challenge: Nico will ask the castaways questions, which they must answer with blocks provided to them. A wrong answer eliminates a castaway who gave that answer, and the last one left standing wins immunity.; Buhle won immunity. The Salvation Cup was not in play for the second vote, and Vel became the fourth member of the jury after Buhle was the only other one to vote with her against Graham.
69	14	"Episode 14"	Day 22	April 20, 2014
Altaaf was stunned that some of his alliance members turned on Moyra, while Shane celebrated staying in the game. However, he and Sivu agreed that they needed to make big moves instead of trusting others to make them so that they would stay in the game. Sivu sought to eliminate Zavion and Graham next. Zavion likewise targeted Shane, who considered bringing in Altaaf to make a move.: Immunity Challenge: Castaways will hang onto a wall with several pegs, some of which will be removed at regular intervals. Castaways are not allowed to touch the top or sides of the wall; if they do so, or fall off the wall, they are out of the challenge.; During the challenge, Nico intermittently tempted the castaways with ice cream, saying they had 30 seconds to step down to take the offer if they wanted to give up their shot at immunity. Shane, Zavion, and Graham took the offer, and Sivu won the challenge.: Captains' Duel: Captains will stand on opposing ends of a log in the water, and they must roll the log to make their opponent fall into the water. The first to score three points wins the Salvation Cup for the next Tribal Council.; Mark won the duel 3-2. Shane targeted Zavion, planning to rope in Sivu (so that he could get Buhle on board) and Graham (so that he could get Altaaf on board). Graham grew frustrated by Altaaf making more rice for himself at camp, but he later urged him, as well as Buhle and David, that Shane was too good a player to keep around. He privately considered turning against Altaaf before Shane. Zavion and David discreetly agreed to vote out Shane. At Tribal Council, Mark used the Salvation Cup for Zavion. Shane, thinking he had Altaaf and Buhle on board with his plan, decided not to use either of his two idols, but he was blindsided when the votes went against him instead, and he joined the jury.
70	15	"Episode 15"	Days 23-24	April 27, 2014
Graham decided he would stand a better chance against David in the finals than he would against Sivu or Altaaf.: Reward Challenge: Castaways have four minutes to gather as much mud as possible and transfer it into their barrel. They can use only their clothes and buffs to gather mud. The castaway with the most mud in their barrel wins all-you-can-eat pizza.; Right before the challenge started, Nico told the castaways to turn around; behind them stood their loved ones: David had his niece while the others had their mothers. Time with their loved ones was also at stake for this challenge. Zavion won reward, and Nico offered for him to share the pizza with the rest of the tribe, but only two of them could bring their loved ones along. To keep it fair, Zavion randomly picked a number between 1 and 10, and the two castaways who guessed the closest would bring their loved ones; Altaaf and Graham correctly guessed five. After the reward came an immediate immunity challenge.: Immunity Challenge: Castaways must grab one scroll at a time and traverse up a column with several obstacles. Once at the top with all five scrolls, they must assemble those scrolls to spell out the name of their merged tribe. The first castaway to do so was Zavion, and he won immunity.; Captains' Duel: Captains will stand on opposing ends of a swinging log, and they must push it until it touches a wooden pole; they must attempt to do so before their opponent does. Captains will switch sides every round. The first to three points wins the Salvation Cup for the next Tribal Council.; Corné won the duel 3-2. At camp, Sivu went through Shane’s shoes and found the idol he left behind. Altaaf targeted Sivu, but Graham and Zavion sought to blindside Altaaf for his strong social game. Sivu did not feel completely secure, but he wanted to save his idol for the next Tribal Council, as the top five was the last time idols could be used, and this would guarantee him top four if he made it past this vote. Seeing that everyone else was still upset with him for eating more rice, Altaaf intentionally spilled a bunch of the tribe's rice all over camp, saying if he were to be voted out, the rice would be gone as well. Buhle told Altaaf that he would go home, so that he would not be blindsided, but this frustrated Zavion, as he wanted it to be a blindside. At Tribal Council, the tribe discussed Altaaf and the rice. Altaaf admitted that he was done dealing with the rest of his tribe, saying he would likely quit if he survived Tribal Council. He proceeded to throw the rest of the rice into the fire; the captains admonished him for his actions, joining Zavion in calling him a spoiled brat. Corné used the Salvation Cup for Sivu, and Altaaf's vote against him was negated. The remaining five votes against Altaaf sent him to the jury.
71	16	"Episode 16"	Day 25	May 4, 2014
Zavion affirmed his desire to reach the end alongside Graham and David, with Sivu as his first target for being a jury threat. David saw Zavion’s attempts to align with him for the final three as disingenuous; he was a swing vote between the alliances of Graham and Zavion, and Buhle and Sivu.: Reward/Immunity Challenge: Castaways will untie three bundles of planks that act as stairs; one at a time, they must use the planks to build a path to their flag. The first to raise their flag wins immunity and an in-camp shower and massage.; Graham won the challenge and chose to share reward with David after sharing coded messages with Zavion; Graham chose David so that he would side with him and Zavion for the vote. After the castaways left the challenge site, Nico and the captains discussed the game’s upcoming conclusion and the remaining players. While on reward, Graham and David targeted Sivu, who had an idol (unbeknownst to the others) and targeted Zavion. Buhle and Sivu agreed that Buhle would need the Salvation Cup so that the opposing alliance would vote against Sivu and he would play his idol. Zavion acted as though he did not have the numbers and pled his case to remain in the game, but Buhle saw this as him being arrogant, while Sivu did not fall for his charade.: Captains’ Duel: For the final Salvation Cup duel, captains will stand on opposite ends of a plank and use their strength to keep themselves above water. The first one to fall in the water loses, and the other captain wins the Salvation Cup for the next Tribal Council.; Mark won the duel. David decided to side with Graham and Zavion. Zavion decided to straight-up tell Sivu that he was the target, out of the respect he had for Sivu and his game, but this only confirmed to Sivu that he would need to play his idol. David, Graham, and Zavion considered the possibility that Sivu or Buhle had an idol, but they agreed to stick with their plan. At Tribal Council, Buhle pled for Mark to use the Salvation Cup for her, and he did so. After the votes were cast, Sivu played his idol to negate three votes against him. Buhle and Sivu's votes against Zavion sent him to the jury.
72	17	"Episode 17"	Day 26	May 11, 2014
After Sivu and Buhle's successful blindside of Zavion, Juara were informed at the final immunity challenge that this season will have a Final Three as opposed to a Final Two.: Reward/Immunity challenge: Each castaway was placed in a squat cage on a raised platform; balancing on top of the cage is a shield that will fall if the castaway stops squatting. The last castaway to keep their shield above their cage wins immunity and a private conversation with the pre-merge tribe captains.; David stepped down from the challenge within the first half hour, and Sivu tried to negotiate a Final 3 deal with Graham in the challenge, but Graham refused to believe him. After three and a half hours of squatting and negotiations, including David volunteering to leave at Final 4 with the captains' approval, Buhle won the final immunity challenge. During her reward with the captains, she was convinced that Sivu was the biggest threat to her game. She decided to convince David that he should fight for a spot with Sivu in a firemaking tiebreaker instead of letting Sivu go straight to Final Tribal Council on Day 27. At Tribal Council, Buhle blindsided Sivu and Graham by convincing David to vote Sivu with her, forcing the tiebreaker between the two former tribemates. However, Sivu defeated David convincingly in the challenge, and after attending 13 Tribal Councils in a row, David was finally sent to the jury.
73	18	"Champions Finale & Reunion"	Day 27	May 18, 2014
Buhle, Graham, and Sivu reflected on the game on the last day before attending the Final Tribal Council. The jury admonished Graham's lack of owning his game, due to the fact he orchestrated blindsides of two of his closest allies (Moyra and Altaaf) and for his loss of control of the game at the last two Tribal Councils to Buhle and Sivu. The jury was split on Sivu's gameplay; some felt he rode on Shane and Marian's coattails and lucked his way into the FTC, while Shane and Zavion felt that his determination in challenges and orchestrating Zavion's blindside earned him the win. When the Captains had their say from the Jury, Mark stepped up for Buhle as a choice over Sivu, sighting his immaturity in the game and at camp was not indicative of the season's theme of Champions, whereas Buhle had to fight from the beginning as Utara's designated weakest player to become an underdog while the power players were taken out one by one. During the Reunion, Graham was announced as the Ultimate Survivor, receiving votes from his Captain, Corné, and all of the original Selatan except for Zavion. After stating that she would vote for her alliance partner Sivu at FTC, Marian shocked the cast and audience with her vote for Graham, stating that Graham overcame the brutal jury questioning that he received and earned her respect. Buhle became the runner-up with her captain's vote as the deciding vote between herself and Sivu's two votes. Also during the reunion, the contents of Moyra's box was revealed to be car keys to a new Jeep Wrangler provided by Mopar. Also, after weeks of public voting, Corné was voted by viewers in South Africa as the winning Captain of the season.

== Voting history ==
	Original tribes						Switched tribes			Merged tribe									
Episode	2	3	4	5		6	7	8	9	11		12	13		14	15	16	17	
Day	3	5	7	9		11	13	15	17	19		20	21 (Note: This was a Double Tribal Council. Following the first round of voting, the remaining players competed in another Immunity Challenge, and paricated in a second round of voting.)		22	24	25	26	
Eliminated	Ashleigh	Marsha	Killarney	Zan	Shona	Philip	Gena	Sonette	Stephen	Tie (Note: The first Tribal Council Vote resulted in a tie. Per the rules, a second vote was held where the castaways involved in the tie would not vote and the remaining castaways could only vote for those who tied.)	Marian	Solly	Moyra	Vel	Shane	Altaaf	Zavion	Tie (Note: The vote resulted in a tie. The non-tied castaways were invited to re-vote between the tied castaways, but they elected to stand by their initial vote, thus forcing a deadlocked tie. As there were only four castaways remaining, the two tied castaways competed in a fire making duel to resolve the tie.)	David
Votes	7–3	5–4	6–3–1	8–1	7–1	6–1	6–1	5–1	4–1	3–3–1–0 (Note: Shane played a hidden immunity idol on himself, therefore four votes against him were not counted.)	6–3	6–2–1 (Note: Corné used the Salvation Cup on Solly, nullifying one of the seven votes against him.)	4–2–1–1 (Note: Mark used the Salvation Cup on Moyra, nullifying one of the five votes against her.)	6–2	4–1–1 (Note: Mark used the Salvation Cup on Zavion, nullifying one of the two votes against him.)	5–0 (Note: Corné used the Salvation Cup on Sivu, nullifying the one vote against him.)	2–0 (Note: Sivu played a hidden immunity idol on himself, therefore three votes against him were not counted.)	2–2	Challenge (Note: The vote resulted in a tie. The non-tied castaways were invited to re-vote between the tied castaways, but they elected to stand by their initial vote, thus forcing a deadlocked tie. As there were only four castaways remaining, the two tied castaways competed in a fire making duel to resolve the tie.)
Voter	Vote																		
Graham	Ashleigh	Marsha			Shona	Philip				~~Shane~~	None (Note: Graham and Marian were not eligible to vote in the second round of voting.)	Solly	Moyra	Vel	Shane	Altaaf	~~Sivu~~	David	
Buhle			Sonette	Zan						Marian	Marian	Shane	Vel	Graham	Shane	Altaaf	Zavion	Sivu	
Sivu			Killarney	Zan			Gena	Sonette	Stephen	Graham	Graham	Solly	Moyra	Vel	Zavion	Altaaf	Zavion	David	Won
David	Ashleigh	Philip			Shona	Philip	Gena	Sonette	Stephen	Marian	Marian	Solly	Moyra	Vel	Shane	Altaaf	~~Sivu~~	Sivu	Lost
Zavion	Shona	Philip			Shona	Philip				~~Shane~~	Marian	Solly	Moyra	Vel	Shane	Altaaf	~~Sivu~~		
Altaaf	Ashleigh	Marsha			Shona	Philip				Sivu	Marian	Solly	Sivu	Vel	Buhle	Sivu			
Shane			Killarney	Zan			Gena	Sonette	Stephen	Graham	Graham	Solly	Moyra	Vel	Zavion				
Vel			Sonette	Zan						~~Shane~~	Graham	David	Graham	Graham					
Moyra	Ashleigh	Philip			Shona	Philip				Marian	Marian	Solly	Vel						
Solly			Sonette	Zan						~~Shane~~	Marian	Shane							
Marian			Killarney	Zan			Gena	Sonette	Stephen	Graham	None								
Stephen			Killarney	Zan			Gena	Sonette	David										
Sonette			Killarney	Zan			Gena	Sivu											
Gena	Ashleigh	Marsha			Shona	Philip	Marian												
Philip	Ashleigh	Marsha			Shona	Moyra													
Shona	Ashleigh	Marsha			David														
Zan			Killarney	Solly															
Killarney			Zan																
Marsha	Shona	Philip																	
Ashleigh	Shona																		
Champion	Salvation Cup decision																		
Corné												Solly				Sivu			
Mark										Buhle			Moyra		Zavion		Buhle		

Jury vote
Episode	18		
Day	27		
Finalist	Graham	Buhle	Sivu
Votes	5–3–2		
Juror	Vote		
David	Graham		
Zavion			Sivu
Altaaf	Graham		
Shane			Sivu
Vel		Buhle	
Moyra	Graham		
Solly		Buhle	
Marian	Graham		
Corné	Graham		
Mark		Buhle	
