= Aspen Hills, Gauteng =

Aspen Hills
- Location within Gauteng Location within South Africa
- Coordinates: 26.310°S 28.047°E
- Country: South Africa
- Province: Gauteng
- Municipality: City of Johannesburg
- Time zone: UTC+2 (SAST)

Aspen Hills, Gauteng is a gated suburb of Johannesburg, South Africa. It is located in Region F (former Region 9), south east of the city centre.

Aspen Hills is quite vast and is divided into "villages". Among these are Aspen Hills and Aspen Lakes. The area is considered by some as a nature estate due to the strong preference and favour nature enjoys in this area.
