= Region 11 =

Region 11 or Region XI may refer to:

== Government ==
- Former Region 11 (Johannesburg), an administrative district in the city of Johannesburg, South Africa, from 2000 to 2006
- Davao Region (designated as Region XI), an administrative region in the Philippines
