= Region 3 =

Region 3 or Region III may refer to:

== Government ==
- Region 3, Northwest Territories, a Statistics Canada census division
- Former Region 3 (Johannesburg), an administrative district in the city of Johannesburg, South Africa, from 2000 to 2006
- Central Luzon (designated as Region II), an administrative region in the Philippines
- One of Regions of Iran, commonly known as Azerbaijan (Iran)

== Technology ==
- DVD region 3, one of the DVD regions
- ITU Region 3, consisting of the Americas
