= Former Region 1 (Johannesburg) =

Region 1 was an administrative district in the City of Johannesburg, South Africa, from 2000 to 2006. It is known as the Diepsloot region. It bordered Region 2 (Midrand), Region 3 (Sandton), and Region 5 (Roodepoort). The region was abolished with a reorganisation of regions in 2006.

Region 1 was over 82 km^{2} and is sparsely populated. It is mainly agricultural. The main population centre is Diepsloot with a population of 56,000 people. 76% of people live in informal housing in this region.
