= City and Suburban Industrial, Gauteng =

Suburb, Johannesburg

City and Suburban Industrial is a suburb of Johannesburg, South Africa. It is located in Region F of the City of Johannesburg Metropolitan Municipality.
