= Region 5 =

Region 5 or Region V may refer to:

== Government ==
- Region 5, Northwest Territories, a Statistics Canada census division
- Former Region 5 (Johannesburg), an administrative district in the city of Johannesburg, South Africa, from 2000 to 2006
- Bicol Region (designated as Region V), an administrative region in the Philippines
- One of Regions of Iran

== Technology ==
- DVD region 5, one of the DVD regions
