= Region 6 =

Region 6 or Region VI may refer to:

== Government ==
- East Berbice-Corentyne, Region 6 in Guyana
- Region 6, Northwest Territories, a Statistics Canada census division
- Former Region 6 (Johannesburg), an administrative district in the city of Johannesburg, South Africa, from 2000 to 2006
- Western Visayas (designated as Region VI), an administrative region in the Philippines

== Technology ==
- DVD region 6, one of the DVD regions

== Other uses ==
- Region 6 War Room, a nuclear bunker in Reading
