= North Doornfontein =

- Location within Gauteng Location within South Africa
- Coordinates: 26.208°S 28.062°E
- Country: South Africa
- Province: Gauteng
- Municipality: City of Johannesburg
- Main Place: Johannesburg

Area
  - Total: 0.04 km^{2} (0.015 sq mi)

Population (2011)
  - Total: 22
  - Density: 550/km^{2} (1,400/sq mi)

Racial makeup (2011)
  - Black African: 100.0%

First languages (2011)
  - Zulu: 81.8%
  - English: 9.1%
  - Xhosa: 9.1%
- Time zone: UTC+2 (SAST)

North Doornfontein (/ˈdʊərnfɒnteɪn/ DOORN-fon-tayn) is a suburb of Johannesburg, South Africa. It is located in Region F of the City of Johannesburg Metropolitan Municipality.
