= Region 9 =

Region 9 or Region IX may refer to:

== Government ==
- Former Region 9 (Johannesburg), an administrative district in the city of Johannesburg, South Africa, from 2000 to 2006
- Zamboanga Peninsula (designated as Region IX), an administrative region in the Philippines
