= Denver, Johannesburg =

Denver
- Denver's location in Gauteng
- Coordinates: 26°12′25″S 28°06′05″E
- Country: South Africa
- Province: Gauteng
- City: Johannesburg

Area
  - Total: 1.81 km^{2} (0.70 sq mi)

Population (2011)
  - Total: 7,257
  - Density: 4,009/km^{2} (10,380/sq mi)

Races
  - White: 0.3%
  - Asian: 0.3%
  - Cape Coloured: 0.3%
  - Black: 97.9%
  - Other: 1.2%

Languages
  - Zulu: 80.0%
  - Southern Ndebele: 3.4%
  - Xhosa: 2.5%
  - English: 2.3%
  - Other: 12.0%

Denver is an industrial suburb in eastern Johannesburg, South Africa, on the railway to Germiston and Hoofrif Road, around 6 km east of City Hall. It borders Benrose to the west, Jeppestown and Malvern to the north, Cleveland to the east, and the François Oberholzer Freeway to the south. There is just a small portion of the suburb in the northwest that has residential zoning; otherwise, Denver consists of industrial land and squatter camps both in the west and up north, the latter largely on Hoofrif Road.

== History ==
Denver was laid out on 25 ha of Doornfontein farm, like all the eastern suburbs of Johannesburg. Owner F.J. Bezuidenhout, for whom Bezuidenhout Valley is named, leased the area in 1903 to a J.H. Strutton to grow crops and garden. Denver was later purchased by a business, and in October 1898, it was zoned as a residential township. Before and after the Second Boer War, several American mining machinery firms built offices there, and it was named after Denver, capital of Colorado, as a result.

On 31 May 1900, Dr. Fritz Krause, the South African Republic's appointed mayor of Johannesburg, rode out to meet Frederick Roberts, 1st Earl Roberts to arrange the surrender of the main city into which they subsequently rode.

In the early years, the white population of the area was so large that from 1910 to 1933, there was a constituency in the Parliament of South Africa which located in the neighborhood.

== Railway station ==
The Denver Station stop on the Metrorail Gauteng is located at 26°12′22″S 28°5′48″E. It was the site of a train crash in 2015.

== Sources ==
- Potgieter, Dirk J., ed. (1971). "Denver, Johannesburg". Standard Encyclopaedia of Southern Africa. Vol. 3. Cape Town: Nasou. OCLC 633883698.
