= Region 2 =

Region 2 or Region II may refer to:

== Government ==
- Region 2, Northwest Territories, a Statistics Canada census division
- Former Region 2 (Johannesburg), an administrative district in Johannesburg, South Africa, from 2000 to 2006
- Cagayan Valley (designated as Region II), an administrative region in the Philippines
- One of the regions of Iran

== Technology ==
- DVD region 2, one of the DVD regions
- ITU Region 2, consisting of the Americas
