= Region 10 =

Region 10 or Region X may refer to:

== Government ==
- Former Region 10 (Johannesburg), an administrative district in the city of Johannesburg, South Africa, from 2000 to 2006
- Northern Mindanao Region (designated as Region X), an administrative region in the Philippines
