= Region 8 =

Region 8 or Region VIII may refer to:

== Government ==
- Former Region 8 (Johannesburg), an administrative district in the city of Johannesburg, South Africa, from 2000 to 2006
- Eastern Visayas (designated as Region VIII), an administrative region in the Philippines

== Technology ==
- DVD region 8, one of the DVD regions

== Other uses ==
- KAIT, a television station located in Jonesboro, Arkansas branded as Region 8
- NJCAA Region 8, a National Junior College Athletic Association region
