= Region 7 =

Region 7 or Region VII may refer to:

== Government ==
- Former Region 7 (Johannesburg), an administrative district in the city of Johannesburg, South Africa, from 2000 to 2006
- Central Visayas (designated as Region VII), an administrative region in the Philippines
- Northwestern Regional School District No. 7, a school district headquartered in Winsted, Connecticut

== Technology ==
- DVD region 7, one of the DVD regions

== Other uses ==
- Region 7 National Canoe Base
