= Randview =

- Location within Gauteng Location within South Africa
- Coordinates: 26.186°S 28.070°E
- Country: South Africa
- Province: Gauteng
- Municipality: City of Johannesburg

Area
  - Total: 0.06 km^{2} (0.023 sq mi)

Population (2011)
  - Total: 162
  - Density: 2,700/km^{2} (7,000/sq mi)

Racial makeup (2011)
  - Black African: 67.9%
  - Coloured: 0.6%
  - White: 31.5%

First languages (2011)
  - English: 38.3%
  - Zulu: 27.8%
  - Xhosa: 11.1%
  - Sotho: 6.8%
  - Other: 16.0%
- Time zone: UTC+2 (SAST)

Randview is a suburb of Johannesburg, South Africa. It is located in Region F of the City of Johannesburg Metropolitan Municipality.
