= Region 4 =

Region 4 or Region IV may refer to:

== Government ==
- Region 4, Northwest Territories, a Statistics Canada census division
- Coquimbo Region, an administrative region of Chile which was historically named Region IV
- Southern Tagalog (designated as Region IV), an administrative region in the Philippines
- Calabarzon (designated as Region IV‑A), an administrative region in the Philippines
- Former Region 4 (Johannesburg), an administrative district in the city of Johannesburg, South Africa, from 2000 to 2006
- One of the Regions of Iran

== Technology ==
- DVD region 4, one of the DVD regions
