= Benrose =

- Location within Gauteng Location within South Africa
- Coordinates: 26°12′39″S 28°4′54″E
- Country: South Africa
- Province: Gauteng
- Municipality: City of Johannesburg
- Main Place: Johannesburg
- Established: 1952

Area
  - Total: 0.74 km^{2} (0.29 sq mi)

Population (2011)
  - Total: 23
  - Density: 31/km^{2} (80/sq mi)

Racial makeup (2011)
  - Black African: 21.74%
  - Indian/Asian: 13.04%
  - White: 65.22%

First languages (2011)
  - English: 73.91%
  - Afrikaans: 17.39%
  - Tswana: 8.7%
- Time zone: UTC+2 (SAST)
- Postal code (street): 2094
- PO box: 2011

Benrose is a suburb of Johannesburg, South Africa. Slightly south of the Johannesburg CBD, it is next door to Jeppestown and Belgravia. It is light industry and commercial suburb. It is located in Region F of the City of Johannesburg Metropolitan Municipality.

== History ==
The suburb is situated on part of an old Witwatersrand farm called Doornfontein. The region of Benrose was named by the property developer Robert Horowitz, whose mother's name was Rose and who had been murdered during The Holocaust. It means "son of Rose" in Hebrew. The suburb was proclaimed in June 1952.
