= Belgravia, Gauteng =

Johannesburg Region F suburb

Belgravia
- Suburb
- Location within Gauteng Location within South Africa
- Coordinates: 26°12′16.525″S 28°5′11.902″E
- Country: South Africa
- Province: Gauteng
- Municipality: City of Johannesburg
- Main Place: Johannesburg
- Time zone: UTC+2 (SAST)
- Postal code (street): 2094
- PO box: 2043

Belgravia is a suburb of Johannesburg, South Africa. It is located in Region F of the City of Johannesburg Metropolitan Municipality.

== History ==
Prior to the discovery of gold on the Witwatersrand in 1886, the suburb lay on land on one of the original farms that make up Johannesburg, called Doornfontein. The land was purchased by Jeppe & Company and was laid out by J.B. Tucker in September 1889. The land company's objective was for an exclusive suburb with Sir Julius Jeppe, building his mansion called Friedenheim. It was formerly the eastern part of Jeppestown.
