= Former Region 4 (Johannesburg) =

Region 4 was an administrative region of the City of Johannesburg, South Africa, from 2000 to 2006, situated almost exactly in the middle of the City of Johannesburg Metropolitan Municipality. It contained the north-western suburbs of Johannesburg as well as western Randburg to the north and Florida to the south-west. Its central and south-eastern area stretches from Bosmont to Pageview, and south of that is the undeveloped belt of land that stretches along Main Reef Road. Starting in the north and proceeding clockwise, it bordered Regions 3, 8, 9, 10, 6, and 5. The region was abolished with a reorganisation of regions in 2006.
