= Former Region 5 (Johannesburg) =

Region 5 was an administrative district in the City of Johannesburg, from 2000 to 2006, covering the greater Roodepoort, Randburg, Olivedale and Northriding areas on the western flank of the City of Johannesburg. Its long western boundary forms most of the unicity's western boundary. To the north (Region 1) and east (Regions 2, 3, and 4) it shared boundaries with largely prosperous residential areas. To the south, it met the northern boundary of Region 6, Doornkop/Soweto. The region was abolished with a reorganisation of regions in 2006.
