= Johannesburg train crash =

Train crash in South Africa

Denver train crash

Details
- Date: 28 April 2015; 07:10
- Location: Denver station, Johannesburg
- Coordinates: 26°12′21″S 28°05′49″E
- Country: South Africa
- Line: Johannesburg - Pretoria
- Operator: Metrorail Gauteng
- Incident type: Rear-end collision
- Cause: SPAD, Overspeeding

Statistics
- Trains: 2
- Passengers: 900
- Deaths: 1
- Injured: ~240
- Damage: R17.5 million

The Denver train crash occurred on 28 April 2015 when a passenger train ran into the rear of another at Denver station, Johannesburg, South Africa. One person was killed and about 240 were injured. Damage was R 17.5 million ($1.4M, €1.3M, or £960k as of May 2015).

== Crash ==
At 07:10 local time (05:10 UTC), a passenger train ran into the rear of another at Denver station. One person was killed and around 240 were injured, two seriously. The trains were a Metro Plus train with 700 people on board, and a Business Express train with 200 people on board. The Business Express train was travelling from Pretoria to Park Station, Johannesburg, as was the Metro Plus train. The Metro Plus train was stationary at the station. The person killed was a security guard on the Metro Plus train. The driver of the Business Express train was airlifted to hospital.

The two trains involved were Metroplus Express Train 0600 and Business Express Train 1602, both of which are operated by PRASA Rail. PRASA operates commuter rail services as Metrorail. Metrorail operates in the Gauteng province of the country as a separate region, known as Metrorail Gauteng. Within Metrorail Gauteng, the accident happened on the line serving Pretoria, Kempton Park, Germiston and Johannesburg. Business Express is the luxury commuter service brand of Metrorail.

== Investigation ==
The Railway Safety Regulator investigated the accident. They were expected to release a statement on 29 April.

The RSR released a final report on the incident in March 2016.

The driver of the leading train, the Metroplus Express 0600 had stopped at a signal at Denver station at 7:06 because the driver could not read the signal due to the bright sunlight. He tried to contact the Centralised Traffic Control Office at George Goch via radio, but the communications systems were out of service at the centre due to a power failure.

Meanwhile, the following train was travelling over the speed limit at about 91 km/h (57 mph) in a 70 km/h (43 mph) zone. It failed to slow at a yellow caution signal nor stop at the red danger signal. The driver applied the brakes 332 m (1,089 ft) from the stopped train, but the train only slowed to 61 km/h (38 mph) at the point of impact. At 91 km/h, the train would have required 510 m (1,670 ft) to stop.

The report also notes that the power failure disabled radios, phones, and voice recording systems at the CTC office. There was no backup power supply.

The CTC did have one cellular phone as a backup, but the driver of the Metro Express train was not given the number. Also, the CTC office did not have contact details for the Metro Express driver.

The RSR had a contact at the PRASA called the Nominated Manager, however this arrangement was unsatisfactory because PRASA officials were late or unresponsive in providing requested materials during the investigation. They also failed to appear at scheduled hearings. Apparently the investigators were only able to get answers after applying pressure to upper management of PRASA. The investigators were also never able to interview the driver of Business Express Train 1602 since she was still in the hospital during the investigation.
