= Former Region 8 (Johannesburg) =

Region 8 was an administrative district from 2000 to 2006 in the City of Johannesburg, South Africa, located in the historic heart of Johannesburg centrally situated on the north-west axis, and towards the eastern border. Surrounding regions, from the north and proceeding clockwise, were Region 3 (Sandton), Region 7 (Alexandra), Region 9 (Johannesburg South), and Region 4 (Northcliff). The southern boundary is the M2 east-west freeway. This region included the Central Business District of the city. The region was abolished with a reorganisation of regions in 2006.

This region has now been merged with the former region 9 to create the new region F.
