= Former Region 3 (Johannesburg) =

Region 3 was an administrative district in the City of Johannesburg, South Africa, from 2000 to 2006, and was also known as the Sandton region, as it included the formerly independent municipality of Sandton, and many of the northern suburbs of the former Johannesburg municipality. It bordered Region 1 (Diepsloot), Region 2 (Midrand), Region 7 (Alexandra), Region 8 (Johannesburg Central), Region 4 (Northcliff), and Region 5 (Roodepoort). The region was abolished with a reorganisation of regions in 2006.

The area is fairly heavily populated with the large urban centre of Sandton located in the region, however there are also many parks with large biodiversity. This area is close to Johannesburg's central business district. It is infamous for its heavy traffic, however in preparation for the World Summit on Sustainable Development the government spent considerable sums of money investing in upgrades to the transportation network.

This economic activity in this area centres on business, and there is a lot of housing in this area.

== Demographics ==
According to the South African National Census of 2001, the population of Region 3 was 178,549 people. Whites accounting for 62.50% of the population, followed by Blacks at 32.35%, Asians and Coloureds at 5.15%. 15.6% of the population was under the age of 15, whilst 8.4% were over the age of 65. The median age in the city was 35 years old, and for every 100 females, there were 85.7 males. 4.6% of the labour force were unemployed.

63.1% of the region's residents spoke English at home, 7.4% spoke Zulu, 6.2% spoke Afrikaans, 14.7% spoke other official languages, and 2.8% of the population spoke a non-official language at home.

3.3% of residents aged 20 and over received no schooling; 6.2% had some primary school; 3.0% completed only primary school; 18.9% had some high school education; 26.8% finished only high school and 41.7% had an education higher than the high school level. Overall, 68.5% of residents had completed high school. The median annual income of working adults aged 15–65 was ZAR 59 109.
