= Carol Tshabalala =

South African sports broadcaster

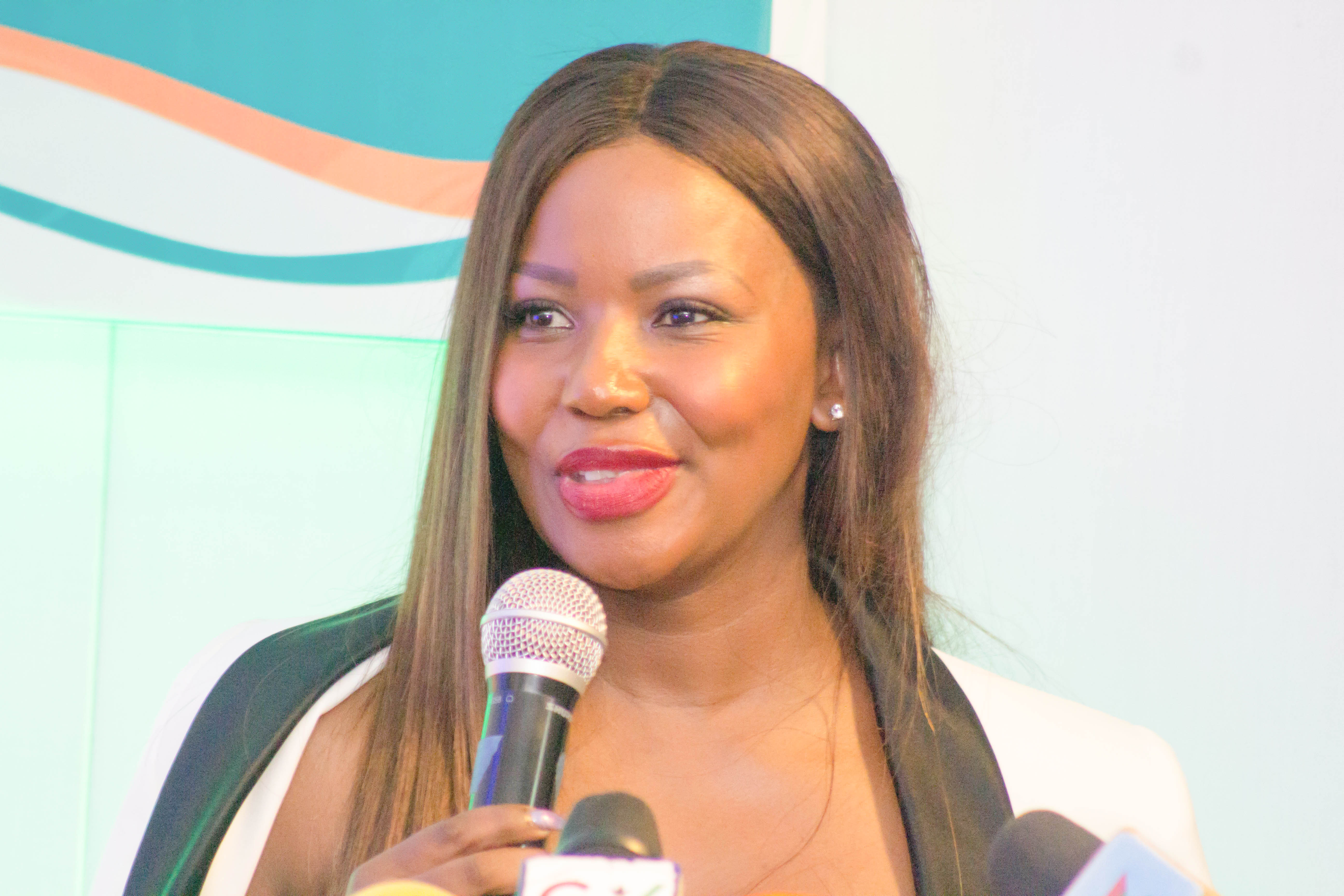
- Born: 11 August 1981 (age 44); Pimville, Soweto, South Africa
- Education: Krugersdorp High School
- Occupation: Sports presenter
- Employer(s): SuperSport; Premier League Productions
- Television: Extra Time; Carol's Odyssey; Football Today

Carol Tshabalala (born 11 August 1981) is a South African sports broadcaster, producer, freelance reporter and voice-over artist currently working for SuperSport International and Premier League Productions. She is often referred to as South Africa's "First Lady of Sport," covering football, boxing and basketball. She was the first African to host the FIFA Ballon d’Or in Zurich in 2011.

== Career ==
Tshabalala started her career as an apprentice on the show Sports Buzz on SABC at the age of 18. She would work for the SABC as a sports broadcaster from 2000 to 2011. She joined SuperSport International in 2011, and in 2016, joined UK’s Premier League Productions (IMG productions) as a live studio anchor. She is the current host of the show Extra Time on SuperSport.

Tshabalala's career in radio started at Kaya FM 95.9 as a sports news journalist from 2005 to 2007. She joined Radio 2000 in 2008 as a drive-time sports show presenter and was there until 2013.

In February 2022, Tshabalala was named as a brand ambassador for sports betting operator Hollywoodbets.

== Awards ==
- King of the ring announcer on woman's day 2025

== Personal life ==
In February 2022, she announced her engagement on Instagram, although the identity of her fiancé has been kept private.
