= Jimmy Tau =

South African soccer player

Personal information
- Full name: Jimmy Raboholo Tau
- Date of birth: 23 July 1980 (age 46)
- Place of birth: Kimberley, South Africa
- Height: 1.76 m (5 ft 9 1/2 in)
- Position: Right-back

Senior career*
Years	Team	Apps	(Gls)
1999–2001	Basotho Tigers	34	(6)
2001–2002	Maritzburg City	28	(3)
2002–2005	Orlando Pirates	73	(4)
2005–2013	Kaizer Chiefs	165	(5)
Total		300	(18)

International career^{‡}
2003–2007	South Africa	8	(0)
- * Club domestic league appearances and goals as of 13 July 2012 ‡ National team caps and goals as of 13 July 2012

Jimmy Tau (born 23 July 1980 in Kimberley, Northern Cape) is a South African former soccer player who played as a right-back. He played for Kaizer Chiefs and Orlando Pirates and in the South African Premier Division and for Basotho Tigers and Maritzburg City in the National First Division. He also played internationally for South Africa and was a participant at the 2006 African Nations Cup in Egypt.

== Club career ==
=== Basotho Tigers ===
Jimmy Tau started out at Basotho Tigers in the 1999/00 Vodacom League season in the semi-pro ranks. The club was promoted to the National First Division and finished 11th in its debut season.

=== Maritzburg City ===
In the 2001/02 he moved to Maritzburg City where he would play alongside his future teammate Mabhuti Khenyeza. Tau played 28 games and helped the team finish 3rd on the log

=== Orlando Pirates ===
Tau signed for Orlando Pirates ahead of the 2002/ 2003 campaign, going on to win the league with the Buccaneers that season.

=== Kaizer Chiefs ===
Tau joined Chiefs in 2005. His debut for Chiefs was in the SAA Supa 8 quarter-final on 20 August 2005 in a 2–1 loss to Bloemfontein Celtic. His first goal for Chiefs came in a league match against Silver Stars on 23 April 2006 winning 2–1. Tau went on the captain Chiefs in an eight-year stay that coincided with the club winning two Nedbank Cup trophies, two MTN8 cups, three Telkom Knockout winners' medals, and the 2012/ 2013 Absa Premiership trophy. By the end of his spell Tau had played 210 matches for Chiefs.

== International career ==
Tau made his international debut on 8 October 2003 in a 3–0 win over Lesotho in Maseru. He was a participant in the 2006 AFCON. He played his last international match on 28 March 2007 against Bolivia in a 1–0 loss coming in as a substitute for Cyril Nzama.

== Style of play ==
Tau played as a marauding right back. PSL.co.za described Tau as an incisive tackler and had outstanding timing in his challenges.

== Retirement ==
Tau announced his retirement from professional football on his 33rd birthday at the Conference Centre, Soweto Hotel in Gauteng on 23 July 2013. He also cited his injury being one of the reasons for his retirement.

=== Outside football ===
In December 2012, Tau became the director of Bataung Memorial Tombstones, a tombstone manufacturing company based in Katlehong. Tau was one of three former sportsmen featured on Survivor South Africa filmed in October 2013 on an island off Malaysia in the South China Sea including former Lazio defender Mark Fish and former Springbok captain Corné Krige. Tau described the island as "a beautiful island, that is extremely hot and very humid". Tau released his autobiography on 25 December 2013 called "Jimmy Tau - My Life Story".
