= Former Region 6 (Johannesburg) =

South African district

Region 6 was an administrative district in the City of Johannesburg, from 2000 to 2006, South Africa. It was situated towards the south west of the City of Johannesburg Metropolitan Municipality. It abutted the city's Mining Belt in the north or the southern boundary of Region 5 (Roodepoort) and from there stretched south to meet Region 11 (Ennerdale and Orange Farm). Its western boundary, which projected further west than any other region, formed the periphery of its area of Johannesburg. On the east, Region 6 shared its boundary with the other Soweto region, Region 10. The region was abolished with a reorganisation of regions in 2006.
