= Former Region 7 (Johannesburg) =

Region 7 was an administrative district in the City of Johannesburg, South Africa, from 2000 to 2006. It included the densely populated Alexandra township and the town of Modderfontein and was one of Johannesburg's eastern boundary sections, situated in the north-east of the city. Regions 2 (Midrand), 3 (Sandton), and 8 (Central) were to its west, with Midrand also forming its northern boundary. It touched on Region 9 (Johannesburg South) in the south. Its position gives it good access to the City's eastern neighbours, such as Kempton Park and Germiston. The region was abolished with a reorganisation of regions in 2006.
