= Jeppestown =

- Suburb
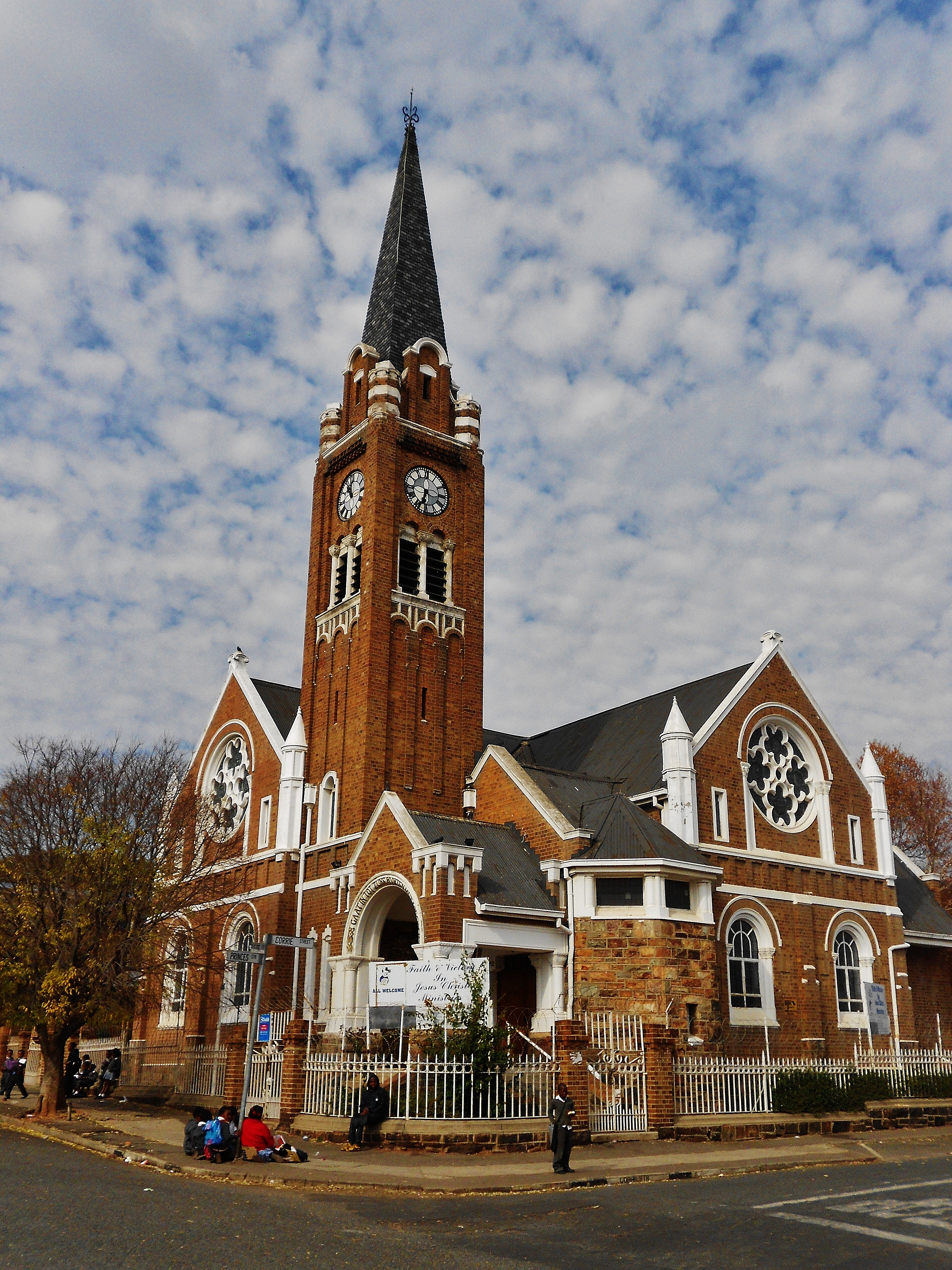
- Dutch Reformed Church in Jeppestown

- Location within Gauteng Location within South Africa
- Coordinates: 26°12′15″S 28°4′22″E
- Country: South Africa
- Province: Gauteng
- Municipality: City of Johannesburg
- Main Place: Johannesburg

Area
  - Total: 1.83 km^{2} (0.71 sq mi)

Population (2011)
  - Total: 14,795
  - Density: 8,080/km^{2} (20,900/sq mi)

Racial makeup (2011)
  - Black African: 89.3%
  - Coloured: 3.6%
  - Indian/Asian: 2.0%
  - White: 4.1%
  - Other: 1.0%

First languages (2011)
  - Zulu: 55.8%
  - English: 13.2%
  - Xhosa: 5.0%
  - Afrikaans: 3.4%
  - Other: 22.6%
- Time zone: UTC+2 (SAST)
- Postal code (street): 2094
- PO box: 2043

Jeppestown is a suburb of Johannesburg, South Africa. It is located in Region F of the City of Johannesburg Metropolitan Municipality.

== History ==
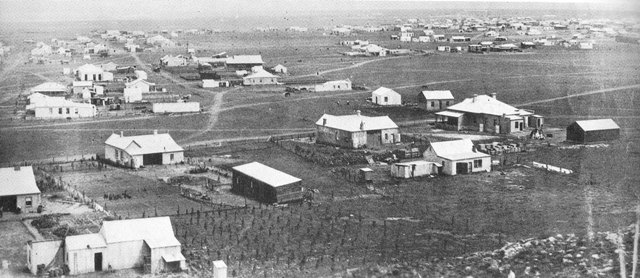
Jeppestown, 1888

Jeppestown was established in or after 1886 by C.E.G. Julius Jeppe, who formed the Ford and Jeppe Estate Company with his son, who was also called Julius Jeppe, and L.P. Ford. In 1893, the Masonic temple was completed. In 1894, Jeppestown was described as consisting of "421 buildings, two churches, a Masonic temple, St Mary's Collegiate for Girls and a library". In 1896, the suburb had 5,647 inhabitants. St Michael's School for Boys, which has since been renamed Jeppe High School for Boys, was established in 1890, and the piece of open land called Julius Jeppe Oval was converted to a park in approximately the same year. The eastern part of Jeppestown came to be known as Belgravia.

The "Jeppestown Tragedy" was a shootout that took place between police and armed robbers on 25 June 2006. Four policemen and eight robbers were killed before the remaining 15 gang members surrendered.
