= Former Region 2 (Johannesburg) =

Region 2 was an administrative district in the City of Johannesburg, South Africa, from 2000 to 2006. It is known as the Midrand region. It bordered Region 3 (Sandton), Region 7 (Modderfontein), and Region 1 (Diepsloot). The region was abolished with a reorganisation of regions in 2006.

The development of Region 2 has traditionally centred on the N1, the main highway that links Johannesburg to Pretoria to the north. Housing in Region 2 is mostly formal with many affluent suburbs. Midrand has not had much significant development, so a lot of open space remains. Region 2 currently has a population of 200,000. While many people in Region 2 are wealthy, the vast majority of residents are poor: 36% earn no reported income at all.
