= Former Region 11 (Johannesburg) =

Region 11 was an administrative district in the City of Johannesburg, South Africa, from 2000 to 2006. On a map, Region 11 appeared to hang down from the borders of the two Soweto regions and Johannesburg South. It was about 40 km south of the Inner City. It was the most isolated, least integrated region of Johannesburg, with its east, west and southern borders also forming Johannesburg's boundaries in the area. It was diagonally traversed by the N1 and the Golden Highway (both from north-east to south-west), with the N12 running along its northern border. The region was abolished with a reorganisation of regions in 2006.
