= Former Region 10 (Johannesburg) =

Region 10 was an administrative district from 2000 to 2006 in the City of Johannesburg, South Africa. It included most of Soweto. Soweto is a composite name, standing for South-Western Townships. So even this eastern region of it lay not to the south of central Johannesburg, but south of Florida. Its northern boundary was shared with Region 4 (Florida).

The region was abolished with a reorganisation of regions in 2006.
