= Diepsloot =

Diepsloot Sloot
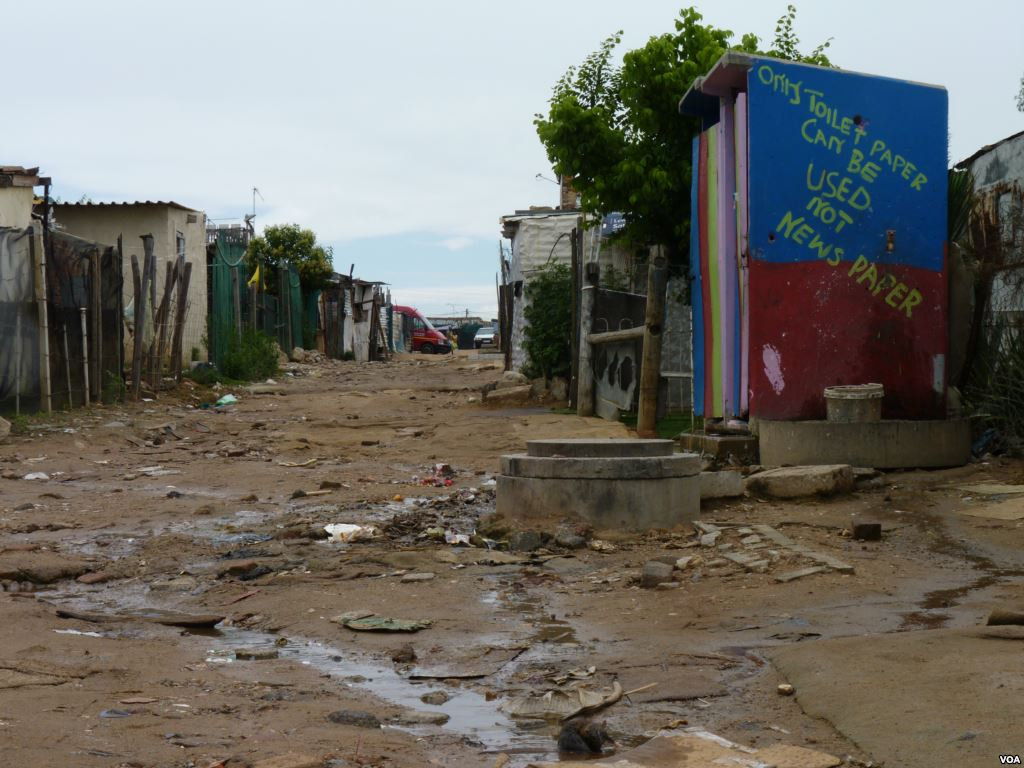
- A part of Diepsloot in 2012.

- Location within Gauteng Location within South Africa
- Coordinates: 25.934722°S 28.0125°E
- Country: South Africa
- Province: Gauteng
- Municipality: City of Johannesburg
- Established: 1995

Government
  - Type: Ward 95 and 113

Area
  - Total: 12.00 km^{2} (4.63 sq mi)

Population (2011)
  - Total: 138,329
  - Density: 11,530/km^{2} (29,860/sq mi)

Racial makeup (2011)
  - Black African: 98.2%
  - Coloured: 0.0%
  - Indian/Asian: 0.1%
  - White: 0.2%
  - Other: 1.5%

First languages (2011)
  - Northern Sotho: 22.8%
  - Zulu: 19.9%
  - Tsonga: 10.5%
  - S. Ndebele: 10.5%
  - Other: 36.3%
- Time zone: UTC+2 (SAST)
- Postal code (street): 2189
- PO box: 2069

Diepsloot (/ˈdiːpslʊərt/ DEEP-sloort), Afrikaans for "deep ditch", is a densely populated township in Gauteng, South Africa. It is located in the Region A of the City of Johannesburg Metropolitan Municipality. There are high levels of crimes here including illegal electricity connections and theft.

== Geography ==
Diepsloot is a northern periphery of the City of Johannesburg Metropolitan Municipality and is divided into extensions. Diepsloot is made up of fully government-subsidised housing (RDP) (Extensions 4, 5, 6, 9, and 10), brick houses built by landowners (Extensions 2 and 7), partially government- subsidised houses (Extension 3/Tanganani) as well as shacks (the biggest sections being Extensions 1, 12, and 13). A large proportion (45.5%) of residents rent their property from a landowner who has subdivided their land.

== History ==
Diepsloot was established in 1995 as a transit camp for some of the people who had been removed from Zevenfontein (informally known as eSgodiphola), a squatter camp right next to Chartwell that had been there since the late 80's. The people who remained behind in Zevenfontein had chosen to be moved to a different place, Cosmo City, which only started happening 10 years later at the end of 2005. Initially 1,124 plots were made available in Extension 2.

People were to stay in the transit camp until land elsewhere became available. For many, this camp became a permanent home. The Transvaal Provincial Administration, which was then the local authority, developed the plots into formal housing stands. In 1999, the former Northern Municipality Local Council began to initiate formal development in the area. There were about 4,000 families living in backyard shacks and 6,035 families in the reception area, a transit zone established by the city council.

Compounding the congestion, in 2001 the Gauteng government moved about 5,000 families to Diepsloot from the banks of the Jukskei River in Alexandra. The move, part of the Alexandra Renewal Project, was intended "to de-congest and address the need to create a healthy and clean living environment" in Alexandra, one of South Africa's oldest townships.

An aim was also to prevent shacks being washed away when the river flooded, something that happened year after year. The influx of people from Alexandra placed further strain on the already stretched resources of Diepsloot. The relocated families did not qualify for housing benefits.

=== Modern day ===
So far, 4,900 Reconstruction and Development Programme (RDP) houses have been constructed in Diepsloot. Another 737 housing stands with water and sanitation facilities have been allocated. The national housing policy has moved away from the mass provision of standard RDP houses: it now follows the People's Housing Process model, a project being implemented in Diepsloot West. RDP houses are still being constructed, but the new process has the state provide a subsidy that covers the cost of building a house. The prospective home owner is expected to pay a portion of the costs.

Diepsloot is now home to about 140,000 people. Many of them live in 3×2 metre shacks, assembled from scrap metal, wood, plastic and cardboard. Some families lack access to running water, sewerage and rubbish removal. All extensions except for extensions 1, 5, 12 and 13 have tar roads, drainage and street lights. Members of the local council live in all extensions, except extension 5.

Extensions 1 and 5 often get flooded in the heavy summer rains as the water from the mall runs down into their roads. Residents use paraffin and electric stoves for cooking. In the 2011 census, 18.4% of dwellers have piped water inside their dwelling, 61.2% have electricity and 74.1% have access to a flush toilet connected to the sewage system. The majority of shacks which have access to electricity use a prepaid meter, but this is becoming increasingly expensive and is used sparingly.

== Popular culture ==
Diepsloot was featured on the BBC program Law and Disorder in Johannesburg. Karl Pilkington visited Diepsloot and talked to a group of students as a part of Season Two of An Idiot Abroad in 2011.

The television series DiepCity which was playing in Mzansi Magic was based on life in Diepsloot.

== Social deprivation ==
Diepsloot is generally described as a notorious settlement full of crime, violent protests and unpredictability. This place is inhabited by people from different tribes, cultures, traditions and nationalities, many of whom have no educational background or a skill set which they can use to find employment. The lack of education or skill set may be due to material deprivation, lack of security and the absence or dysfunctional needs such as water and sanitation infrastructure development.

The above-mentioned factors have a detrimental effect on employment opportunities towards Diepsloot dwellers as employers cannot hire people without a basic education or skill set and come from a community that is generally described as violent and full of crime.
