= Former Region 9 (Johannesburg) =

Region 9 was an administrative district from 2000 to 2006 in the City of Johannesburg, South Africa, situated in the south-eastern corner of Johannesburg. To the north it met the Inner City along the Mining Belt and the M2. To the east and south, it formed the boundary of Johannesburg. Its neighbours to the west were Region 10 (the Diepkloof/Meadowlands region of Soweto) and Region 11 (Ennerdale/Orange Farm). Its south-eastern position means that it shared boundaries with the neighbouring municipal areas of Germiston and Alberton. The region was abolished with a reorganisation of regions in 2006.
