= Survivor South Africa: Philippines =

- Season 6
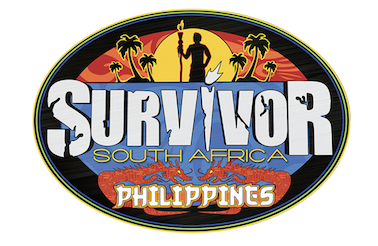
- Presented by: Nico Panagio
- No. of days: 39
- No. of castaways: 18
- Winner: Tom Swartz
- Runner-up: Jeanne Michel
- Location: El Nido, Palawan, Philippines
- No. of episodes: 16

Release
- Original network: M-Net
- Original release: 3 May – 16 August 2018

Additional information
- Filming dates: 15 January – 22 February 2018

Season chronology
- ← Previous; Champions Next → Island of Secrets

Survivor South Africa: Philippines is the sixth season of the South African reality competition show Survivor South Africa. The season was filmed in January and February 2018 in the Palawan province of the Philippines and aired weekly on M-Net from May 3, 2018, until the live finale on August 16, 2018, when Tom Swartz was crowned Sole Survivor over Jeanne Michel in a vote of 6–1. It was the fourth season hosted by Nico Panagio and was produced by Afrokaans Film & Television.

This season incorporated several format changes and twists from international editions. This was the first Survivor South Africa season to last 39 days — the typical length of the American series — instead of the 27 or 29-day format used in earlier seasons. This season also featured a tribe swap during which a third tribe was introduced alongside the original two starting tribes (as first seen in Survivor: Cambodia), a Tribal Council vote to swap members on two tribes (as seen in the 2016 season of Australian Survivor) and a vote to remove a jury member (as first seen in Survivor: Kaôh Rōng). This season also provided the first instance on the South African franchise of rock draw tie-breaker at Tribal Council. While the rule change to the tie-break rules was alluded to on Survivor South Africa: Champions, this is the first instance that a tie was broken by rock draw instead of vote count-backs or tiebreaker challenges.

== Contestants ==
The cast is composed of 18 players, initially split into two tribes containing nine members each; Luzon and Mindanao, named after the two largest islands of the Philippines. Adrian "Ace" Chetty won a wildcard competition to compete in the season.

On Day 9, the castaways were divided into three tribes with the creation of the Visayas tribe, named after the third largest region of islands in the Philippines. Day 16 saw two tribes voting one of their own at Tribal Council to swap tribes, bringing another tribemate along with them. Day 22 saw the three tribes merge into the Araw tribe, named after the Filipino word for "sun".

List of Survivor South Africa: Philippines contestants
Contestant	Original tribe	First switched tribe	Second switched tribe	Merged tribe	Finish
Seamus Holmes; 25, Durban, Kwa Zulu Natal	Luzon				1st voted out Day 3
Neil Voller; 55, Johannesburg, Gauteng	Luzon				Eliminated (Note: Due to a deadlocked tie after two rounds of voting and the non-tied contestants being unable to come up with a unanimous decision to vote out either Annalize or Josie, the non-tied contestants—Ace, Chané, Neil, Palesa, Tom and Vusi—drew rocks to resolve the vote; Neil picked the white rock and was therefore eliminated.); Day 6
Stacey-Lee Valentyn; 27, Cape Town, Western Cape	Mindanao				2nd voted out Day 8
Adrian "Ace" Chetty; 28, Johannesburg, Gauteng	Luzon	Luzon			3rd voted out Day 11
Murishca Martheze; 34, Cape Town, Western Cape	Mindanao	Visayas			4th voted out Day 13
Marthunis Oosthuizen; 29, Durban, Kwa Zulu Natal	Mindanao	Mindanao			Quit; Day 16
Tevin Naidu; 24, Durban, Kwa Zulu Natal	Mindanao	Mindanao	Mindanao		5th voted out Day 18
Josie Eveleigh; 28, Cape Town, Western Cape	Luzon	Luzon	Mindanao		6th voted out Day 21
Vusi Mafulela; 35, Johannesburg, Gauteng	Luzon	Visayas	Visayas	Araw	7th voted out 1st jury member Day 25
Chané Mynhardt; 28, Bloemfontein, Free State	Luzon	Visayas	Visayas	Araw	8th voted out 2nd jury member Day 27
Palesa Tau; 28, Johannesburg, Gauteng	Luzon	Visayas	Visayas	Araw	9th voted out 3rd jury member Day 29
Antoinette "Toni" Tebbutt; 38, Johannesburg, Gauteng	Mindanao	Luzon	Mindanao	Araw	10th voted out 4th jury member Day 30
Pheko "PK" Phetoe; 28, Pretoria, Gauteng	Mindanao	Mindanao	Mindanao	Araw	11th voted out 5th jury member Day 33
Katinka Oosthuizen; 19, Mossel Bay, Western Cape	Mindanao	Mindanao	Luzon	Araw	12th voted out 6th jury member Day 35
Werner Joubert; 34, Secunda, Mpumalanga	Mindanao	Luzon	Luzon	Araw	13th voted out ~~7th jury member~~ (Note: On Day 38, for winning the final immunity challenge, Jeanne also earned the power to eliminate one of the jurors. She chose Werner.); Day 37
Annalize Sainsbury; 44, Cape Town, Western Cape	Luzon	Mindanao	Luzon	Araw	14th voted out 8th jury member Day 38
Jeanne Michel; 34, Cape Town, Western Cape	Mindanao	Luzon	Luzon	Araw	Runner-up
Tom Swartz; 41, Port Elizabeth, Eastern Cape	Luzon	Visayas	Visayas	Araw	Sole Survivor

=== Future appearances ===
Antoinette 'Toni' Tebbutt, Palesa Tau, Pheko 'PK' Phetoe, Seamus Holmes and Tevin Naidu competed again in Survivor South Africa: Return of the Outcasts in 2022.

== Season summary ==
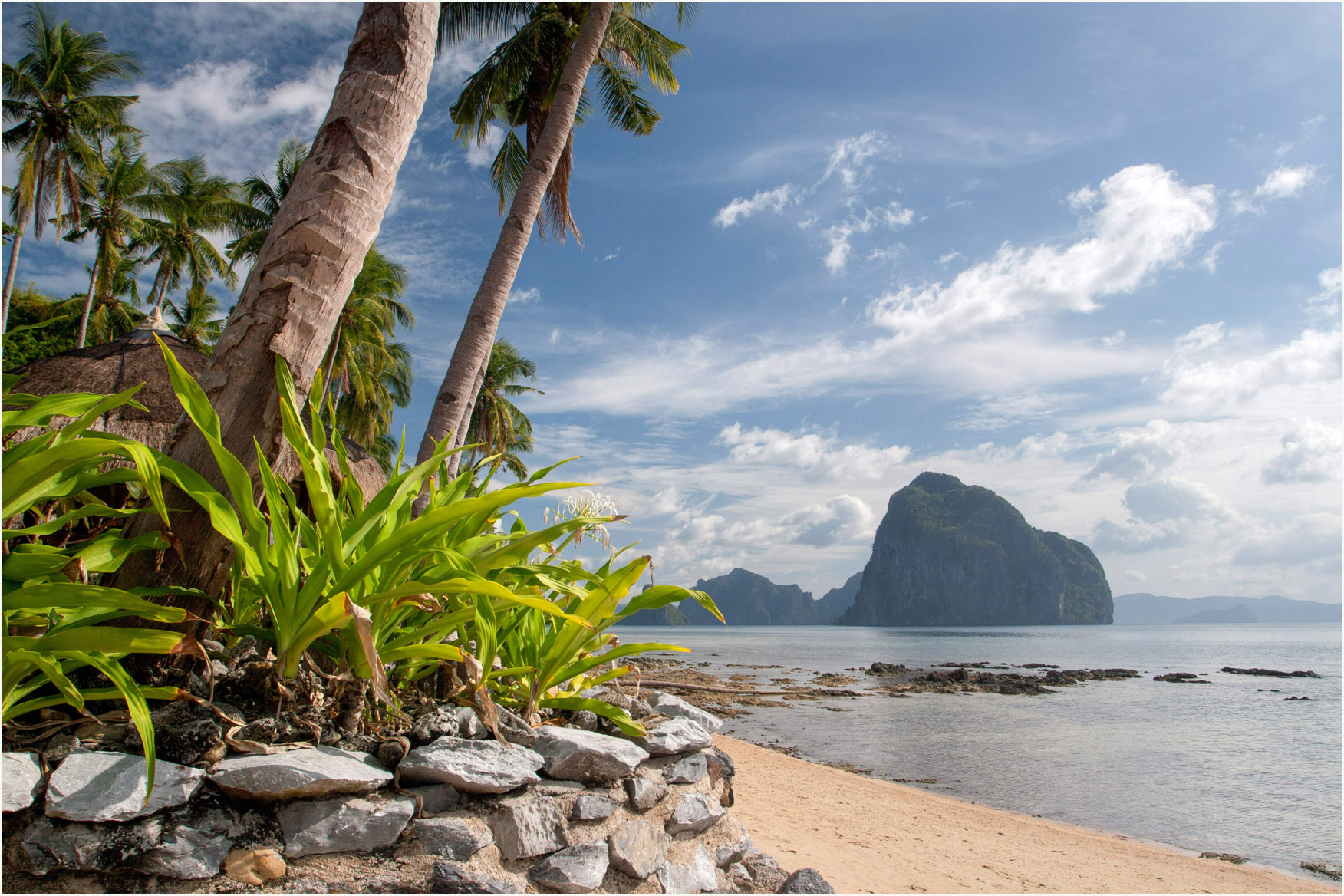
The season was filmed in El Nido, Palawan in the Philippines.

The new 18 castaways were divided into two tribes: Luzon and Mindanao. Initially Luzon were divided by alliances trying to win over Ace's loyalty, while Mindanao dominated in the early challenges. A tribe expansion saw Mindanao acquire majority over the original two tribes, while a third tribe called Visayas saw Tom, Chané, Palesa, and Vusi in an uneasy truce from their original Luzon days. Even with a surprise vote shuffle, the Mindanaos diverted from one another in preparation for the merge. Jeanne, Katinka, and Werner saw comfort with new tribal lines, while Toni and PK sought to protect Mindanao Strong by cutting potential strategic threats.

At the Merge, the Visayas tribe offered to the original Mindanao alliance an easy first vote of Tom. However, Werner used this opportunity to recruit Tom to eliminate the remaining Visayas members. With two idols in his possession, Werner became the leader of the majority alliance, using Annalize and Tom to systematically cut out the Visayas tribe and original Mindanao members, PK and Toni. As Werner accumulated power, the women in his alliance started to turn on him. When Katinka let slip to Tom of her and Annalize' plans, the men blindsided Katinka at the final five. At final four, however, after all advantages and idols had expired, Jeanne rallied Annalize and Tom to eliminate Werner as the biggest challenge and jury threat. After back to back surprise immunity challenge wins, Jeanne took Tom to the end to face the Final Tribal Council, and removed Werner from the jury itself. The jury was mostly able to set aside differences to respect Tom's scrambling underdog game more so than Jeanne's quietly hesitant strategic game, resulting in a victory for Tom by a vote of 6–1.

Challenge winners and eliminations by episode
Episode		Challenge winner(s)		Eliminated	Finish
No.	Original air date	Reward	Immunity	Eliminated	Finish
1	May 3, 2018	Mindanao	Mindanao	Seamus	1st voted out Day 3
2	May 10, 2018	Mindanao	Mindanao	Neil	Eliminated (Note: Due to a deadlocked tie after two rounds of voting to vote out either Annalize or Josie, the non-tied contestants—Ace, Chané, Neil, Palesa, Tom, and Vusi—drew rocks to resolve the vote; Neil picked the white rock and was therefore eliminated.); Day 6
3	May 17, 2018	Luzon	Luzon	Stacey-Lee	2nd voted out Day 8
4	May 24, 2018	Luzon	Mindanao	Ace	3rd voted out Day 11
4	May 24, 2018	Mindanao	Visayas	Ace	3rd voted out Day 11
5	May 31, 2018	Mindanao (Note: Combined Reward and Immunity challenge.)		Murishca	4th voted out Day 13
5	May 31, 2018	Luzon		Murishca	4th voted out Day 13
6	June 7, 2018	Visayas		Marthinus	Quit; Day 16
6	June 7, 2018	Visayas		No-one voted out on Day 16 due to a vote to exchange tribe members (Note: Instead of voting out players, the two losing tribes unknowingly voted to send a member to the other tribe, who in turn brought another tribemate with them. Luzon voted out Josie who brought Toni with her to Mindanao; Mindanao voted out Annalize who brought Katinka with her to Luzon.)	
7	June 14, 2018	Mindanao	Luzon	Tevin	5th voted out Day 18
7	June 14, 2018	Luzon	Visayas	Tevin	5th voted out Day 18
8	June 21, 2018	Visayas	Visayas	Josie	6th voted out Day 21
8	June 21, 2018	Luzon	Luzon	Josie	6th voted out Day 21
9	June 28, 2018	None	Toni	Vusi	7th voted out 1st jury member Day 25
10	July 5, 2018	Chané, Palesa, Toni, Werner [PK (Note: PK was not selected for the challenge, but received the food portion of the reward during the challenge.)]	Katinka	Chané	8th voted out 2nd jury member Day 27
11	July 12, 2018	Palesa, [Tom]	Werner	Palesa	9th voted out 3rd jury member Day 29
12	July 19, 2018	Tom, [Jeanne, Werner]	Tom	Toni	10th voted out 4th jury member Day 30
13	July 26, 2018	Survivor; Auction	Werner	PK	11th voted out 5th jury member Day 33
14	August 2, 2018	Werner, [Katinka, Tom]	Tom	Katinka	12th voted out 6th jury member Day 35
15	August 9, 2018	Tom [Jeanne]	Jeanne	Werner	13th voted out ~~7th jury member~~ (Note: On Day 38, for winning the final immunity challenge, Jeanne also earned the power to eliminate one of the jurors. She chose Werner.); Day 37
16	August 16, 2018	Jeanne (Note: The winner of the Final Immunity Challenge was also awarded the power to eliminate one of the jury members. Jeanne chose to eliminate Werner from the jury.)		Annalize	14th voted out 8th jury member Day 38
16	August 16, 2018			Jury vote	
16	August 16, 2018			Jeanne	Runner-up; Day 39
16	August 16, 2018			Tom	Sole Survivor; Day 39

== Episodes ==
No. overall	No. in season	Title	Timeline	Original release date
74	1	"Episode 1"	Days 1-3	May 3, 2018
Eighteen castaways were marooned in the Philippines and split into their tribes on a Bangka. Nico immediately introduced the first reward challenge of the season to the two tribes, Luzon (Red) and Mindanao (Blue).: Reward Challenge: On the bangka that the two tribes arrived on are supplies allocated for them over the 39 days. They have 2 minutes to collect as many supplies as possible, with a choice of either fishing gear, or a cage of chickens for their tribes. After the 2 minutes are up, the tribes must be off the bangka and paddle to the beach where they must untie a bag of rice hanging from a wooden structure. The first tribe to untie their bag of rice wins, with the losing tribe walking away without their bag of rice.; Mindanao won the challenge. At camp, Marthunis took charge with building the shelter. Dressed in a proper suit at the beginning of the game, Marthunis came across as aloof and alienating to the majority of the tribe. Werner used Marthunis' attempt of organizing the tribe's shelter construction to look for a hidden immunity idol or clue without anyone else bothering him. He succeeded in finding a clue for an idol that would be hidden in the first immunity challenge. Meanwhile, both Jeanne and Tevin expressed annoyance of Marthunis' behaviour around camp. Over at the Luzon tribe, Ace was already pinpointed as the outsider amongst Neil, Tom, and Seamus. However, Josie approached Ace to propose an alliance to placate his nervous demeanour.: Immunity Challenge: In pairs, four members of each tribe must swim out to a pyramid structure off shore to untie three bags of firemaking materials and a bundle of rope and wood. Once all four items have been retrieved, two members of the tribe must build a stick long enough for a third tribemate to use to reach a key inside of a locked wooden cage that holds the tribe's flint. Once the flint is freed from the cage, the final two members of each tribe must build a fire that will burn a rope and release a torch. Using their torch, the first tribe to ignite the sign of the season's logo wins immunity.; Mindanao won the challenge. Returning to camp from their immunity win, Tevin and PK expressed their frustration that they couldn't get rid of Marthunis and his melodramatic behaviour around camp. Tevin created a lie that Marthunis had found a clue on the Bangka back on Day 1, leading to Tevin, PK and others to look through Marthunis' personal belongings to find nothing. This caused concern for Werner, who did find a clue, and separated himself from the tribe to discard the now-useless clue before anyone could find it, since he couldn't retrieve the idol at the challenge. At Luzon, the men on the tribe had decided that Ace would be the rational vote to keep the tribe strong, however, Seamus approached Ace and the women of Luzon about blindsiding Tom, pointing out that Tom was a physical and social threat to dictate how the tribe would play throughout the game. Initially Annalize and Chané went along with this plan, but Seamus' scrambling too early in the game felt too fast for their liking. Chané informed Tom of the potential blindside, which blew up in Chané's face when Tom immediately confronted Seamus about his betrayal. The chaos eventually developed into a split between Tom's faction and Seamus's faction with Ace struggling to decide in the middle. Tom, Neil, and Josie all tried to talk to Ace over Night 2 and Day 3 about how his decision would impact his game. At Tribal Council, Neil revealed to Nico of the chaos of the last 24 hours since the immunity challenge loss, with both Seamus and Ace expressing their concerns of dull strategic gameplay from the tribe and which alliance to vote with respectively. Ultimately Ace sided with Chané and Tom over his initial ally, Josie, to help take out Seamus before he got the chance to betray the physical players in the tribe. In disbelief, Seamus became the first person voted out of the game.
75	2	"Episode 2"	Days 4-6	May 10, 2018
In low spirits after nearly being eliminated at Tribal Council the previous night, Tom sought to solidify his position with the voting block of Ace, Annalize, Chané and Neil, all the while proving to his tribe that he could make fire by eventually starting the tribe's fire. Over at Mindanao, the mood of the camp was that Marthunis was the primary target if they went to Tribal Council to keep tribal morale up.: Reward Challenge: Starting on a platform out in the sea, four members of each tribe must pull themselves across the water on a raft attached to a rope until they reach a climbable structure near the shore. On top of the structure are four keys that one at a time they must untie and collect, leaving the structure off a bamboo pole slide and hook their key onto a ring on the beach. Once all four keys are hooked on the shore, the other four tribe members must unlock one giant block each from locked cages before stacking the blocks in a tower. The first tribe to stack their block tower where no colour on the blocks are repeated on all four sides wins either chickens that were left behind on the marooning of Day 1, or a bag of rice.; Mindanao won the challenge. After a third straight challenge loss, Luzon's spirits were low; Josie, Palesa and Vusi especially felt alienated as the tribe's minority. Annalize, Chané, Neil and Tom all pledged to Ace that they owed him for siding with them on the first vote, but Ace still felt that he would be on the bottom of the "Big 5" alliance if he stuck with them. Knowing that she was down in numbers, Palesa searched and found a clue to a hidden immunity idol while foraging for food with Ace, the same clue that Werner had found over at Mindanao stating that the idol would be hidden at a future challenge. Mindanao celebrated by eating one of the chickens, with the tribe still annoyed with Marthunis' behaviour around camp. Two alliances were forming with Jeanne and Stacey-Lee in the middle; a Day 1 alliance with Tevin, PK and Toni, and an all-girls alliance with Murishca, Toni, and Katinka, while Werner and Marthunis were left on the outs of either alliance. In approaching Katinka, PK discovered and informed Tevin that Jeanne was also leading a women's alliance on the side, the two decided that Jeanne replaced Marthunis as priority number one. Meanwhile, the women's alliance started to feel alienated by PK and Tevin's constant paranoia around camp.: Immunity Challenge: Each tribe must build a stilt platform staircase puzzle the leads to a tower maze, after traversing the maze and sliding to the team mat, one tribe member must negotiate throw a bamboo maze with a key attached to string. Once this tribe member escapes the bamboo maze, do the rest of the tribe pass through the maze. Another tribe member must then chop through wood and rope to release puzzle pieces that contain a three-double digit combination that two tribe members must use to release their tribe flag. The first tribe to release their tribe's flag wins immunity.; Mindanao won the challenge. Morale sunk lower for Luzon returning after a fourth loss; the Big 5 had decided that Josie should be voted off next over Palesa. Josie, Palesa and Vusi felt that they needed to try to rope Ace back into their trust again, with Palesa subtly showing Ace the pouch that she found the hidden immunity idol clue right before Tribal Council as a means of creating doubt in his mind about the Tribal Council outcome. At Tribal Council, Josie pointed out that because of Seamus' actions, the tribe was split into two alliances at a faster rate than they would like. With the Big 5 feeling in control at the vote, Palesa's actions affected Ace and he flipped causing a tie between Josie and Annalize. A re-vote occurred to the disbelief of the Big 5, which ended in deadlock. As a result, the non-tied castaways drew rocks; the castaway who drew the white rock was eliminated. Neil, who had been assigned as the informal tribe leader, drew the white rock and was eliminated from the game.
76	3	"Episode 3"	Days 7-8	May 17, 2018
After Neil's blindside, Tom furiously told off Palesa, Josie, Vusi and Ace when they celebrated by the campfire. The morning after, Tom expressed his desire to get rid of Ace for flipping on the Big 5 alliance as soon as possible. At Mindanao, PK's paranoia of an all-woman's alliance led by Jeanne and Stacey-Lee was getting on the nerves of Tevin, leaving the two women feeling on the bottom when they felt that Marthunis should there instead.: Reward Challenge: Each tribe had to traverse a narrow balancing beam one by one to a platform over the water. Using their fellow tribe members, they can only touch one person at a time or they have to start again. If they fall off the beam, all who fell have to start again. The first tribe to have all members on the finishing platform wins camping chairs, hammocks and bedding.; Palesa's and Werner's idol clues indicated that their tribe's respective idols would be underneath their finishing platforms. During the challenge, Tom, Palesa, and Jeanne had noticed Luzon's idol with Tom instructing Chané to pick the Idol for him when she had completed the challenge. In the midst of informing Stacey-Lee of the Mindanao idol, Werner overheard Jeanne and bolted for the idol. Marthunis caught a glimpse of Werner's actions from the sit-out bench. Luzon beat Mindanao for the first time by a long margin, with Tom, Chané and Annalize celebrating the idol they had found, with the main Luzon alliance watching them from the camp knowing it was Palesa's clue that let Chané get it. At Mindanao, Werner revealed that he got an idol and offered to keep it for the tribe to use at the merge against Luzon. The tension at Mindanao had gotten to a point where parts of the tribe felt that they needed to throw the Immunity challenge in order to get rid of either Marthunis or Jeanne.: Immunity Challenge: Castaways must navigate through a three stage obstacle course collecting 6 pins and 2 wooden clubs. While traversing the second and third stages of the obstacle course, they can use the wooden clubs to bash open shortcuts. Once they have completed the obstacle course, they must carry a chest full of puzzle pieces with the 6 pins to their station to complete a 30 piece puzzle. For every shortcut used, they must complete a puzzle with 10 extra pieces. The first tribe to complete their puzzle wins immunity.; A majority of Mindanao had opted to throw the challenge, taking one shortcut and intentionally struggling with puzzles despite their prowess, giving Luzon their first immunity challenge victory. Werner and Toni were not happy about the tribe's decision, as they felt that it was too early in the game to throw challenges, and Jeanne desperately tried to secure that her alliance would be voting off Marthunis. The men and Murishca felt that today was going to be a simple vote against Jeanne, until Stacey-Lee started to express that she wanted out of the game. At Tribal Council, the tribe's frustrations with Marthunis was let out in the air, having his ethics and motives being criticized by Jeanne. The tribe questioned whether Stacey-Lee was trying to save Jeanne prior to Tribal Council by sacrificing herself and claiming that she was mentally and physically out despite medical clearance. Werner and Toni decided to take Stacey-Lee for her word and convinced their alliance that instead voting out someone else and Stacey quitting regardless that they respect her wishes. Though Tevin and Murishca hesitated to agree, they decided to send Stacey-Lee home instead of their target.
77	4	"Episode 4"	Days 9-10	May 24, 2018
After Tribal Council, Marthunis' fallout had put Werner, Tevin, and Toni on edge with the tantrum he threw, despite plans being made that they were pretending that Marthunis was on the outs, while Jeanne was still unaware of how close she was to being voted out instead of Stacey-Lee. The morning of Day 9 saw the tribes being redistributed from two to three, introducing a new yellow tribe called Visayas, before the reward challenge. Palesa claimed a clue to a hidden immunity idol during the tribe shuffle.: Reward Challenge: Castaways must crawl through a mudpit to reach and untie two keys. Each key opens gates along the challenge. The first gate unlocks a basket full of 15 sandbags on top of a giant pole that needs to be shaken down. Once all 15 bags are collected, the tribe can unlock the second gate which holds a swinging wooden platform; one tribe member at a time must throw the sandbags onto the swinging platform. The first tribe to land 3 sandbags onto their respective platform wins a new beach, and all the rewards that have been given out so far in the competition, while second place wins a set of spices and first pick of the original two tribe beaches.; The new Luzon tribe placed first, while the new Mindanao tribe placed second, choosing to live on the original Luzon beach by Annalize's suggestion. On the new Visayas tribe, at the old Mindanao camp, Tom and Chané immediately approached Murishca as the only former Mindanao member on the tribe. While Palesa and Vusi decided to let Tom's aggressive nature do all the work for them, Murishca, already annoyed with Tom's stubbornness at the reward challenge, was apprehensive to Tom's advances. Eventually Tom gave an ultimatum to Palesa on either siding with him and Chané, or being idoled out of the game. Palesa secretly read the clue she acquired at the shuffle pointing out that there was a hidden immunity idol placed at Tribal Council itself, giving her the option to get it the next time she visits, or save the location for later. The new Mindanao tribe arrived at the old Luzon camp, where they discovered that, despite the comforts and shelter, they had next to no food. Both Annalize and Katinka felt alienated by being around the three men, Marthunis, PK, and Tevin, but Annalize strove to make camp life comfortable with her catering background. Marthunis felt absolutely relieved for the shuffle, despite Tevin deciding that Marthunis needed to go next Tribal Council for being far too explosive and unreliable. Josie and Ace were left as the minority in the new Luzon tribe, while Toni was happy that Jeanne was still unaware of how close she was to leaving last night, so that she could be a number in the new Luzon. On Day 10, Ace and Josie saw a clue on the shelter they won that there was an idol in the sand between the shelter and the fireplace.: Immunity Challenge: Each tribe has to negotiate over and under hurdles and climb over a tilted net obstacle to reach a shelf platform with blocks in their tribe's colours. They must knock over all of their colour blocks, with one tribe member throwing at a time, before they can complete a stacked tower on the finishing platform. Once complete, the tribe must return to their mat and their tower stand for at least 3 seconds without falling. The first two tribes to stack their tower wins immunity.; Mindanao placed first and Visayas placed second, sending the new Luzon tribe to Tribal Council. Back at camp, Ace and Josie were desperate to find the new Luzon idol. They had the afternoon while the former Mindanao members were sleeping for Ace to dig, and Josie to keep watch. Ace continued to dig once everyone was awake under the guise that he was building a tunnel from the fireplace to under the shelter for heat insulation, to the former Mindanao members' confused annoyance. At Tribal Council, the former Luzon allies pointed out that there was no chance to find cracks in the former Mindanao, while Ace claimed to have found an idol. Werner brought the Mindanao idol in his position in case the original Luzon targeted him. They did, but Ace did not play an idol and was sent home.
78	5	"Episode 5"	Days 11-13	May 31, 2018
The morning after Tribal Council, Josie resolved herself to continue looking for the idol on the new Luzon beach, feeling the pressure of being the last original Luzon member in the tribe. While over at Mindanao, Marthunis confided to PK that he was considering voting for Tevin at the next Tribal Council, causing PK and Tevin to sit him down and reign him back into their alliance of three. Tensions at Visayas between Tom and Palesa were building as both of them were trying to sway Murishca to side with their alliance.: Immunity/Reward Challenge: While carrying two halves of a ladder rail, each tribe must climb over a cargo net structure and traverse a bamboo high step over obstacle. Sliding the rails over a one-chain bridge, they must build the rungs of the ladder and swing across to the end of the ladder. The rungs must then be used to build a bridge for the tribes to cross, and finally used to build a sliding puzzle. The first two tribes to complete the sliding puzzle win Immunity. The first tribe wins a feast of fruits, bread, and juice, while second place wins a large watermelon.; Mindanao placed first and Luzon placed second, sending Visayas to Tribal Council. Marthunis' behaviour continued to alienate the other original Mindanao members back at camp while they enjoyed reward, with Katinka taking time away from the men to go explore the reefs by herself. With Luzon trailing behind for most of the challenge due to Jeanne struggling physically due to her height, Werner felt that Jeanne should possibly leave next if the tribe needs to remain strong before the merge. Josie tried to propose an all-girls alliance with Toni to capitalize on Werner's paranoia, but Toni flat-out rejected the offer. Tensions boiled over at Visayas after the challenge with Tom and Palesa getting into a heated argument over food rations, both threatening to use idols at Tribal Council that night. Chané eventually figured out that Murishca was playing both sides of the original Luzon members and warned Tom that Murishca shouldn't be trusted. Tribal Council started with Palesa getting up to grab the idol hidden at Tribal Council to the surprise of the tribe besides Vusi, which let the split tribe dynamic out into the open. Murishca expressed that she was indeed the swing vote, but the back and forth between alliances were taking a toll on her mentally and questioned whether she should continue or not. Nico offered Visayas an opportunity to strategize mid-Tribal to decide on the vote, with Tom and Chané switching their vote to Murishca, and Vusi, Palesa, and Murishca decided to split between Tom and Chané. Tom played his idol, while Palesa did not, and Murishca's indecisiveness caused the warring factions to send her home instead.
79	6	"Episode 6"	Days 14-16	June 7, 2018
The morning of Day 13 started with Chané decided that she needed to step away from Tom, after he foolishly played their idol on himself after Murishca had resigned herself from the game. She approached Palesa and Vusi to inform them she was done following Tom. At Mindanao, the tribe's frustration with Marthunis' erratic behaviour was reaching a breaking point, with Marthunis himself noticing he was backing himself into a corner he couldn't get out of.: Immunity/Reward challenge: Four members of each tribe must stand side by side holding up three wooden discs using only the palm of their hands. The last tribe to remain holding at least one wooden disc wins immunity, and a burger braai feast for reward.; Visayas won the challenge, sending both Luzon and Mindanao to a joint Tribal Council. Returning from the challenge, Marthunis announced that he wanted the tribe to vote him out, claiming that the isolation and boredom of the game after two weeks was getting to him and that he wanted to go home, to the relief of Annalize as the only former Luzon member in Mindanao. Josie, also feeling the pressure of being the lone original Luzon member in Luzon, desperately tried to sway Toni away from her alliance partner, Werner, who saw an opportunity to find the idol that Ace was digging for. He discovered it in front of Jeanne, to Toni's chagrin. At the joint Tribal Council, Annalize expressed to Nico that the vote tonight for Mindanao would be easy as Marthunis had asked for the tribe to send him home. After listening to Marthunis' reasons, Nico told him to leave Tribal Council immediately without his torch being snuffed, and informed Mindanao that they still had to vote regardless. Both Annalize and Josie expressed the fact that they were the likely people to leave as neither were original Mindanao, with Tevin expressing that original tribal unity was more important as the Visayas tribe would be their main priority at the merge. Josie and Annalize were indeed voted out, however, Nico informed the two that they were swapping tribes instead of leaving and would select another tribe member to join their new tribe. Josie chose Toni to reunite with Mindanao, and Annalize chose Katinka for Luzon.
80	7	"Episode 7"	Days 17-18	June 14, 2018
After the surprise shuffle vote at Tribal Council, Annalize and Josie both felt nothing had changed as being the only original Luzon on each tribe, though both Luzon and Mindanao were now openly planning for the eventual merge. With Toni moving back to Mindanao, Werner grew paranoid about his position in Luzon. Jeanne openly plotting with Annalize made Werner consider flipping to original Luzon once the merge occurred. At Mindanao, Tevin felt Josie's intellect and beauty would be a distraction for him, and that he'd need to get rid of her before it would be too late.: Reward challenge: Using ropes, barrels and planks, each tribe has to traverse an obstacle course to collect 3 puzzle bags. Once all three puzzle bags are collected, two members of the tribe must solve a large circular puzzle. The first tribe to complete the puzzle wins a choice between a pizza party, and two jars of beans to cook. The second tribe to complete their puzzle takes home the remaining reward.; Mindanao placed first and Luzon placed second. Tom's aggressive nature during the challenges and in camp life made Visayas consider throwing a challenge to get rid of him before the merge. Chané and Palesa were concerned about how Tom would be on the jury if he made the merge, but Vusi was against the idea of throwing a challenge to get rid of Tom. Over at Mindanao, PK and Toni touched base since the first shuffle over allegiances of the original Mindanao members. PK was getting restless being under Tevin's thumb since Day 1 and offered Toni the option of getting rid of Tevin now and not after merge. In response, she revealed that Werner had found a second idol at the new Luzon beach. Tevin was adamant that Josie had to leave, as the numbers leading up to merge were getting too tight for his liking.: Immunity challenge: Swimming from a platoon in the ocean, one tribe member at a time had to untie 3 sets of buoys netted underwater. Once all three sets were released, the tribes have to swim to shore and stack all 15 buoys onto their shelves for one tribe member to shoot hoops with the buoys. First two tribes to land 10 buoys into their hoop won immunity.; Mindanao was obliterated in the immunity challenge by Luzon and Visayas, with Tevin and Toni struggling to release their buoys in the water. Back at camp, Tevin was confident that Mindanao was going to stick together and send Josie home, and re-iterated the fact at Tribal Council. However, PK's comments to Nico and the whispering between PK and Toni informed Tevin that they were going to flip on him. He desperately tried to dissuade PK from making a big move too soon before the merge, but it fell on deaf ears, sending the doctor packing.
81	8	"Episode 8"	Days 19-21	June 21, 2018
After Tevin's blindside, Mindanao felt certain that they had flipped the game away from original tribal lines before the merge had even began. Werner had resigned himself to sticking with the women at Luzon to the end of the game, sticking to a social approach at camp. Jeanne and the women considered Werner as their shield to get to the end. Katinka started to step up in the strategic discussions around camp, and approaching Werner and Annalize about taking out Jeanne if push comes to shove. Visayas had depleted their food supply and were desperate for reward.: Reward challenge: Bound by their hands and feet, three tribe members must crawl their way across a relay sand dune obstacle course, passing along a bag full of puzzle pieces. Once the final tribe member finished the relay, one of them must complete a snake puzzle using pieces from the bag. The first tribe to complete their puzzle wins a chocolate feast and fountain meal at camp, with second receiving a jar of jelly beans.; Visayas placed first and Luzon placed second. Vusi's success in finishing for Visayas at the challenges was getting onto the nerves of Luzon and Mindanao, with Visayas enjoying their dessert feast they sorely needed. At Luzon, Werner approached Annalize about the possibility of removing Jeanne and forming a bond to the end, with her not committing to his plans. Toni's frustration after their second defeat in a row soured the camp's mood for Josie and PK.: Immunity challenge: Tethered along a rope obstacle course, each tribe member must traverse the course to reach a ball one after each other. Once all 3 balls have been collected, one tribe member must use a pulley to lift the balls into 3 holes at the top of their tribe's board.; Sitting out of the immunity challenge, Annalize and Chané caught up on what has been happening on Visayas and Luzon: Chané revealed to Annalize that Palesa is in possession of an idol and that she was ready to vote Tom out immediately. Toni's frustration and anger reached its peak after Mindanao lost immunity again, as the tribe's decision to flip on Tevin was to have a unified new alliance entering the merge. This loss put Josie back on the bottom, though she tried to persuade Toni that siding with her original Luzon alliance of Palesa and Vusi would be in Toni's best interest. At Tribal Council, all three expressed concerned with the future as a tribe of two before the merge, stating that original tribal lines are dead nonetheless. However, PK and Toni stuck together to finally send Josie home.
82	9	"Episode 9"	Days 22-25	June 28, 2018
A depleted and exhausted PK and Toni on Mindanao found out on the morning of Day 22 that they had made it to the merge, alongside Visayas and Luzon. Gathered to a merge feast and a new tribe beach, the final 10 formed the merge tribe of Araw. Straight off the bat, Vusi and Werner approached each other about a potential alliance to remove Tom, while PK was adamant on flipping on the original Mindanao to take out Jeanne first and Tom second, to Toni's annoyance. Meanwhile, the women and Werner of original Mindanao had their sights set on Vusi due to his challenge performances.: Immunity challenge: The castaways would stand barefoot on wooden slats on an a-frame that was floating out in the water and try to remain balanced on top of the a-frame. After 10 minutes, the castaways would move up to a second set of slats making balancing more difficult. After another 20 minutes, the castaways would move to the top of the a-frame where they would have to balance until the end of the challenge. The last castaway remaining on the a-frame would win immunity.; Toni won immunity. Realizing that the numbers weren't there for the Visayas alliance to take out Tom, Chané, Palesa, and PK all approached Tom to align with them. Werner had connected with Tom due to the lack of men on his tribes since Ace had left. Toni attempted to make use of PK's failing allegiance by getting him to flush Palesa' idol, but the Blue Blood alliance targeted Vusi while Vusi, Palesa, and Chané switched their target to Katinka as a social threat. At Tribal Council, PK's loyalty was put to the test, with Chané and Vusi pointing out that there was a kingpin in the Blue Blood alliance that was dictating the game. Annalize declared that she had cut ties with her original Luzon members. At the vote, PK stuck with Toni's decoy plan of voting for Palesa due to the lack of numbers, with Visayas voting for Katinka, and Tom flipping, sending a non-surprised Vusi to the jury.
83	10	"Episode 10"	Days 26-27	July 5, 2018
The Mindanao alliance comforted a crying Katinka, who received votes from the Visayas camp except for Tom. While the women supported her, PK rationalized why the Visayas alliance had voted the way they did.: Reward challenge: Divided into two teams of four, two members of each team must paddle on a raft off the shore to a buoy and return to collect 4 sets of paddles. Once they arrive to shore, the team must unscramble letters on the paddles to reveal the phrase "A Win Tastes Good." The first team to complete the puzzle wins a hot dog and beer feast at camp, and letters from home. The castaway not selected for the challenge received the food portion of the reward during the challenge.; Chané, Palesa, Toni and Werner won the challenge, and PK, as the unselected castaway, joined them on the reward. At the reward, PK was set aside from the challenge by Tom, who was creating favour with Werner's alliance. He found a clue to a hidden immunity idol with the hot dog and beer reward, and kept it to himself. After reward, he confronted Tom with his behaviour at camp alienating the women, with the original Mindanao women siding with Tom over PK. Tom tried to berate PK for being drunk from the reward, but PK was not having any of it. While Werner was enjoying his letter from home, PK went to the tribe's water supply to dig up an immunity idol.: Immunity challenge: Leaning off a platform, each tribe member must hold on by a knotted rope. At regular intervals, they must lean further over the water and hold onto longer sections of rope. The last person left holding onto their rope and not fall into the water wins immunity.; Katinka won immunity. Werner decided that he needed to step up in voicing his opinions within his alliance, deciding that PK had to go first to control the numbers of the Mindanao alliance. He informed Toni that the target was Chané, but she was skeptical with Werner's safe choice and Katinka's casual slip that she was on the bottom of the Mindanao alliance. Chané attempted to try and reconnect with Annalize, trying to sway her away from Werner's influence, but Annalize was laying low about how far gone she was away from the original Luzon tribe. At Tribal Council, PK laid out the pecking order that Werner was kingpin, with Jeanne, Katinka, and Annalize as the final 4, with Tom as a number and Toni and himself on the outs with Chané and Palesa. Jeanne stepped up for Tom's defense and berated the Visayas women for their treatment of Tom, but Palesa and Chané stood their ground about Tom's reckless behaviour at camp pre-merge. When it came to voting, Palesa finally played her idol, which encouraged a skeptical PK to play his newly found idol, to the shock of the entire tribe and jury. Werner, going on his earlier belief that he'd play an idol if a target played an idol, used one of his idols. The votes revealed to PK and Toni of the alliance's blindside attempt on PK, with Palesa and PK voting for Werner, leaving the votes to be tied between Tom and Chané with one vote each. With their blindside having backfired, the Mindanao alliance voted off Chané, their decoy target, and sent her to the jury.
84	11	"Episode 11"	Days 28-29	July 12, 2018
Furious after finding out that the majority alliance wanted to take out PK, Toni blew up on Werner aligning himself with weaker players like Katinka, who had given PK enough information that he was the target for the vote, instead of his original alliance with her. The women started to distance themselves from Toni as her emotional backlash was getting to young Katinka's nerves.: Reward challenge: Provided with a wheel and a ball, each castaway must spin their respective ball in their wheel while standing on a balancing beam. In 5 minute intervals, the castaways must step forward onto narrower parts of the beam. The last castaway to remain spinning without falling off or losing momentum wins a tapas meal with wine, and a night's sleep in a bed at camp with another castaway of their choosing.; Palesa won the challenge. Despite open trash talk from Tom, Palesa chose him to join her on the reward, to everyone's surprise. While enjoying the reward, Palesa searched the bed for a clue, and found an idol instead. Knowing that she had no chance of breaking the Mindanao alliance, she asked Tom to inform her if she was going, so that she could use the idol.: Immunity challenge: The castaways held a rope attached to an unbalanced table to keep the table level, while maneuvering between two platforms retrieving and stacking blocks with letters on them; if their stack dropped, they had to restart. The first castaway to stack all eight blocks in correct order, spelling "IMMUNITY", won the challenge.; Werner won immunity. With PK and Palesa vulnerable outside of the majority, Katinka wanted to split the vote in case PK played an idol. Werner decided to let the alliance choose who would get voted out to lie low. Palesa chose to keep quiet about her idol, and Tom said to her that she was safe for the vote. At Tribal Council, PK and Toni highlighted that Werner was on a free ride to win, suggesting players like Katinka weren't aware that their game would not be respected by the jury, yet again Jeanne defended the alliance's gameplay of safe voting can work for certain players. In fear that PK had an idol, Jeanne and the majority decided to load their votes onto Palesa, with her being voted out with an unknown idol in her pocket and into the jury.
85	12	"Episode 12"	Day 30	July 19, 2018
The previous Tribal Council revealed to Werner and the majority alliance that Toni had finally realized that the original Mindanao alliance is dead, and that her days are numbered without flipping people from the majority. However, the alliance still wanted Toni and PK out, with Tom as a back-up plan. Annalize was threatened by Jeanne's performances at Tribal Council despite her lack of strategic gameplay.: Reward/Immunity challenge: The castaways must traverse over three balancing obstacles, carrying stacks of picture blocks to back to the start. They must recreate the stacks in a three by three stack. The first to correctly stack their blocks wins a restaurant feast with cocktails, and immunity.; Tom won the challenge and chose to share reward with Jeanne and Werner, as a thank you for the protection they have given to Tom throughout the merge and to formulate a final three. Tom was then surprised with the task to exile two players from the rest of the tribe. Toni whispered to be exiled, while Tom decided both her and Annalize were to be exiled. The two in exile discovered an extra vote that Toni decided that the two of them must share among themselves. Annalize started working on Toni to give her the extra vote if Toni were to be voted out that night. That left Katinka and PK back at the Araw beach to relax and bond. Towards the end of the day, the three groups were instructed to head off to Tribal Council without regrouping back at camp. At the reward, Tom, Jeanne and Werner decided that PK had to go, but at Tribal Council, Katinka flipped the alliance's vote onto Toni. Toni, with harsh parting words to Werner and Jeanne, left her hat as she joined the jury, trusting the extra vote into Annalize's hands.
86	13	"Episode 13"	Days 31-33	July 26, 2018
Stunned by Toni's parting words, Werner and Jeanne laughed at the perception that they were running the show on Araw, given that Katinka was the one who gave the orders to vote out Toni at the last Tribal Council. Using Katinka's inability to keep a secret about her alliances' goals, PK tried to stir up camp life by informing Tom of the final 3 deal Tom has with Werner and Katinka. Tom immediately went to Werner about this, causing paranoia among the tribe. Jeanne didn't believe the commotion for a second and tried to consolidate with Katinka that the final 3 is the two of them and Werner, while Annalize started to feel that a big move needed to happen to shake things up. Before the auction began, PK pulled Katinka and Werner aside to try and convince them to keep him around longer than Jeanne, as he was aware they are stringing Jeanne along. During the Survivor auction, PK was offered an advantage over a meal he bid on, but he refused, and Katinka bought an advantage instead.: Immunity challenge: Using a large scale pinball table as a timer, each castaway must complete a four by five block puzzle. If their ball falls into the chute at the end of the pinball table, they must stop building their puzzle until the ball drops to the bottom of the chute. The first castaway to complete their puzzle wins immunity. Katinka's advantage allowed her to carry on working on her puzzle until the ball reaches the end of the chute only once in the challenge.; Werner won the challenge. Amidst the chaos around camp, Katinka considered getting rid of Jeanne first before PK, to Werner's chagrin, and Annalize tried to rally people so that she could use the extra vote she found with Toni. Katinka approached Annalize about the option to get rid of Jeanne, while PK was eager to do anything to stay in the game. At Tribal Council, PK explained to Nico that the alliance was unbreakable due to people constantly approaching Werner after any discussion, and that any final 3 talk had Werner and Katinka mentioned as a means to get people to change their minds. However, the alliance of the third Luzon tribe and Tom stuck together to send PK to the jury, and Annalize deciding not to use her extra vote.
87	14	"Episode 14"	Days 34-35	August 2, 2018
The last Tribal Council left Jeanne furious that her game was constantly berated by people joining the jury, with Werner acknowledging that possibly voting out Jeanne might calm a potential jury. Annalize informed Katinka that she had an extra vote from Exile Island. Katinka approached Tom with a plan to blindside Werner, but Tom went to Werner afterwards to reveal Katinka's plotting against the pastor.: Reward challenge: In a surprise family visit, the castaways are tethered to a rope and navigate through a three staged obstacle course, the first castaway to finish the course, to where their loved ones are standing, wins an afternoon with their loved one enjoying a Filipino barbecue and take home a Huawei P20 smartphone.; Werner won reward and chose to share it with Katinka and Tom. Back at camp, Annalize started to use PK's words against Jeanne to work her against Werner. During the reward, both Tom and Katinka consulted with their loved ones (Tom's wife and Katinka's mother, respectively) about betraying Werner, with both loved ones encouraging them to do so.: Immunity challenge: The castaways must stack 10 bowls on top of a spring loaded wire structure, using a long pole to move the bowls through the structure. The first to complete their tower stack wins immunity.; Tom was emotional after his immunity win, knowing that he was an easy potential vote for the alliance if he had lost. With Werner declaring to the tribe that he was using his idol, he was preparing to blindside Jeanne as a means to make amends with the jury. However, Tom's concerns of Katinka and Annalize's bond made the men decide to flip the vote onto Katinka, with Tom repeating Katinka's plans to betray Werner at Final 4. At Tribal Council, Jeanne was still under the impression that Annalize was the target, while Annalize and Katinka used the extra vote to pile votes onto Jeanne. However, Werner decided to shock the tribe and jury by playing his idol on Jeanne. Annalize, feeling that she was going home instead of Jeanne, was left stunned when the men's votes revealed that they were sending Katinka to the jury instead.
88	15	"Episode 15"	Days 36-37	August 9, 2018
Stunned by the previous vote, Jeanne was grateful for Werner saving her game with the immunity idol. Werner consolidated a final two deal with Tom, knowing that at least Jeanne and Tom would take him to the end if such a scenario.: Reward challenge: The castaways must set up domino blocks onto a balancing beam, with said beam attached to a knee high wooden structure that can knock the blocks over at any given moment. The first castaway to set up all their blocks, and push the entire train in order to hit a gong at the end of the balancing beam wins an overnight spa and massage experience and a second Huawei P20 smartphone.; Tom won reward and chose to share it with Jeanne. She used the time away from the camp to persuade Tom that Werner's game has become far too threatening for the rest of them to compete against at Final Tribal Council. Tom finally came to terms with the fact that he had to betray Werner at some point to have any chance to win with how the jury has formed over the season. Back at camp, Annalize and Werner decided to try and have a strategic talk free time, with Werner using that time for jury management.: Immunity challenge: The castaways have to navigate to stations distributed around a giant Dragon styled maze to collect four puzzle bags one at a time. Returning to the start of the maze, the first castaway to complete a hanging 3D puzzle of a dragon wins Immunity.; Despite being a non-threat in the majority of the challenges, Jeanne pulled out a shocking win, and used the win as an opportunity to set differences aside with Annalize and Tom to take out Werner. The jury expressed disbelief that Jeanne was immune. With no more idols or advantages left in the game, Werner stated at Tribal Council that he felt vulnerable for the first time in a while and tried to paint a target on Annalize's social game. His pleas fell short of convincing his allies to keep him on their deals, and was sent to the jury.
89	16	"Philippines Finale & Reunion"	Days 38-39	August 16, 2018
Reward/Immunity challenge: Contestants placed a ball down a chute and caught it before restarting the process. At regular intervals, more balls would be added. If a ball was dropped, that castaway would be eliminated. The last castaway standing would not only receive immunity, but had the power to vote someone off the jury and single-handedly send one of the remaining two castaways in his or her place.; Jeanne came from behind to win her second immunity challenge, and the opportunity to vote out a jury member at Tribal Council. She tried to figure out whether Tom's role as social pariah throughout the game would be better to face than Annalize's favourable relationships with the entire jury. At Tribal Council, she decided that Annalize's relationships with the jury was more threatening, sending her straight to the jury. After Annalize joined the jury, Nico revealed to the jury that Jeanne also won the opportunity to remove a jury member a night before Final Tribal Council. After a long afternoon figuring out whether Werner or Toni on the jury was detrimental to her game, Jeanne voted Werner off the jury. On Day 39, the jury berated both Jeanne and Tom for their gameplay leading up to the Final Tribal Council. PK and Toni accused Jeanne of doing nothing strategically to get to the end, with Toni calling Werner's removal from the jury Jeanne's biggest mistake. Vusi tore into Tom about having a childish and selfish behaviour that permeated throughout the season. Jeanne admitted that luck played a part of her game, and that adapting her game early and laying low behind Werner were crucial moves on her part. Tom kept apologizing for his actions around camp life, but highlighted his loyalty to Werner throughout the merge as his biggest strength, with Palesa acknowledging that despite the growing target on his back Tom still made it to the end. After a rough Final Tribal Council, with Vusi sticking to his word of voting against Tom, a 6-1 vote saw Tom's perseverance rewarded over Jeanne's strategic luck and him being declared the Ultimate Survivor.

== Voting history ==
	Original tribes					First Swap			Tribe Swap vote (Note: On Day 16, a double Tribal Council was held where both tribes unknowingly voted for a castaway to be swapped to the other tribe.)		Second Swap		Merge tribe									
Episode	1	2			3	4	5	6			7	8	9	10		11	12	13	14		15	16
Day	3	6			8	11	13	16			18	21	25	27		29	30	33	35		37	38
Eliminated	Seamus	Tie (Note: The first Tribal Council Vote resulted in a tie. Per the rules, a second vote was held where the castaways involved in the tie would not vote and the remaining castaways could only vote for those who tied.)	Tie (Note: After two rounds of voting, Tribal Council remained tied. Per the rules, the non-tied castaways would be eliminated by random draw.)	Neil	Stacey-Lee	Ace	Murishca	Marthunis	Josie (Note: Instead of being eliminated from the game, Josie and Annalize switched tribes, and each were instructed to bring another tribemate with them. Josie and Toni were sent to Mindanao, while Annalize and Katinka were switched to Luzon.)	Annalize	Tevin	Josie	Vusi	Tie	Chané	Palesa	Toni	PK	Katinka		Werner	Annalize
Votes	5–4	4–4	3–3	Rock Draw (Note: Due to a deadlocked tie after two rounds of voting between Annalize and Josie, the non-tied contestants—Ace, Chané, Neil, Palesa, Tom and Vusi—drew rocks to resolve the vote; Neil picked the white rock and was therefore eliminated.)	6–2–1	3–2	3–1–0 (Note: Tom played a hidden immunity idol on himself, therefore one vote against him was not counted.)	Quit (Note: No vote: Marthunis chose to quit the game.)	3–1	3–1	3–1	2–1	5–3–2	1–1–0–0 (Note: PK and Werner each played a hidden immunity idol on themselves, therefore five votes and two votes against them respectively were not counted.)	5–2	6–2	5–2	5–1	2–1–0 (Note: Werner played a hidden immunity idol on Jeanne, therefore three votes against her were not counted.)		3–1	1–0
Voter	Vote																					
Tom	Seamus	Josie	Josie	Black rock			Murishca						Vusi	~~PK~~	None (Note: Chané and Tom were not eligible to vote in the second round of voting.)	Palesa	PK	PK	Katinka		Werner	None
Jeanne					Stacey-Lee	Ace			Josie				Vusi	~~PK~~	Chané	Palesa	Toni	PK	Annalize		Werner	Annalize
Annalize	Seamus	Josie	None (Note: Annalize and Josie were not eligible to vote in the second round of voting.)	Immune						Katinka			Vusi	~~PK~~	Chané	Palesa	Toni	PK	~~Jeanne~~	~~Jeanne~~ (Note: Extra Vote: Annalize used an extra vote at this tribal council on Jeanne.)	Werner	None
Werner					Stacey-Lee	Ace			Josie				Vusi	~~PK~~	Chané	Palesa	Toni	PK	Katinka		Annalize	
Katinka					Stacey-Lee					Annalize			Vusi	~~PK~~	Chané	Palesa	Toni	PK	~~Jeanne~~			
PK					Jeanne					Annalize	Tevin	Josie	Palesa	~~Werner~~	Tom	Katinka	Toni	Annalize				
Toni					Stacey-Lee	Ace			Josie		Tevin	Josie	Palesa	Chané	Chané	Palesa	PK					
Palesa	Tom	Annalize	Annalize	Black rock			Murishca						Katinka	~~Werner~~	Tom	Katinka						
Chané	Seamus	Josie	Josie	Black rock			Murishca						Katinka	Tom	None							
Vusi	Tom	Annalize	Annalize	Black rock			Chané						Katinka									
Josie	Tom	Annalize	None	Immune		Werner			Jeanne		Tevin	PK										
Tevin					Stacey-Lee					Annalize	Josie											
Marthunis					Werner																	
Murishca					Stacey-Lee		~~Tom~~															
Ace	Seamus	Annalize	Annalize	Black rock		Werner																
Stacey-Lee					Werner																	
Neil	Seamus	Josie	Josie	White rock																		
Seamus	Tom																					

Jury vote
Episode	16	
Day	39	
Finalist	Tom	Jeanne
Votes	6–1	
Juror	Vote	
Annalize	Tom	
Werner	None (Note: For winning the final immunity challenge, Jeanne also earned the power to eliminate a juror. She chose Werner.)	
Katinka	Tom	
PK	Tom	
Toni	Tom	
Palesa	Tom	
Chané	Tom	
Vusi		Jeanne
