= Survivor South Africa: Return of the Outcasts =

Ninth season of Survivor South Africa

- Season 9
- Presented by: Nico Panagio
- No. of days: 39
- No. of castaways: 20
- Winner: Dino Paulo
- Runner-up: Shane Hattingh
- Location: Sunshine Coast, Eastern Cape
- No. of episodes: 24

Release
- Original network: M-Net
- Original release: 18 July – 25 August 2022

Additional information
- Filming dates: 17 January – 24 February 2022

Season chronology
- ← Previous; Immunity Island

Survivor South Africa: Return of the Outcasts is the ninth season of the South African reality competition show, Survivor South Africa. Announced on 25 November 2021, the season was scheduled for broadcast on M-Net in July 2022.

The season is the first all-returning player season of Survivor South Africa, with 20 contestants from between Maldives and Immunity Island onwards returning. Return of the Outcasts is the seventh season hosted by Nico Panagio and was produced by Afrokaans Film & Television. For this season, the grand prize was doubled to R2 million. The season premiered on 18 July 2022 airing four episodes a week, and the cast was announced on 5 June 2022; with the tribe division based upon if castaways had made it to the merge portion of their previous season or not. On the season finale, broadcast on 25 August 2022, Season 8 Pre-Merger, Dino Paulo, was crowned Sole Survivor in a 7-2 vote against Season 5 Post-Merger, Shane Hattingh.

== Contestants ==
The cast is composed of 20 returning players from past seasons of Survivor South Africa. The blue 'Masu' tribe consists of 10 players who made the merge on their previous season, while the red 'Yontau' tribe were 10 players who only played in the pre-merge portion of their respective seasons. The tribe names – Yontau and Masu – come from the Vulcan words for fire and water respectively. The tribes were randomly shuffled on Day 12, with 15 players left in the game. With an advantage hidden in the game, Marian used Diplomatic Immunity to swap from Yontau to Masu on Day 18. After Tribal Council on Day 19, the final 11 players merged to form the yellow 'Salan' (Vulcan for wind) tribe.

List of Survivor South Africa: Return of the Outcasts contestants
Contestant	Original tribe	Switched Tribe	Post-Diplomatic (Note: Finding a Diplomatic Immunity advantage, one tribe member during the Pre-Merge phase can elect to switch tribes after an Immunity challenge before Nico dismisses the tribes. On Day 18, Marian elected to use Diplomatic Immunity to swap from Yontau to Masu.)	Merged Tribe	Finish
Francois "Chappies" Chapman; 33, Centurion, Gauteng; Immunity Island	Masu				1st voted out Day 3
Pheko "PK" Phetoe; 31, Lephalale, Limpopo; Philippines	Masu				2nd voted out Day 5
Tania Copeland; 53, Paternoster, Western Cape; Island of Secrets	Yontau				3rd voted out Day 7
Tevin Naidu; 28, Cape Town, Western Cape; Philippines	Yontau				4th voted out Day 9
Seamus Holmes; 29, Durban, Kwa-Zulu Natal; Philippines	Yontau				5th voted out Day 11
Shona MacDonald; 33, Cape Town, Western Cape; Champions	Yontau	Yontau (Note: At the Tribe Swap, Shona selected a yellow vial, meaning she got the choice of which tribe she could join. She chose to remain on Yontau.)			6th voted out Day 14
Noleen "Pinty" Nkanjeni; 31, Cape Town, Western Cape; Immunity Island	Yontau	Masu			7th voted out Day 15
Thoriso M-Afrika; 37, Uitenhage, Eastern Cape; Immunity Island	Yontau	Masu			8th voted out Day 17
Palesa Tau; 31, Johannesburg, Gauteng; Philippines	Masu	Yontau	Yontau		9th voted out Day 19
Antoinette "Toni" Tebbutt; 41, Cape Town, Western Cape; Philippines	Masu	Masu	Masu	Salan	10th voted out 1st jury member Day 21
Danté de Villiers; 33, Dwarskersbos, Western Cape; Island of Secrets	Masu	Yontau	Yontau	Salan	11th voted out 2nd jury member Day 23
Steffi Brink; 30, Midrand, Gauteng; Island of Secrets	Masu	Masu	Masu	Salan	12th voted out 3rd jury member Day 25
Meryl Szolkiewicz; 33, Centurion, Gauteng; Island of Secrets	Masu	Yontau	Yontau	Salan	13th voted out 4th jury member Day 27
Tejan Pillay; 42, Johannesburg, Gauteng; Maldives	Masu	Masu	Masu	Salan	14th voted out 5th jury member Day 30
Felix Godlo; 32, Pretoria, Gauteng; Island of Secrets	Yontau	Masu	Masu	Salan	15th voted out 6th jury member Day 33
Killarney Jones; 52, Benoni, Gauteng; Champions	Yontau	Masu	Masu	Salan	16th voted out 7th jury member Day 35
Philip "Phil" Dickson; 40, Johannesburg, Gauteng; Champions	Yontau	Yontau	Yontau	Salan	17th voted out 8th jury member Day 37
Marian de Vos; 33, Cape Town, Western Cape; Champions	Masu	Yontau	Masu	Salan	18th voted out 9th jury member Day 38
Shane Hattingh; 50, Bryanston, Gauteng; Champions	Masu	Yontau	Yontau	Salan	Runner-Up; Day 39
Dino Paulo; 31, Johannesburg, Gauteng; Immunity Island	Yontau	Yontau	Yontau	Salan	Sole Survivor; Day 39

== Season summary ==
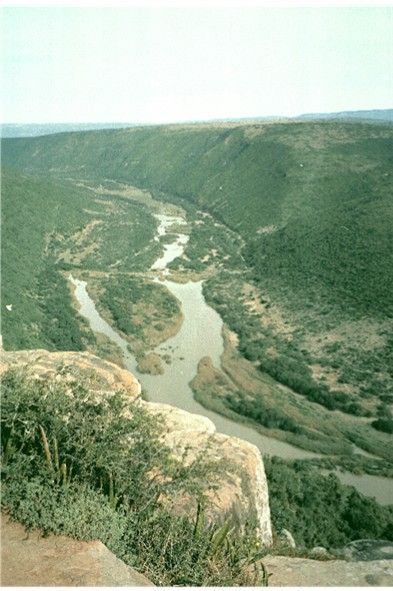
The season was filmed in the Sunshine Coast of the Eastern Cape.

The game began with 20 players divided into two tribes competing for a 2-million Rand prize. The players who were eliminated post-merge in their prior season made up the blue Masu tribe, while the players who were eliminated pre-merge in their prior season made up the red Yontau tribe. Though Masu lost the first two immunity challenges, a win streak gave them the numbers going into a tribe swap. The most prolific alliances on each starting tribe were the Breakfast Club on Masu made up primarily of past in-game relationships (which later birthed a "Full Package" trio among Steffi, Marian, and Meryl that gained power due to the advantages the women obtained) and the No-B.S. Alliance on Yontau between Dino, Felix, and Phil. The Philippines players found themselves outnumbered on both tribes, resulting in early eliminations for players like PK, Tevin, and Palesa, the latter of which was the result of a surprise double Tribal Council that took place right before the merge.

The new Salan tribe saw the Breakfast Club and the No-B.S. Alliance vying for power. The latter alliance ultimately won out by convincing the others to turn on each other and blindside Dante, the perceived strategic leader of the Breakfast Club. This gave Dino, Felix, and Phil the ammunition they needed to dismantle the Breakfast Club (voting out free agents Tejan and Killarney in the process as well), but the three of them eventually also turned on each other. Phil went on an unprecedented immunity run to keep himself safe, but his luck ran out at the Final 4.

Dino, Shane, and Marian made up the final three. Dino won the final immunity challenge with the castaways' loved ones present, and his fiancee urged him to do what he needs to do (that being, vote out Marian as the bigger threat between her and Shane). At the Final Tribal Council, Dino's strategic dominance won out over Shane's perseverance despite being an underdog, and the jury voted him the sole survivor in a 7–2 decision.

Challenge winners and eliminations by episode
Episode			Challenge winner(s)		The Outpost	Eliminated	Finish
No.	Title	Air date	Reward	Immunity	The Outpost	Eliminated	Finish
1 2	"Twice the Game" "Survivor 101"	July 18, 2022 July 19, 2022	Masu	Yontau	Seamus, Thoriso	Chappies	1st voted out Day 3
1 2	"Twice the Game" "Survivor 101"	July 18, 2022 July 19, 2022	Masu	Yontau	Shane, Steffi	Chappies	1st voted out Day 3
3	"The Ghost of Your Past Game"	July 20, 2022	Yontau (Note: Combined reward and immunity challenge.)			PK	2nd voted out Day 5
4	"Walking on Eggshells"	July 21, 2022	Masu			Tania	3rd voted out Day 7
5	"The Rope Dealer"	July 25, 2022	Masu			Tevin	4th voted out Day 9
6	"Sharp Tools"	July 26, 2022	Yontau	Masu		Seamus	5th voted out Day 11
6	"Sharp Tools"	July 26, 2022	[Tejan, Toni] (Note: The Yontau tribe were told to invite two castaway from Masu on their reward; they chose Tejan and Toni.)	Masu		Seamus	5th voted out Day 11
7 8	"Expect the Unexpected This is Gonna Be a Life Long Torture"	July 27, 2022 July 28, 2022	Masu		Danté	Shona	6th voted out Day 14
7 8	"Expect the Unexpected This is Gonna Be a Life Long Torture"	July 27, 2022 July 28, 2022	Masu		Tejan	Shona	6th voted out Day 14
9	"A Flat Out No"	August 1, 2022	Yontau			Pinty	7th voted out Day 15
10	"The Don"	August 2, 2022	Yontau			Thoriso	8th voted out Day 17
11 12	"Spanners in the Works Guess What, You Are a Number!"	August 3, 2022 August 4, 2022	Phil (Note: This tribe member won a trip to the Outpost by being the last tribe member standing from their tribe in the Immunity Challenge.)	Masu	Phil	Palesa	9th voted out Day 19
11 12	"Spanners in the Works Guess What, You Are a Number!"	August 3, 2022 August 4, 2022	Toni	Masu	Toni	Palesa	9th voted out Day 19
13	"Work for It"	August 8, 2022	Merge; Feast; Challenge	Phil		Toni	10th voted out 1st jury member Day 21
14	"A Steady Ship"	August 9, 2022	Meryl [Dino, Phil, Steffi]		Meryl	Danté	11th voted out 2nd jury member Day 23
15	"High Risk, High Reward"	August 10, 2022	Dino [Meryl, Phil, Steffi]		Marian	Steffi	12th voted out 3rd jury member Day 25
16	"Dipping into the Dark Side"	August 11, 2022	None	~~Marian~~; Shane (Note: At Tribal Council, Marian chose to give her immunity to Shane.)		Meryl	13th voted out 4th jury member Day 27
17 18	"Balance of Power" "Goat Mode"	August 15, 2022 August 16, 2022	Phil [Tejan] (Note: Tejan used a Reward Token to join Phil on the Reward.)	Phil		Tejan	14th voted out 5th jury member Day 30
19 20	"A Whole Lot of B.S." "Our Little Alliance"	August 17, 2022 August 18, 2022	Felix, Phil	Phil	Dino (Note: This tribe member won a trip to the Outpost from finding a Save the Date advantage at the Merge Feast Challenge on Day 20.)	Felix	15th voted out 6th jury member Day 33
21	"A Game of Fluidity"	August 22, 2022	Phil [Marian]			Killarney	16th voted out 7th jury member Day 35
22	"No Tools In My Toolkit"	August 23, 2022	Marian, Shane	Shane		Phil	17th voted out 8th jury member Day 37
23	"Peace. Calm. Confidence."	August 24, 2022	None	Dino	Dino, Shane	Marian	18th voted out 9th jury member Day 38
24	"Head vs. Heart" and Return of the Outcast Reunion	August 25, 2022				Jury vote	
24	"Head vs. Heart" and Return of the Outcast Reunion	August 25, 2022				Shane	Runner-up; Day 39
24	"Head vs. Heart" and Return of the Outcast Reunion	August 25, 2022				Dino	Sole Survivor; Day 39

In the case of multiple tribes or castaways who win reward or immunity, they are listed in order of finish, or alphabetically where it was a team effort; where one castaway won and invited others, the invitees are in brackets.

== Episodes ==
No. overall	No. in season	Title	Timeline	Original release date
Week 1
124	1	"Twice the Game"	Day 1-2	July 18, 2022
Twenty returning Survivor South Africa Castaways arrived for redemption in the Sunshine Coast in the Eastern Cape. Nico informed the newly dubbed "Outcasts" that they were playing for R2 Million, the series' highest prize offer, and were divided into tribes by their previous placements. The red Yontau (Pre-Merge castaways) squared off in the first reward challenge of the season against the blue Masu (Post-Merge castaways).: Reward Challenge: In pairs, each tribe must race into the water to retrieve a ring and reach their tribe's post to score a point. The first tribe to score 3 points wins flint for their camp. Previously played in Island of Secrets.; Despite worries about her ACL injury, Steffi helped Masu dominate the reward challenge for flint. Arriving at their new camp, Masu saw old alliances uniting, with Marian and Meryl bringing together their old allies (Shane and Danté) to form the Breakfast Club with real life friends, Steffi and Chappies, to form a majority. An old fling between Marian and PK led to an awkward conversation between the two as the tribe started to socialize after the reward challenge. Toni and PK were especially concerned that a majority was forming against the Season Six players, with Toni willing to let PK draw a target on himself instead of her. Over at Yontau, the reality of having scarcer resources hit the tribe hard. However, Seamus, Dino, and Tevin found the positive of returning again to play on a tribe with less interpersonal histories among themselves. Seamus sought to redeem himself from being the first boot in the Philippines, while Tevin wanted to placate his threat level and friendships with Toni and PK over at Masu. Tania, also wanting to right the wrongs in her past, tried to take things slowly before quickly finding herself bonding with the majority of the Yontau women. Thoriso spotted carvings matching their tribe's symbol hidden in the camp, hoping it would lead to a hidden immunity idol. Pinty tried to not butt heads with Shona over a pineapple the tribe found, knowing that her frustrations with people was her mistake beforehand.: The Outpost: Two Outcasts from each tribe must be sent to the Outpost to negotiate for supplies before given a dilemma. Each tribe can negotiate and select two items each from the Outpost.; Day 2 saw the tribes volunteer two Outcasts to meet at the Outpost, where Shane and Steffi for Masu, and Seamus and Thoriso for Yontau negotiated for two pieces of supplies each for their tribes before being provided with a dilemma. The four of them were informed that they had to vote for someone besides the four of them to receive the Outpost Idol. The Outpost Idol would be used at the first Tribal Council, and could be assigned to any Outcast, even if their tribe wins the first immunity challenge. The votes cast in secret would be revealed at the challenge. If there is a tie, a rock draw for the idol will take place, with the winner receiving the idol to use at Tribal Council.
125	2	"Survivor 101"	Day 2-3	July 19, 2022
At the Outpost, Shane and Steffi urged Seamus and Thoriso to vote for Tejan, someone on the outs in Masu. However, Seamus decided that the two of them remain quiet of their own votes despite Thoriso wanting to gain favour with the others. Returning to their tribes, all four of them revealed the Outpost Idol and vote, but Shane and Steffi chose not to reveal that they offered Tejan to Yontau. That night, Palesa was woken up by Danté, to show that Chappies and Steffi were digging near the shelter looking for an idol. Danté warned the rest of the Season Sixers that Chappies was working the game at night.: Immunity Challenge: Both tribes traversed an obstacle course, breaking through a Wall of Reeds, before releasing a puzzle to solve a staircase puzzle over a ramp. Once the first puzzle is solved, the tribes can choose to either unlock 5 padlocks or untie knots to release two ladders. With their ladders freed, they must get over a bridge obstacle and a ladder puzzle before reaching their final platform. The first tribe to reach the final platform and light a fire in their wok wins immunity.; The Outpost vote revealed that Seamus and Thoriso chose to force a tie and voted for Tevin. Shane and Steffi voted for Tania in an attempt to disrupt Yontau if they lost immunity. However, the rock draw saw Tevin win the Outpost Idol. On top of that, Yontau took the lead in the immunity challenge early and won, sending the post-mergers to the first Tribal Council. Returning to Yontau, the tribe suggested to Tevin to use the idol on Palesa, but Felix pulled him aside to vouch for Danté's loyal character. Masu were devastated by the loss, having to vote someone out earlier than they anticipated. However, Danté gathered the Season Sixers, Meryl, Marian, and Tejan to plan a Chappies' blindside, which made Meryl concerned for the Breakfast Club. In case Chappies found an idol the night before, Marian offered Shane as the split vote despite her own loyalties to him. However, a paranoid Shane started to feel that Danté was flipping on the Breakfast Club, so he tried to flipped the vote onto Danté right before Tribal Council. At Tribal Council with Tevin watching in the outliers, the Masu tribe spoke about the struggle between establishing tribal unity and playing a fast paced game. Tejan brought up that Tevin is paying attention to the divisions being brought up. Before the Vote, Nico explained that Tevin will write the name of the Outcast he is saving with the idol and place it in the voting urn, and that he could ask a question to Masu. Tevin took the opportunity ask why Shane and Steffi pushed for Yontau to give the idol to Tejan, leading to an argument about trust between Steffi and Toni. Palesa interjected that Masu is letting slip too much information to Tevin and that they should go to the vote. After the vote, Tevin left Tribal Council, having granted Palesa immunity with the Outpost Idol. Despite the paranoia and arguments just prior, the majority of Masu followed their original plan to split their votes between Shane and Chappies, sending a blindsided Chappies home for overplaying too early.
126	3	"The Ghost of Your Past Game"	Day 4-5	July 20, 2022
The Chappies blindside left Steffi and Shane uncomfortable in their place in the Breakfast Club, with Marian having to reassure Shane that he's safe in the alliance. Palesa was aware that Tevin giving her immunity at Tribal Council could make the perception of the Season Sixers acting as a quad more of a threat even though she felt in the majority of Masu. PK likewise felt comfortable in a seven strong alliance that excluded Shane and Steffi. At Yontau, Tania started to regret aligning with Pinty, as Pinty's food intake became too much compared to the rest of the tribe, leading to an argument at night between the two reminiscent of Tania's clash with Felix in Island of Secrets. Thoriso's idol search took a turn when she accidentally said to Tania and Killarney that she thought Tevin had found it, when in actuality it hadn't been found. Word got back to Tevin about the rumour and he confronted the tribe after the immunity challenge about it. Tania took the blame for Thoriso's blunder, and it led to the tribe searching under the shelter together for the idol. Seamus dug it up and discovered that it would be void after the third Tribal Council, so he kept it to himself to make sure it wouldn't be used as he wanted to have found it privately instead.: Reward/Immunity Challenge: Starting from the rivershore, one tribe member at a time must swim out with a lifesaver to retrieve 5 fish traps, while the rest of the tribe would unspool a line to be able to pull them back to shore. Once all five fish traps are recovered, they can be opened for one tribe member to retrieve the balls inside of them, which they would throw onto a tiered wooden rack above ground. The first tribe to land all 10 balls on their wooden rack wins fishing and foraging gear and immunity.; Masu took the loss of the immunity challenge hard, with Steffi blaming egos like PK's getting in the way of tribal unity in challenges. Toni tried to rally the tribe to vote out Marian, using Marian's vitiligo as a reason to keep the tribe strong for challenges. Marian overheard the talk about her skin which led to an emotional breakdown on Day 5, as she had been struggling with her skin and the weather conditions due to her disability and Toni's talk triggered her. Steffi reached out to comfort her ally. With PK and Toni thinking they were in control of the vote, Danté returned to the Breakfast Club to eliminate PK over Toni, despite the women wanting to get rid of Toni. Before Tribal Council, Marian, accompanied by Steffi, found a Diplomatic Immunity Idol, where if after a future immunity challenge pre-merge, Marian could elect herself or someone of her choosing to permanently swap tribes to avoid that upcoming Tribal Council. At Tribal Council, Steffi blamed the faults in the tribe in the clashing of egos among the Outcasts instead of seeking unity, with Shane agreeing. When Nico inquired how Masu were dealing with the past relationships made pre-season in the game, Toni and PK both expressed frustration about the tribe talking about their Mindanao tattoos and how it prevented them from playing a new game because of it. When asked about security in the game, Marian brought up that the tribe barely spoke with her throughout the day, which led to an argument between Toni and Marian about each other's social game. Meryl brought up that there weren't many private conversations before Tribal Council that she was aware of. With everyone thinking that they were in the majority for the vote, it was revealed that the Breakfast Club were united in blindsiding former Philippines players and voted out PK, leaving a distraught Toni in tears.
127	4	"Walking on Eggshells"	Day 6-7	July 21, 2022
The fallout of PK's vote saw Toni arguing with Danté, which overflowed to the morning where she had to leave the shelter due to Danté continuing to raise his voice at her, upsetting her further. Toni wished to be swapped from the tribe as soon as possible to get away from him. Meanwhile, Marian, Meryl, and Steffi solidified themselves as the Full Package trio within the Breakfast Club alliance. At Yontau, while the tribe took to sleeping around the fire instead of their shelter, Dino passed out on top of the fire in the middle of the night, getting second degree burns on both his hands. Medical attended to his hands in the morning and cleared him to continue the game.: Reward/Immunity Challenge: Electing two tribe members to hoist up a pair of nets, the remainder of the tribes must rush to fill the opposing tribe's nets with sandbags to cause them to drop to the ground. The tribe that manages to get the opposing tribe to drop both of their nets first wins a trip to a breakfast bar reward and immunity.; On reward, Masu as a whole spent some time searching for an idol or an idol clue, greatly appreciating the food reward as well. Both Seamus and Dino worried that Yontau's alliances hadn't fully formed yet, so the tribe were undecided on who to vote out. Phil and Felix, while skeptical of Seamus' sociable status in the tribe, agreed that either Pinty or Tania needed to be voted out for the sake of keeping Yontau unified. Tevin approached Tania, willing to keep her around if she patched things up with Pinty or pitched a means to get rid of her properly, however it led to Tania arguing with Pinty about hogging the fire last night that led to her sleeping in the cold. The scrambling over the next day before Tribal Council saw Tania alienating herself from the women she allied with, while Shona privately made herself a fake immunity idol to plant at Tribal Council for future protection. At Tribal Council, the tribe felt disappointed that one of them was about to remain a pre-merge boot in Survivor SA, but felt that the tribe needed to vote to keep the tribe unified against Masu. Tevin brought up that Seamus was in possession of the tribe's idol and should proudly wear it to keep him safe for the first vote, while Dino named Tania as someone disrupting the unity in camp. In response, Tania tried to rally the tribe to step up and speak about their grievances about Pinty, but the tribe kept silent. Before the vote was revealed, Seamus used the idol on himself to send it back into the game. Meanwhile, Tania's scrambling to pitch Pinty over her had failed, with Yontau unanimously voting her out of the game.
Week 2
128	5	"The Rope Dealer"	Day 8-9	July 25, 2022
While the tribe agreed that Pinty should be voted out next, Phil and Thoriso both wanted to break up the duo forming between Seamus and Tevin as soon as possible. Over at Masu, Toni tried to patch things up with Marian after inappropriately using Marian's skin condition against her in the game, aware that flipping to the pre-mergers would be sabotage in the future. Palesa tried to reconnect with Danté after the PK vote, but she felt that his ego was getting too much to handle as the current alpha male of the tribe.: Reward/Immunity Challenge: In one vs. one rounds, each tribe must race through a narrow river gauntlet to reach the opposing end to pull a rope trigger for their tribe. While alternating from different ends of the gauntlet for fairness, the first tribe to win 5 bouts earns a hammock, camp cushions and pillows, a mini braai bread bundle with a grid, and immunity.; Masu utterly dominated the challenge, which saw Killarney disorientated by Palesa's pace after their round together. Tevin thought that it would have looked like Yontau was throwing the challenge, but knew it wasn't the case. After the reward meal, Steffi decided to look around for an idol and found one at the base of Masu's tribe, with Tevin finding Yontau's idol right underneath Felix's nose. With an idol in his pocket, Tevin worked with Seamus to rally the tribe together to vote out Pinty, despite the Yontau men worrying about the easy vote delaying everyone's strategic game. While Pinty wanted to target Killarney for her performance in the challenge, Thoriso gravitated around the idea of taking out Tevin instead, given how strong his social game has been around camp. Not wanting to lead the charge, she waited until Phil approached her with the same idea, letting him pull in Dino and Felix to the plan. While organizing the blindside, Phil encouraged Pinty to continue scrambling and targeting Killarney at Tribal Council to make sure Tevin and Seamus were unaware of the plan. Phil's plan worked as at Tribal Council, Pinty continued to stir up animosity, urging Yontau to vote Killarney out instead of her. This left an unsuspecting Tevin to be blindsided, idol in hand, and a dumbfounded Seamus being reassured by Dino.
129	6	"Sharp Tools"	Day 10-11	July 26, 2022
Tevin's blindside left Seamus rattled about his position in Yontau, blaming the vote on Dino. At Masu, Danté started chopping off the symbols around camp in the event of a tribe swap, with Toni wary of his alpha male status around camp.: Reward Challenge: With one tribe member inside a wooden cart, four others must use pulleys to hoist the cart off ground to reach its 4 wheels. When all 4 wheels are released and the cart safely placed on the ground, the rider must assemble the cart for it to traverse over a bridge to a sand pit. At the sand pit, the three remaining tribe members must dig up 10 planks needed to fix the second bridge the cart needs to travel over. At the end of the challenge, one tribe member must use the 4 wheels of the cart as part of a lighthouse puzzle. The first tribe to complete their lighthouse puzzle wins a spin on a Rewards Wheel, giving the tribe different food rewards or an advantage for the next immunity challenge.; Yontau took the lead, with Dino finishing the puzzle with ease. With a spin of the Reward Wheel, Yontau won a bag of lentils, and after given an option to select two members of Masu to spin and join the tribe on reward, they chose Tejan and Toni, who successfully won Yontau a meal of Mac and Cheese to share. While on reward, Toni revealed that Danté was successfully eliminating dominant men on Masu to take control at the merge, to the disappointment of Tejan. He reported back to Shane after the reward of Toni's loose lips, worried that her emotional gameplay will tank his own in the future. Meanwhile, Steffi revealed to Marian alone that she had found the Masu idol, solidifying the two within the Full Package and Breakfast Club alliances.: Immunity Challenge: Three tribe members start the challenge solving a rope peg maze to unravel a key above them. The key opens a gate which leads to a ramp gauntlet the entire tribe must traverse without touching the ground to reach a sliding tile puzzle. The tribe must move the sliding table to hang three sets of tiles on a platform, with one tribe member on the platform to raise the tiles off the ground. The first tribe to spell, "Outwit. Outplay. Outlast." wins immunity.; Despite Masu's constant yelling among themselves, and Dino's puzzle prowess helping Yontau to catch up, Masu managed to win immunity. Amidst Yontau's scrambling, Shona revealed to Phil and Dino that Seamus wanted to target Dino. Seamus tried to rally the women against Dino in an attempt to emulate Danté's strategy of getting rid of strong men before the merge. However, the women disagreed with Seamus' plans, and the tribe unified together to blindside Seamus at Tribal Council. Despite Dino feeling secure in his social game, as the rest of Yontau worked together to defend him, he and Phil arranged for a vote on Killarney for safety in case Seamus had an idol. However, the worry of an idol being used was for nothing, as Seamus didn't pick up a fake idol he also planted at Tribal Council to bluff his way to safety, ultimately leading to his elimination.
130	7	"Expect the Unexpected"	Day 12-13	July 27, 2022
Pinty annoyed the rest of Yontau by celebrating Seamus' ouster at camp the next morning, despite Dino knowing that it was Shona who informed the tribe about Seamus' plans. In the lead up to a potential tribe swap, Toni tried to convince Tejan and Palesa that they should try and work on flipping Steffi against Danté if they have the chance. Gathering in front of Nico on Day 12, the two tribes swapped by randomly picking a red or blue vial of water. Shona, however, picked a yellow vial, which allowed her to pick whichever tribe she wanted. Despite her allies, Dino and Phil, outnumbered against original Masu members, Shona chose to stick with Yontau, to the bafflement of Meryl. The swap breathed new life into Toni's game, far from Danté and the Breakfast Club, where now she could work with the original Yontau members if possible. Steffi and Pinty both felt vulnerable with the Yontau majority at the new Masu tribe.: The Outpost: One tribe member of the newly swapped tribes must each go to the Outpost to negotiate for reward items for their tribes.; Danté volunteered to go for Yontau, muscling in as the leader of the Masu majority on the tribe, while Tejan was selected by Masu, with Toni arranging it to avoid sending Steffi to the Outpost where she could find an advantage. At the Outpost, the two men traded items, while sharing fruit juice and cookies, before Danté urged Tejan to reach out to Felix, his former tribemate in Island of Secrets, for an alliance. Inside rice bags for each of their tribes were clues to a hidden immunity idol at their respective camps. Returning to camp, Danté aroused suspicion from Dino about having found an advantage, though he managed to find the idol, with the caveat that he needed to trade it to someone on Masu and hopefully receive the new Yontau idol from Masu in return. Knowing that original Yontau was on the outs, Phil tried to reconnect with Marian, as they each played on Champions but not together, while Shona tried to bring a peaceful decorum around camp. Leading up to the next challenge, Marian had decided that if Yontau won immunity, she would use her Diplomatic Immunity to save Steffi, bringing her onto Yontau and keeping her ally in the game.: Reward/Immunity Challenge: Three tribe members at a time would compete in 3 rounds, where Nico releases two large wooden balls down a ramp and into a mud pit. Both tribes must try to push one of the wooden balls into their respective goals to earn a point. The first tribe to score two points wins a bunny chow meal and immunity.; The first round of the challenge lasted over an hour. During the round, Danté lied to Tejan about not finding the idol, when Tejan revealed he hadn't found one on Masu. Steffi slipped and aggravated her ACL injury, forcing the medical team to remove her from the challenge. Nico declared that since the round had lasted for over an hour and Masu were one person short to compete, the round was declared a stalemate and that the next round with new players would decide the challenge. An all-women's bout of Yontau's Palesa, Meryl, and Shona fought against Masu's Pinty, Toni, and Killarney. With the Outcasts getting rough in the challenge, Nico halted the round after a body slam back to the ground onto Shona's chest by Pinty had left her unable to breathe in pain.
131	8	"This is Gonna Be a Life Long Torture"	Day 13-14	July 28, 2022
The medical team extracted Shona from the challenge to examine her further. Nico declared a restart for the sudden death round, with Shane stepping in for Yontau and Felix replacing Killarney for Masu. With Nico releasing an additional two wooden balls into the mud pit, another hour passed in the challenge before Toni managed to score the winning point for Masu. Both tribes were emotionally drained after the challenge, with Meryl and Marian in tears after everything that had happened. Returning to their bunny chow reward, Tejan and Toni found themselves in the middle of splitting factions of the old Yontau tribe. Thoriso and Felix offered to get rid of Killarney to work with the original Masu outsiders at the merge, while Killarney approached them and Steffi and proposed to get rid of Pinty when they have the chance. Over at Yontau, the Breakfast Club were unsure of what move to make against the original Yontau. Danté was adamant that they take out Dino, as his puzzle prowess intimidated his plans at the merge, while Meryl and Marian wanted to vote out the sociable Shona, if she was cleared by medical to return to the game. Trying to find any sort of advantage to protect himself, Dino went exploring the beaches and found himself a hidden immunity idol, informing Phil of his plan of flipping Palesa against Danté if possible. Nico arrived at the Yontau camp to give an update on Shona, where medical was concerned she might have cracked her rib from the incident at the challenge. However, she was cleared fit to return and that Tribal Council would be delayed to Day 14 to let Yontau rest after such a taxing day. Her return to camp was met with open arms by everyone, allowing Dino and Phil to try and find a crack in the original Masu majority. Over Day 14, Danté grew more frustrated with his alliance, as they were adamant about voting Shona out over Dino, while the "No BS" alliance of Dino, Phil and Shona managed to convince Palesa to flip. Knowing the majority were going to split votes between Dino and Shona, Dino revealed he had the idol to Palesa, promising to place votes on Danté if she voted for Dino instead of Shona. At Tribal Council, Palesa followed the plan set up by Dino, changing her vote so that Dino could eliminate a majority using his idol. However, at the last minute, Phil panicked and cast his vote against Shona, sending her home instead of a furiously blindsided Danté.
Week 3
132	9	"A Flat Out No"	Day 15	August 1, 2022
Phil owned up to messing up the plan, leaving Palesa unsure if she should work with the Yontau duo. However, Danté's frustrations with the Breakfast Club left Palesa as someone he was willing to continue working with. Meanwhile, Meryl and Marian started to question whether it was worth still working with Danté given his explosive response to the vote at Tribal Council. At Masu, Tejan shared the idol clue he received at the Outpost to Toni in the hopes to solidify themselves as a duo.: Reward/Immunity Challenge: Starting in the middle of a maze, 1 tribe member designated as a caller must navigate their blindfolded tribe to retrieve 6 bags of puzzle pieces. Once all 6 bags have been found and placed on their tribe's puzzle station on the outer side of the maze, the caller may attempt to unscramble a four word puzzle. The first tribe to solve their word puzzle wins a food shop reward and immunity.; During the challenge, Dino whispered to Thoriso that he was going home if Yontau lost, but the tribe banded together to yell over Thoriso's instructions, leading Masu to fall behind while Dino was working on the word puzzle. The tactic worked as it gave Dino enough time to win the challenge for Yontau and save himself for a few days. At the reward, Meryl was chosen first to enter the food shop for a 3-minute all-you-can-eat round, where she found a Tribal Council Pass hidden inside a cake with the tribe symbols on it. After the challenge loss, Steffi vented her frustrations about the food rations with Pinty, while Toni and Tejan found themselves safely in the middle of two factions. The former Yontau wanted to take out Killarney before the merge, while the former Masu wanted to get rid of Pinty before solidifying new alliance lines with Killarney. Felix and Thoriso pitched to Tejan as to why Killarney should leave, while Pinty suggested that Steffi was the bigger social threat come merge. Thoriso shot down that idea, as she was aiming to get rid of potential goats before the merge. With both sides of the new Masu tribe thinking that Toni and Tejan were with them, the former Yontau found themselves blindsided with the new Masu majority choosing immediate unity over the potential future, sending a stunned Pinty home.
133	10	"The Don"	Day 16-17	August 2, 2022
After leaving Felix and Thoriso on the bottom of new Masu, Tejan, at Toni's insistence, found the Idol hidden near the tribe's water well. When finding out that it would only work for someone at Yontau, they decided to try and sneak it across to Dino. While at Yontau, Shane started trying to court Dino and Phil to prepare a blindside against Danté.: Reward/Immunity Challenge: One at a time, a tribe member must chop through three segments of rope to release a wrecking ball. Once released, the tribe must roll the ball through a netted obstacle and pull over a giant rope climb ramp. Lastly, they must attach the wrecking ball to a swing in order to target 4 tiles to break. The first tribe to break all 4 tiles and then release their tribe flag wins a pizza and beer feast reward and Immunity.; Marian sat out for Yontau, using the challenge to search for an advantage on the sitout bench, while Thoriso's struggle over the ramp saw Masu lose their lead against Yontau that they couldn't recover. After the challenge, Toni managed to reach out to Dino to hand him the Yontau idol, however both Shane and Palesa caught the exchange. With a new Idol in hand, Dino and Phil considered either using it to take out Danté or Shane the next time they head back to Tribal Council, unknowing that Marian and Meryl also want to get rid of Danté sooner than later. After the challenge loss, Felix and Thoriso felt vulnerable to the whims of Toni and Tejan, with the new Masu majority pitching to get rid of Thoriso, who has allies over on Yontau, while the outsiders advocated for Killarney, who didn't have much social capital in the game. In fear of a potential idol, Steffi and Toni suggested a split vote, using the revote to eliminate Thoriso. However, Tejan revealed the plan to the outsiders. With the split vote information, Thoriso considered throwing a vote onto Felix to save herself. At Tribal Council, Felix pointed out the majority 4 in the new Masu had all the power, feeling compelled to campaign for himself to stay. Even though given the opportunity to sacrifice Felix for her own game, Thoriso stuck with her ally to force the tie vote between the two of them and Killarney, with the original Masu players unifying to send Thoriso home.
134	11	"Spanners in the Works"	Day 18	August 3, 2022
Despite feeling betrayed by Tejan and Toni, Felix didn't want to let revenge take over his game due to losing Thoriso at the last Tribal Council. Toni continued to cement her control over the new Masu, aware of the many connections she's forming across tribal lines since the swap. On Yontau, Phil's main goal was to find a means to protect himself until the merge, as his ally Dino only had one idol in his possession. Danté started using the inactive Masu idol he had to bluff to the Breakfast Club that he was assured of getting to merge.: Reward/Immunity Challenge: Perched upon poles in the river, each tribe member must stand for as long as possible while holding a ball above their hairline. The last tribe member from each tribe to remain on their pole with their ball above their heads won a trip to the Outpost, with the tribe with the last member standing overall winning immunity.; Before the challenge began, Nico stated that both tribes would attend the next Tribal Council together, with the winning tribe joining in voting someone out of the losing tribe. Early in the challenge, Danté and Felix fell out of the challenge, where the former Island of Secrets ally discouraged Felix with trusting Tejan and Toni. When Marian lost the challenge, she contemplated using her Diplomatic Immunity at the end of the challenge, as it was appearing that Yontau were going to lose overall, but Danté disagreed with the idea. Eventually, Phil managed to outlast all of Yontau to win a trip to the Outpost, but decided to give immunity to Masu at Toni's insistence of his safety. To decide who from Masu would join Phil, Toni convinced Tejan and Steffi to drop out as they had both previously been to the Outpost, and she wanted to get Phil on board with Masu's plans. The two jumped off their poles shortly afterwards to the shock of the two tribes, giving Toni the win. Before Nico could dismiss the tribes, Marian decided to trust herself and handed over her Diplomatic Immunity advantage to swap from Yontau to Masu, making herself immune along with the 5 new Masu tribe members. The joined Tribal Twist left Yontau scrambling to make a plan, given that Toni appeared to be running the new Masu tribe. However, with the Breakfast Club split between the two tribes, they tried to figure out who on the outs could be their target. Marian received a cold reception from everyone at Masu aside from Steffi. Felix felt divided between siding with his No BS alliance with Phil and Dino, and falling back with old Ta'alo allies Danté and Meryl for the vote. Steffi was concerned about having her number one ally in Marian derailing her own individual game she's been playing separate from the rest of the Breakfast Club alliance.: The Outpost: Both tribe members attending the Outpost must decide on a name of who they predict will be voted out at the upcoming Tribal Council. If they are correct, each will receive half of a split immunity idol.; As soon as the two read out the Outpost twist, Toni and Phil decided to try and rally their numbers to split votes between Shane and Meryl, given the information of Danté possibly having an idol in his possession intimidated the two. The two finally decided on the plan to force a tie between Shane and Meryl, voting out Shane on the revote. However, that afternoon after the immunity challenge, Shane discovered an advantage hidden in the dunes above Yontau's camp.
135	12	"Guess What, You Are a Number!"	Day 18-19	August 4, 2022
The hopes of finding safety for himself vanished when Shane unraveled the advantage and discovered it was Yontau's hidden Diplomatic Immunity advantage, the very same advantage that Marian had just used hours earlier to switch tribes. Knowing that the advantage was useless to him, Shane sought to use the pouch it came in to bluff to the rest of Yontau that he too held an idol. The potential of Phil finding an idol at the Outpost made Meryl nervous, as the potential options for the vote dwindled with every idol found. She didn't want to use her Tribal Council Pass advantage too soon, so she started pushing for the vote to go on Palesa, who was most likely to flip either on the Breakfast Club, or become an ally for Danté as he kept alienating himself from the rest of the women. When Phil returned from the Outpost, he created a lie that himself and Toni had to secretly vote for someone, and if they agreed, their target would have an extra vote against them at Tribal Council, implying that Shane would receive a vote against his name. Toni repeated the same lie to Masu upon her return, trying to get the entire tribe to split votes on Meryl and Shane. However, her leadership had started to rub Steffi and Killarney the wrong way, wanting to make their own decisions than following Toni's orders. With Marian on Masu now, Steffi suggested to Killarney to align with Marian and Shane (the very same people that blindsided her in Champions) come merge, as it would not be suspected by the rest of the game. Day 19 at Yontau saw the tribe scrambling, with Palesa wanting to side with the Yontau outsiders and her original ally, Toni, in the vote. Meryl pushed the Breakfast Club to target Palesa over Danté's preferred choice, Phil. Over at Masu, Toni's plan frustrated the tribe, as the majority of them didn't trust Phil outside of Felix. At Tribal Council, Nico initiated discussions about how everyone's relationships pre-game and in-game have changed, with Phil bringing up that he didn't have any pre-game relationships compared to others. However, the two tribes tried to whisper plans to each other while Nico was chatting to others. Eventually, Nico allowed the Tribal Council to go live and let the two tribes discuss, with Meryl reaching out to as many people as she could to inform them that Yontau were targeting Palesa. Dino and Phil were concerned by the sudden plan changes, but Felix reassured them that all they needed to do was survive the vote. However, when the Palesa plans reached Tejan, he grew irritated by the sudden change of plans by the original Masu tribe members. Even after expressing his frustrations to Nico once the discussions died down, Tejan begrudgingly went along with Meryl's suggestions with the majority of the two tribes, and voted out Palesa for being a social threat without the protection of an advantage in her possession. After Palesa's vote-out, both Shane and Danté revealed that they were bluffing with their invalid idols and Diplomatic Immunities, before Nico congratulated the surviving tribe members with yellow buffs signifying the final 11 had made it to the merge tribe, Salan.
Week 4
136	13	"Work for It"	Day 19-21	August 8, 2022
The new Salan tribe celebrated after Tribal Council at the upgraded former Yontau camp, with Marian noticing how quickly Danté and Felix reached out to each other, being friends outside of the game. The tribe was provided breakfast meals the morning after the merge rather than the typical merge feast.: Reward Challenge: Tribe members are each given a slingshot and a bowl of marbles, having to break through two plates. Once someone has broken the symbols on their two plates, they can select one of the plates on offer at the merge feast buffet, first come, first serve, with no sharing allowed. Rewards range from full breakfast meals, to advantages, and a bowl of rice or a single boiled egg on offer.; Felix managed to complete the challenge first and went for food, while Steffi found herself with a large bowl of bland rice. Throughout the challenge, two advantages were handed out; Dino found himself a Save the Date advantage, a note which allowed whoever holds it to go to the Outpost on Day 32. Meryl received a Reward Send token, which allows her to go on a reward once in the game if she'd like to, which is valid until the Final 6. Shane helped Marian complete the challenge as she struggled, until Meryl, Killarney, and Toni were left shooting at their plates until others rejoined the challenge to help the women receive their reward. Phil had picked a mystery plate that contained spices for the tribe and a key, which Nico informed unlocks a chest back at Salan's camp for everyone to share. Returning to camp, the chest turned out to be a cooler box full of beers for the tribe to continue celebrating the merge. However, the tribe started to strategize for the upcoming merge vote, as the near-unanimous vote of Palesa had left alliance lines undrawn in the eyes of Toni and the No B.S. alliance. Felix himself felt undecided between remaining loyal to the No B.S. alliance, or move forward with his old Ta'alo allies, Danté and Meryl from Island of Secrets. Steffi felt that the Toni she dealt with post-swap was someone she wanted to work with, despite being in the Breakfast Club and her Day 1, Full Package trio.: Immunity Challenge: Standing on a tilted platform, each tribe member must hold onto a knotted rope above their heads for as long as possible over the river. At regular intervals, they must move on to hold onto ropes leaning out over the river in increasing difficulty. The last tribe member to remain holding onto their rope with both hands wins immunity.; Phil outlasted Steffi and Tejan to win immunity, to the surprise of him and the rest of Salan, leaving him safe to navigate his first ever merge vote. While the alliances started to scramble for the vote, Toni kept assuring Dino that her new Masu allies, Steffi and Killarney, would still be able to vote Danté out. However, Dino noted that the fact the Meryl/Shane plans at the previous Tribal Council fell apart for Toni, and that he and the No B.S. alliance should look to make inroads with the socially secure Steffi instead. Suspecting that he or Toni could be a target, Tejan went looking for an idol and found the new Salan idol above near the water well, hoping to keep it safe for a while longer. Meanwhile, the Breakfast Club started to reach out to the original Yontau members in splitting votes between Toni and Tejan, as Shane and Danté feared that they would have the biggest potential to disrupt alliances in the merge. This left the No B.S. alliance struggling to decide with who to side with. At Tribal Council, the original Yontau members all spoke about sitting back and observing how the merge players operated, with Meryl also bringing up that it was the merge vote was where she was voted out previously. The fact that alliances weren't fully drawn out of hiding made Tejan uneasy about the upcoming vote, as there were, in his opinion, a number of swing votes up in the air. However, at the vote, the No B.S. alliance decided to follow the Breakfast Club's plans, as Steffi picked her original allies to target the original Masu outsiders. Tejan ended up playing his newfound idol, blindsiding the entire tribe, but the votes revealed that the two alliances chose to send Toni to the jury instead of him. Disappointed by her allies, Toni mentioned before getting her torch snuffed that she would vote for Danté if he got to the end.
137	14	"A Steady Ship"	Day 22-23	August 9, 2022
Tejan was blindsided by the vote, which saw Steffi sticking to her original Breakfast Club and Full Package alliance over the new Masu tribe. In a means to apologize to Tejan, Meryl explained that it was because Toni kept threatening her game, while Tejan was under the belief it was Steffi leading the charge against her, not Toni. Despite finally getting his way, the Breakfast Club started to turn their sights onto Danté, as his aggressive approach with Tejan had started to alienate Shane and the rest of the alliance. Meanwhile, Danté desperately wanted the Breakfast Club to listen to his concerns about Dino.: Reward/Immunity Challenge: Starting at the bottom of a steep dune, each tribe member must run up to retrieve three keys one at a time for their respective chests. Unlocking their three chests provides them a bags of puzzle pieces for them to solve. The first tribe member to solve the puzzle wins a meal of Chinese takeout and immunity.; Meryl managed to win immunity, saving herself on the same day she was voted out on Island of Secrets, and her child's birthday. Given the option to invite 3 others to join her on reward, she chose the rest of the tribe who didn't receive a good meal at the merge feast reward (Dino, Phil and Steffi) to join her. At the reward, they were given a dilemma; the Chinese takeout reward, or blankets for the tribe. Despite their hunger, Meryl and the others chose the blankets as the tribe were freezing at night. Along with the reward, there was a jar of fortune cookies that the entire tribe had to open together, which led to Meryl winning a trip to the Outpost. However, Marian felt that Meryl's luck was granting her too much power in the game and thus started to create dissent against her ally within the tribe as the next target after Danté.: The Outpost: The castaway is given a dilemma: take the 50/50 coin advantage and lose their vote at the upcoming Tribal Council, or leave the Outpost with nothing.; At the Outpost, Meryl took the 50/50 Coin advantage willingly, as she didn't want to have to write Danté's name down at Tribal Council, despite having approached the Breakfast Club and the No B.S. alliance about flipping on him. Returning to camp, unaware that her target had grown, Meryl lied to the tribe that she lost her vote because she failed at getting the 50/50 Coin advantage. The Breakfast Club struggled to deal with the fact that they were blindsiding their friend, Danté, at the upcoming Tribal Council. At Tribal Council, Nico asked the tribe about any forming alliances controlling the game, and Tejan spoke out about how the women were in charge, leading to a four-way argument between himself, Steffi, Marian, and Meryl about him scrambling from the bottom and him accusing them of deceptive gameplay. However, Danté thought that Tejan was creating a diversion and got up to try and beg Marian to not fall for it and to vote out Dino instead. However, when the votes were cast, Danté discovered that the Breakfast Club weren't picking Tejan over Dino, but were planning his blindside all along, sending him to the jury.
138	15	"High Risk, High Reward"	Day 24-25	August 10, 2022
Tejan's outburst at Tribal Council left the Full Package trio exposed, with the Breakfast Club falling apart in order to target Steffi or Meryl for their strong social game. Killarney advocated for Steffi, while Shane and Marian wanted to get rid of Meryl.: Reward/Immunity Challenge: In a two-round challenge, each tribe member must walk down a sloped beam while spinning a ball with a wheel. The last six to still be standing with their ball still spinning progressed to the second round, with the winner receiving an advantage. In the second round, the six remaining tribe members must navigate a ball through to the end of a table maze (the advantage being one less hole for the Round 1 winner to maneuver around). The first three to finish can then attempt a wall pulley maze where the first tribe member to land three balls into the final hole above the wall maze wins a wine and tapas lunch, a Mahindra XUV300 and immunity.; Dino outlasted Phil to win the Round 2 advantage, but Tejan took the lead in the second round until he dropped a ball on the wall maze. Due to this mistake, Dino managed to overtake Tejan to win the challenge and the car. Devastated by the narrow loss, Tejan recounted for Nico about the Survivor Auction in Maldives where he bid everything he had for a mystery milkshake, where the very next item was a car that went to Alison. The loss at the challenge reminded him of that past experience. Dino was given the opportunity to bring 3 others on reward with him, while he test drove his brand new car, deciding on the same group that gave up Chinese takeout for blankets for the tribe. The remaining outcasts had to draw for a chance to visit the Outpost the next day. With Steffi, Phil, and Meryl on reward, Dino knew that the rest of the tribe would focus their attention onto Meryl, and prevent her from getting another advantage at the Outpost. Back at Salan, Marian started planted seeds of doubt against Meryl within the tribe, despite the tribe's annoyance with Tejan's Tribal Council outbursts and behaviour around camp. At the reward, Meryl tried to solidify new relationships outside of the Breakfast Club, without Danté's influence. Returning to camp, however, Steffi continued the efforts to convince the No B.S. Alliance to target Meryl with the rest of the tribe. But this left Felix wondering if Steffi wouldn't be the bigger strategic threat given how she got along with everyone in the game. Approaching Phil and Dino, Felix pitched a switch from Meryl to a Steffi blindside, surprising the duo with a solid plan. After informing Meryl of the planned blindside by the Breakfast Club, the No B.S. alliance roped in Tejan to form a majority, with Meryl offering her Reward Send token after Tribal Council if Tejan helped vote Steffi out.: The Outpost: A dilemma; rice for the tribe, or a clue to a hidden immunity idol back at camp.; Day 25 saw Marian visit the Outpost, after winning the draw after the immunity challenge. Despite her desires to have an idol in her possession, she chose rice for the tribe to reduce any threat level she had. Returning to camp, she told the tribe that she had the choice of a personal feast or rice for the tribe, and started to cry, leading Meryl to comfort her. This left Phil uncomfortable as Marian had been orchestrating a blindside against Meryl herself, and unsure about how the No B.S. alliance's plans would disrupt his own relationship he has built with Marian over the season. At Tribal Council, Nico brought up that every Salan Tribal Council has been a blindside so far, which saw Marian point out that it has left everyone having to trust their gut and relationships more because of it. With the conversations at Tribal Council circling around blindsides, Tejan still re-iterated the power the women held over the tribe. The No B.S. Alliance and Meryl managed to successfully send a stunned Steffi with her idol to the jury.
139	16	"Dipping into the Dark Side"	Day 26-27	August 11, 2022
As promised, Meryl gave Tejan her Reward Send token as a thanks for saving her at the previous Tribal Council, while her relationship with Marian appeared fractured on the floor. Marian felt disappointed in Phil for flipping against her ally, before telling the No B.S. men about all of the advantages that Meryl still held. Dino had to reassure Marian that the move against Steffi wasn't an attack on Marian's alliance, and showed trust in her by revealing his Save the Date advantage he won at the merge feast. Marian's friendship with Dino started to leave Shane concerned about his alliance with her, as he felt that besides the two of them, Dino was the biggest strategic threat left outside of Meryl. Meryl, knowing she was on the outs of the alliances now, tried to form a bond with Tejan, aware that the original Yontau men were a tight trio, compared to the fractured remains of the Breakfast Club. However, the No B.S. alliance, thanks to Marian's information, start turning their focus onto Meryl.: Immunity Challenge: Behind a locked door, each tribe member must reach through the bars to move a peg around a maze on the other side of the door. Releasing the peg would release the key for them to unlock the door. Once freed, each tribe member must then stack a 4-block tower in a way that there are no repeating colours. The first tribe member to correctly solve the block tower puzzle wins immunity.; Yet again, Tejan narrowly missed out on immunity, with Marian coming from behind the majority of Salan to solve the block tower puzzle. Energized by her first-ever individual immunity win, Marian started plotting to get rid of Meryl or Tejan, due to his close calls in immunity challenges. However, the No B.S. alliance struggled to figure out how to blindside their new ally, Meryl. While discussing about how she should use her Tribal Council Pass, Meryl thought using it on herself wouldn't benefit the alliance in taking out the remaining Breakfast Club members and suggested that she use the Pass on Marian instead, leaving a 5 to 2 numbers difference in the vote. This sparked a plan in Phil to tell Marian, to get the entire tribe onboard with the move to ouster Meryl. Despite Felix reassuring Tejan that he was safe, Tejan still went idol hunting in case he was the back-up plan yet again. However, with the pieces in play, the No B.S. alliance and Marian began their blindside against Meryl. At Tribal Council, Marian pointed out to Nico that if she hadn't received immunity, she'd have been picked off, as the Steffi blindside had left her and Meryl at odds with each other. She also pointed out how Meryl was still in the loop with the tribe's strategic talk and not her. Before leading to the vote, Meryl decided to use her Tribal Council Pass on Marian, to get rid of the advantages she had. However, before leaving Tribal Council, Marian decided to give up immunity and protect Shane. With Killarney as the only remaining Breakfast Club option, Meryl chose not to use her 50/50 coin, but the vote revealed that even the No B.S. alliance had turned on her, sending Meryl straight to the jury.
Week 5
140	17	"Balance of Power"	Day 28-29	August 15, 2022
Upon seeing Meryl was blindsided, Marian was in disbelief that the No B.S. alliance's plan worked, with Shane feeling the entire tribe felt temporarily united in the successful blindside of Meryl. Early tree mail on Day 28 alluded to a potential family visit with the upcoming reward, with the entire Salan tribe talking about missing their loved ones. However, Killarney held back from the rest of the tribe that she had lost both her mother and her partner in short succession 2 months before the season began, leaving her saddened about the prospects of having loved ones visiting her. But she chose to withhold this information as she didn't want to struggle further with her mourning while dealing with the game.: Reward Challenge: Each tribe member must traverse over a balanced rig to spell out the phrase "Return of the Outcasts" without knocking it over. The first to complete the phrase and return safely to the start of the rig would win a Chicken Schnitzel meal, a Video Call from their Loved One back at home, and an advantage in the upcoming Immunity Challenge.; Surprising everyone and himself again, Phil managed to win the reward, but was offered a dilemma. He could forgo the meal and the advantage if he chose two others to join him and receive a call from their loved ones as well. Despite him undecided between the food and the rest of the tribe, the entire tribe urged Phil to take the food instead of picking between them, even though Marian especially wanted to see her mother. After deciding to pick for himself, Tejan interjected and submitted the Reward Send token he got from Meryl to Nico, allowing himself to join Phil on the reward and receive the advantage as well. The decision irked Phil, as he was considering picking Tejan for the reward, but without allowing him to get both food and the advantage. The two discussed the growing threat that were Dino and Marian as a pair of super fans left in the game before receiving their video calls with home and their advantages. At Salan, Dino had started talking about forming a final 4 with the former Champions players excluding Killarney, as he was starting to become aware of Felix's strategic strengths after the Steffi blindside. Shane relayed information from his own discussions with Felix about a plan to blindside Dino and Marian. This left Marian wanting to target Felix in order to acquire Phil's loyalty over the No B.S. alliance.: Immunity Challenge: Standing upon a wooden structure, each tribe member must place a wooden block on their head and press it onto the top of the structure. After an interval, they cannot touch the sides of their structure to maintain their balance. The last tribe member standing with a block still on their head wins Immunity.; Phil and Tejan's advantage was that they could start the challenge five minutes after the rest of Salan had begun, which was a huge advantage as by the time the two started, Marian had already dropped out of the challenge. However, it was short lived for Tejan, who couldn't find a good spot for the block on his head and was out of the challenge within a few minutes himself. Eventually Felix and Phil were the final two remaining in the challenge.
141	18	"Goat Mode"	Day 29-30	August 16, 2022
After 17 minutes, Felix's block fell, giving Phil his second immunity challenge win of the season. The win made Marian more determined than ever to break up the duo of Felix and Phil, like she felt she had done with Danté and Felix previously. She rallied the rest of the tribe to target Felix at the upcoming vote. What complicated matters was when Felix discovered a rock with the Salan tribe's symbol on the beach while walking with Phil and Killarney, leading to Phil finding a clue to a hidden immunity idol in front of them. Phil spent the rest of the day searching for the idol along the path from the beach to the Salan camp, leaving Felix to try and pin a target on Tejan for the vote. Trust between Dino and the No B.S. alliance started to falter when he discovered Phil searching for an idol, but learned first about the clue from Killarney. Phil eventually owned up to having found a clue, which lead to Dino siding his trust more in fellow super fan, Marian. With trust between the No B.S. alliance crumbling, Felix approached Shane again with a plan to take out Dino or Tejan, but the scrambling began to paint a larger target on Felix. On Day 30, Phil rallied the trio together to try and resolve the scrambling he blamed Marian and Shane for attempting to divide the trio, but when he failed to be completely honest about how he found the clue to Dino, he started blaming Felix for the information leak. Phil then shared the clue with Dino, who believed that Phil had already found the idol. In a further attempt to reunify the trio, Phil urged the No B.S. alliance to forget the current plans and target Tejan for his challenge prowess and his social game of floating between alliances. Meanwhile, knowing he was on the outside of the tribe in general, Tejan tried to learn who the alliances were targeting, not believing Shane when he said Felix was in their sights. Not trusting the others around camp, Tejan decided to create a fake idol using a rock he found around camp as a means to bluff his way to the next day. Shortly before Tribal Council, Phil managed to find a second clue pointing to the idol being hidden under the voting urn at Tribal Council. The new majority of Marian, Shane, Dino and Killarney gravitated towards splitting their votes between Tejan and Felix in case Phil used an idol. However, at Tribal Council, the plan against Felix was turned on its head when Tejan pulled out his fake idol. Attempting to bluff his way to the next day led to Phil changing his vote, sparing Felix and sending Tejan to the jury in seventh place again after an idol bluff gone wrong, with Phil managing to score himself the idol in the voting booth.
142	19	"A Whole Lot of B.S."	Day 31-32	August 17, 2022
The vote had left Marian and Dino suspecting that Phil used Tejan's idol bluff to save Felix, with Shane angry that his and Marian's plan on splitting up the No B.S. alliance failed at the last minute. The No B.S. alliance was left in tatters after Phil saved Felix, leaving Dino feeling on the outs in the trio.: Reward Challenge: Divided into pairs, each team must throw a monkey fist knotted rope into a loop to release 20 sandbags. Once released, they must catapult their sandbags onto a net, before crawling underneath it to move their sandbags towards a trough. Finally, they must bounce their sandbags off a trampoline into 7 pockets, with the first pair to land 1 in all seven pockets winning a cocktails and lunch spa retreat with massages and an outdoor shower.; Phil's challenge dominance continued as he and Felix ended up winning the reward. Phil wanted to give up reward, since the duo leaving solidified the remaining four to plot against them back at camp. On reward, Phil urged Felix to remain loyal to the No B.S. alliance, while trying to figure out how the idol clue leaked. Felix said to him that Killarney didn't leak the info, but that left Phil in doubt of his ally, knowing in truth Killarney told Dino before he did. Meanwhile, back at Salan, Dino and Marian found that Phil left his bag back at camp and decided to search inside for any idols, finding Phil's brand new idol and rules note inside.: The Outpost: For receiving the Save the Date advantage, the recipient won a R80,000 three day trip on the Zambezi river from the Mantis Collections, and an Extra Vote which they can use on a revote, left valid until Final 5.; Dino was awestruck with his luck in winning expensive rewards, but was excited for the extra vote as it would help in the upcoming Tribal Council.
143	20	"Our Little Alliance"	Day 32-33	August 18, 2022
Returning from the Outpost with a bowl of fruit for the tribe, Dino was aware that regardless of what he said, a target would be painted on him for a presumed advantage. So he withheld the River Cruise reward he won, but that he received a video from home rather. Furthering his lie, he told Phil in private that he could practice for the immunity challenge. Still worried about getting the votes on Felix, Marian decided to implement the buddy system on Killarney, to prevent her from changing her vote at someone else's suggestion.: Immunity Challenge: Each tribe member must launch a ball onto a chute, before racing through a wooden structure to catch it before it falls. Once they have caught two balls this way, they can take their balls to a barrier which they must dig under to crawl through to a puzzle. The first tribe member to complete a 3D pyramid puzzle at the end of the challenge wins immunity.; Despite Dino and Felix leading throughout the challenge, Phil narrowly finished the puzzle before Dino. The win left Dino feeling like the biggest target, so he told the majority about his extra vote in the hopes of securing the numbers to form a tie vote. Felix started to distrust Phil since he'd always bring up Killarney as a number in their strategizing. In a last ditch effort to prevent Phil from using his idol on Felix, Marian started talking about having found an Idol Nullifier at her visit to the Outpost, while Phil himself promised to play his idol on Dino. Come Tribal Council, Dino acknowledged that the majority left in the game were original Pre-Merge boots, and that he cherished still being in the game following the merge. Phil started to acknowledge his concerns about winning immunity. Marian again threatened to play her Idol Nullifier at this vote. Meanwhile, Dino used his Extra Vote to create a tie between Felix and Killarney. Phil followed through with his word and played his idol on Dino, and Nico clarified that no Idol Nullifier was played. In the revote, the tribe unanimously decided to send Felix to the jury, having lost trust as he began to make moves in the game.
Week 6
144	21	"A Game of Fluidity"	Day 34-36	August 22, 2022
Despite both Phil and Dino electing to vote out Felix, trust between the two of them was at an all time low, with Dino adamant in taking out his ally if he didn't win immunity, as he feared that his resume was going to be diminished compared to Phil's. Tree mail arrived with individual word puzzles for the Salan tribe to search for an advantage for the upcoming immunity challenge, with Shane finding it shortly before Dino could on the beach.: Reward/Immunity Challenge: Starting on the beach, each tribe member must count a series of objects grouped together before racing to individual number combination locks. Correctly guessing the combination unlocks a baton which they can use to break a tile. An incorrect attempt at unlocking the combination forces the tribe member to run back to the counting objects before they can try again. The first tribe member to unlock their combination lock and break their tile wins a meal of hot dogs and beer, along with immunity for themselves.; Even with Shane receiving one of the numbers as his advantage, and the majority working together, Phil managed to beat out everyone again for his third consecutive immunity win. Given the opportunity to share the reward, he chose Marian to accompany him for the hot dogs, where she urged Phil to vote for Dino. Meanwhile back at camp, Dino suggested to Shane to try and ice out Phil from the vote, by letting him and Killarney think the tribe would be voting Dino, while the others unite to send Killarney to the jury. When Marian returned from reward and was updated on the plan, she suggested something more dramatic, that she would try to imitate Dino's handwriting, and claim that someone had stolen her vote, so that Phil wouldn't assume he was completely on the outs. Tribal Council came with Marian and Dino successfully executing the fake Steal a Vote plan on Phil, with Killarney blindsided out of the game and into the jury. Returning back to Salan, Dino told Phil that he stole Marian's vote to save himself, and despite the mutual distrust, the duo found themselves deciding the next morning that Marian would be the biggest threat out of the Final 4.: Reward Challenge: Divided into two pairs, each tribe member must climb up a wooden rig to place a large spool to roll down a three leveled track, and collect it before it falls off at the bottom of the rig. At intervals additional spools must be added to the tracks to increase the difficulty, with dropping a spool ending the challenge. The winning pair receives a helicopter ride to a Mantis Collection owned Game Lodge in the Eastern Cape for an overnight stay and luxurious game drive.; The challenge managed to last until the pairs (Dino-Phil and Shane-Marian) both had five spools running on their rigs. Dino contemplated throwing the challenge to prevent Phil from receiving more food for the next few days.
145	22	"No Tools In My Toolkit"	TBA	August 23, 2022
A mistake by Phil in the reward challenge led to a victory by Marian and Shane. Back at camp, Phil pitched an idea to Dino to convince Marian and Shane to split their vote in hopes that they can battle it out in the end, though Dino secretly sought to vote out Phil if he were to lose the immunity challenge.: Immunity Challenge: Against all odds, Shane won the challenge to end Phil's streak. In a last-ditch effort to stay in the game, Phil worked on convincing Marian that Dino and Shane would both betray her due to her popularity with the jury, but at Tribal Council, Marian and Shane sided with Dino to send Phil to the jury.
146	23	"Peace. Calm. Confidence."	TBA	August 24, 2022
The final three's loved ones were brought out for a reunion and to witness the final immunity challenge.: Immunity Challenge: After Dino secured himself a spot in the final two, his fiancee urged him to "do what needs to be done", meaning eliminate Marian as the bigger jury threat. Though he was saddened to do so, as he and Marian had personally bonded due to both being strong superfans of the game, he admitted to Marian that he does not see himself winning against her. At Tribal Council, he voted to face the jury with Shane, sending Marian to the jury. On the morning of day 39, Dino and Shane enjoyed the traditional breakfast and made their opening cases to the jury that night.
147	24	"Head vs. Heart"	TBA	August 25, 2022

== Voting history ==
	Week 1			Week 2			Week 3				Week 4				Week 5					Week 6
	Original Tribes					Switched Tribes				Post-Diplomatic (Note: Diplomatic Immunity is an advantage that allowed anyone possessing it or anyone of their choosing to switch tribes in the pre-merge after an Immunity Challenge. It can only be used once, and Marian used it on Day 18 to switch from Yontau to the Immune Masu tribe.)	Merged Tribe									
Episode #	2	3	4	5	6	8	9	10		12 (Note: On Day 19, both tribes attended Tribal Council to vote someone out of the tribe that lost the Immunity Challenge on Day 18.)	13	14	15	16	18	20		21	22	23
Day #	3	5	7	9	11	14	15	17		19	21	23	25	27	30	33		35	37	38
Eliminated	Chappies	PK	Tania	Tevin	Seamus	Shona	Pinty	Tie (Note: The first Tribal Council Vote resulted in a tie. Per the rules, a second vote was held where the castaways involved in the tie would not vote and the remaining castaways could only vote for those who tied.)	Thoriso	Palesa	Toni	Danté	Steffi	Meryl	Tejan	Tie	Felix	Killarney	Phil	Marian
Votes	5–4–1	5–4	9–1	5–4	6–1–1	3–2–0 (Note: Dino played a Hidden Immunity Idol on himself, therefore three votes against him were not counted.)	4–3	2–2–2	3–0–0	10–2	6–1–1–0 (Note: Tejan played a Hidden Immunity Idol on himself, therefore three votes against him were not counted.)	7–1–1	5–4	5–2	4–3	3–3–1	5–0	3–2	3–1	1–0
Voter	Vote																			
Dino			Tania	Tevin	Seamus	Danté				Palesa	~~Tejan~~	Danté	Steffi	Meryl	Felix	Killarney; Felix (Note: Dino used an Extra Vote, allowing him to cast two ballots during the first and revote after the merge.)	Felix (2x)	Killarney	Phil	Marian
Shane	Danté	PK				~~Dino~~				Palesa	Toni	Danté	Meryl	Meryl	Tejan	Killarney	Felix	Killarney	Phil	None
Marian	Chappies	PK				Shona				Palesa	Toni	Danté	Meryl	None (Note: Meryl used a Tribal Council Pass, allowing for one person to leave Tribal Council and return to camp before the vote. Meryl chose to use the pass on Marian, making her immune, yet unable to cast a vote.)	Felix	Killarney	Felix	Killarney	Phil	None
Phil			Tania	Tevin	Killarney	Shona				Palesa	~~Tejan~~	Danté	Steffi	Meryl	Tejan	Felix	Felix	Dino	Dino	
Killarney			Tania	Pinty	Seamus		Pinty	Thoriso	None (Note: Felix, Killarney and Thoriso were not eligible to vote in the second round of voting.)	Palesa	Toni	Danté	Meryl	Meryl	Tejan	Felix	None (Note: Felix and Killarney were not eligible to vote in the second round of voting.)	Dino		
Felix			Tania	Tevin	Seamus		Killarney	Killarney	None	Palesa	~~Tejan~~	Tejan	Steffi	Meryl	Tejan	Shane	None			
Tejan	Chappies	Marian					Pinty	Thoriso	Thoriso	Palesa	Danté	Danté	Steffi	Killarney	Felix					
Meryl	Chappies	PK				Shona				Palesa	Toni	None (Note: This castaway gave up their vote to earn an Advantage in the game.)	Steffi	Killarney						
Steffi	Shane	PK					Pinty	Felix	Thoriso	Palesa	Toni	Danté	Meryl							
Danté	Chappies	PK				~~Dino~~				Palesa	Toni	Dino								
Toni	Shane	Marian					Pinty	Felix	Thoriso	Meryl	Meryl									
Palesa	Chappies	Marian				~~Dino~~				Meryl										
Thoriso			Tania	Tevin	Seamus		Killarney	Killarney	None											
Pinty			Tania	Tevin	Seamus		Killarney													
Shona			Tania	Pinty	Seamus	Danté														
Seamus			Tania	Pinty	Dino															
Tevin			Tania	Pinty																
Tania			Pinty																	
PK	Shane	Marian																		
Chappies	Shane																			

Jury Vote
Episode #	24	
Day #	39	
Finalist	Dino	Shane
Votes	7–2	
Juror	Vote	
Marian	Dino	
Phil	Dino	
Killarney		Shane
Felix	Dino	
Tejan	Dino	
Meryl	Dino	
Steffi		Shane
Danté	Dino	
Toni	Dino	
