= Bonnie Mbuli =

South African actress and radio presenter (born 1979)

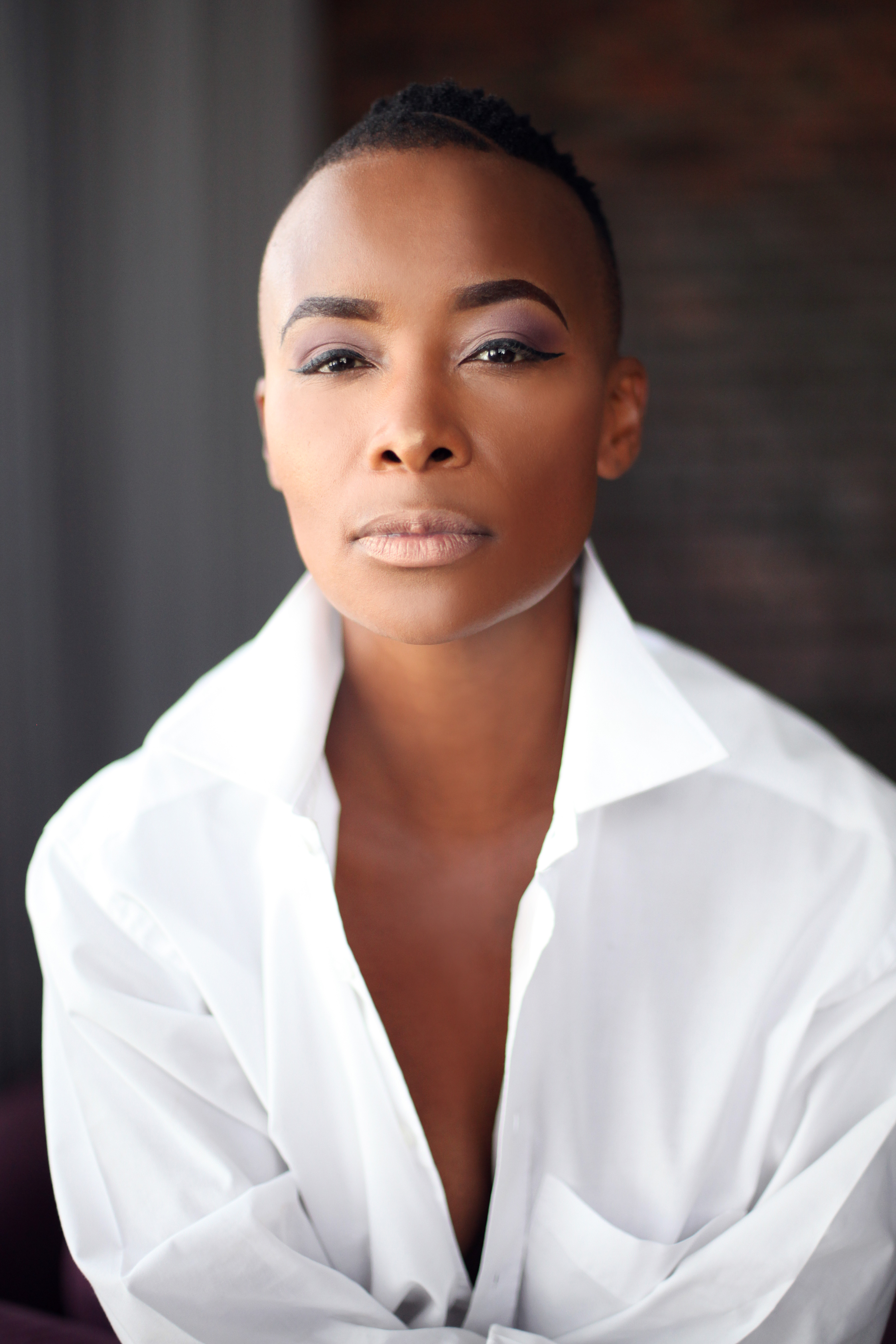
- Born: 18 March 1979 (age 47); Soweto, South Africa
- Other name: Bonnie Henna
- Occupations: Actress; television presenter; radio presenter
- Spouse: Sisanda Henna (m. 2005; div. 2013)
- Children: 2

Bonnie Mbuli (born 18 March 1979) is a South African actress, businesswoman, and television personality. She was formerly known professionally as Bonnie Henna.

She was a presenter on the SABC 3 show Afternoon Express. Since 2020, she has starred in the BBC drama series Noughts + Crosses.

== Early years ==
Mbuli was born in Soweto, South Africa, in 1979. She attended the Dominican Convent School in Belgravia, Johannesburg, and then Greenside High School in Greenside, Johannesburg. The eldest of three children, she was discovered at a bus stop on her way home from school by an actor's agent, who cast her in her first television role in the series Viva Families in 1992, when she was 13 years old.

== Career ==
This was followed with cameo roles in international productions Born Free 2 and Cave Girls. Mbuli went on to present various magazine programs for television including Teleschool, Zapmag, Technics Heart of the Beat and Limits Unlimited. In 2001, she landed a lead role in the television soap opera Backstage, which was aimed at South African youth. She was later cast in the role of Portia in Gazlam. This was followed by a role in the detective series Zero Tolerance.

Mbuli hosted a talk show in South Africa on SABC 1, True-Life, won a role in the mini-series Homecoming, and appeared in two Canadian television series: Charlie Jade, a sci-fi epic; and Scouts Safari, an adventure series set in the African wild. She completed a major role on Home Affairs, a thirteen-part series that interlinked the lives of five very different women, for Penguin Films. Mbuli went on to play lead roles in the television series Soul City and Hillside for SABC 1 and SABC 2. She was then cast in the series The Philanthropist for NBC (later also on SABC 3).

In film, she has played the role of singer Dolly Radebe, in Drum, the lead role in the Danish film Blinded Angels. In 2006, she played Precious Chamusso in Catch a Fire.

She played Zindzi Mandela in Clint Eastwood's film Invictus. She starred in E.tv's Rhythm City, on Mzansi Magic's drama series Rockville as Dudu, and on E.tv's crime investigation series Traffic. In 2015, Mbuli starred opposite Sir Kenneth Charles Branagh as policewoman Grace Mthembu in the British series Wallander. Since 2020, she has starred as Jasmine Hadley in the British series Noughts + Crosses.

She was a competitor in Survivor South Africa: Maldives, in which she finished in third place behind Hykie Berg and Lotshego Moshoeu.

== Personal life ==
Mbuli was married to actor and television personality Sisanda Henna. They had two children together, one of whom was adopted. She adopted her husband's surname. After their divorce, she authored an autobiography.

== Filmography ==
Year	Title	Role	Notes
2003-2004	Gaz'lam	Portia	13 episodes
2004	Drum	Dara Macala	
2006	Catch A Fire	Precious Chamusso	
2009	Invictus	Zindzi	
2011	Survivor South Africa: Maldives	Herself	Contestant
2014	Traffic!	Detective Lungi	
2015	Wallander	Sgt. Grace Mthembu	
2020	Barakat	Gwen	
2020	Vagrant Queen	Xevelyn	
2020–present	Noughts + Crosses	Jasmine Hadley	
2021	Family Time	Carolyn	
2024	Parish	Shamiso Tongai	

== In popular culture ==
As Bonnie Henna, she was namechecked on Chicago Med by the South African surgeon.
