= Christina Anthony =

American actress and comedian

- Born: Chicago, Illinois, U.S.
- Occupations: Actress; Comedian
- Years active: 2005–present

Christina Anthony is an American actress and comedian best known for playing Denise Johnson in Mixed-ish.

== Early life ==
Anthony was born in Chicago. She grew up in East St. Louis, Illinois. She graduated from Althoff Catholic High School in 1994. In her early career, she acted in The Second City, the ETA Creative Arts Foundation and the Black Ensemble Theater. She has remarked that some of her favorite memories of Chicago are frequenting JJ Fish and Chicken and hanging out in lounges on Stony Island Avenue.

== Career ==
Anthony's first TV role was a one off appearance in the medical drama ER before getting her first recurring role as Dr. Jolly in the comedy series Dog Moms. Anthony almost didn't get the part in Mixed-ish due to admitting her heart was not in it. She had not worked since 2011, went through a divorce and was working a customer service job while going to auditions. Since Mixed-ish has ended Anthony has appeared in The Woman in the House Across the Street from the Girl in the Window and Chicago's Party Aunt. Anthony was nominated for a Joseph Jefferson Award for Actress in a Revue for her performance in the revue, "The Absolute Best Friggin Time of Your Life," at The Second City Theatre E.T.C. in Chicago.

== Personal life ==
Anthony has been married since 2020. She currently resides in Los Angeles having moved there in 2011 to star in Jordan Peeles’s film “I Said Bitch”.

== Filmography ==
- Non-Evil Twin (2022)
- Chicago Party Aunt (2022)
- The Rookie: Feds (2022)
- The Woman in the House Across the Street from the Girl in the Window (2022)
- Kenan (2022)
- Mixed-ish (2019-2021)
- Black-ish (2020)
- Why Women Kill (2019)
- Bunk'd (2019)
- Take My Wife (2018)
- Dog Moms (2016)
- Bajillion Dollar Propertie$ (2016)
- Uh, Hey Dude (2014)
- Key & Peele (2012-2013)
- Pet Intervention (2013)
- Mash Up (2012)
- The Dilemma (2011)
- Live Your Life with Cheryl Jackson (2009-2010)
- ER (2005)
