= Arica Himmel =

American actress

- Born: February 23, 2005 (age 21); New York City, New York, U.S.
- Occupation: Actress
- Years active: 2016–present
- Known for: Rainbow Johnson in Mixed-ish (2019)
- Height: 5 ft 4 in (163 cm)
- Mother: Zelma Davis

Arica Himmel (born February 23, 2005) is an American actress, best known for her role as Rainbow "Bow" Johnson in the ABC comedy series, Mixed-ish.

== Life and career ==
Himmel was born and raised in New York City. She is the daughter of Liberian singer-songwriter Zelma Davis and Brandon Himmel. Himmel has a sister, Zoe, who has also worked as an actress. She made her stage debut in the off-Broadway production of The Layover at the age of 11. In 2019, she made her film debut appearing in a supporting role opposite Judith Light in the comedy-drama film Before You Know It that premiered at the 2019 Sundance Film Festival.

In 2019, Himmel was cast as young Rainbow "Bow" Johnson, the leading character in the ABC comedy series Mixed-ish, a prequel spin-off of Black-ish.

== Filmography ==
=== Television ===
Year	Title	Role	Notes
2019	God Friended Me	Lindsay Levy	Episode: "Return to Sender
2019–2021	Mixed-ish	Rainbow "Bow" Johnson	Lead role
2020	Black-ish	Young Bow	Episode: "Friendgame"
2021–2022	Side Hustle	Tabitha	3 episodes
2023	Prom Pact	Zenobia	Main role
2024	Parish	Michaela	6 episodes
2025	Law & Order	Angela Ross	Episode: "Greater Good"
2025 - present	The Fall and Rise of Reggie Dinkins	Delilah Basmati	Recurring role

=== Films ===
Year	Title	Role	Notes	Ref.
2019	Before You Know It	Olivia		
TBA	Egg Baby †		Filming	
