= The Emissary (film) =

- Directed by: Jan Scholtz
- Written by: Jan Scholtz
- Produced by: Les Arlow (Executive producer); Johann Schoeman (Executive producer); Jan Scholtz (Producer)
- Starring: Ted Le Plat; Terry Norton; Robert Vaughn; André Jacobs; Patrick Mynhardt; Hans Strydom; Ken Gampu; Brian O'Shaughnessy; Peter Krummeck
- Cinematography: Johan Scheepers
- Edited by: Johan Lategan
- Music by: Robyn Smith
- Production company: Scholtz Films
- Distributed by: Lars International Pictures
- Release dates: October 1988 (MIFED (Mercato internazionale del film e del documentario)); 21 April 1989 (South Africa)
- Running time: 98 minutes
- Country: South Africa
- Language: English

The Emissary is a 1988 South African thriller film starring Ted Le Plat, Terry Norton, Robert Vaughn, André Jacobs, Patrick Mynhardt, Hans Strydom, Ken Gampu, Brian O'Shaughnessy, and Peter Krummeck. The film was written, produced, and directed by Jan Scholtz.

== Plot ==
Jack Cavanaugh (Le Plat) learns that the KGB use his wife (Norton) to get access to a top secret computer system. He cannot see what to do except to take on the foreign agents himself.

== Cast ==
- Ted Le Plat as Jack Cavanaugh (Credited as Ted Leplat)
- Terry Norton as Caroline Cavanaugh
- Robert Vaughn as Ambassador Ed MacKay
- André Jacobs as Hesse
- Patrick Mynhardt as Brochard
- Greg Latter as Walter Hennesy
- Jonathan Taylor as Christopher Fry
- Colin Sutcliffe as Matthew Holmes
- Hans Strydom as Justin Latimer
- Ken Gampu as Beamish
- Brian O'Shaughnessy as KGB General
- Peter Krummeck as Doctor

== Production ==
=== Filming ===
The Emissary was filmed in South Africa in 1988.

== Release ==
The Emissary premiered at MIFED in Italy in October 1988, before being released in South African theatres by Lars International Pictures on 21 April 1989. The film was released on VHS on 16 August 1989. The film can be streamed online by IFM Film Associates, Inc. The Emissary was released on DVD in the United Kingdom.

== See also ==
- List of South African films
- List of African films
