= Hans Strydom (actor) =

South African actor and writer

- Born: Johannes Strydom; 14 May 1947 (age 79); Durban, Natal, Union of South Africa
- Education: North-West University
- Alma mater: Potchefstroom University
- Occupations: Actor, assistant director, writer
- Years active: 1973–present

Johannes 'Hans' Strydom (born 14 May 1947) is a South African actor and writer. Considered as a legend in South African television, Strydom is best known for his roles in the popular serials Generations, Binnelanders and the film The Gods Must Be Crazy II. He was the first South African to be on television.

== Personal life ==
He was born on 14 May 1947 in Durban, Natal, Union of South Africa (now KwaZulu-Natal. He had his education from North-West University.

== Career ==
He graduated with a degree in law at Potchefstroom University. Then in 1964, he began working at the Department of Justice in Durban's Magistrate's Court. In 1972, he became a public prosecutor in Ladysmith. Between 1972 and 1976, he was a magistrate at the head office of the Department of Justice. In 1976, he quit his job to pursue a professional career as an actor. He later became one of the two persons to welcome South Africans on TV in January 1976 during the country's first national broadcasts along with David Hall-Green.

Then he appeared in several popular TV series, Binnelanders, Plek van die Vleisvreters, Westgate, Generations, Egoli: Place of Gold, The Res, Platinum and Oepse Daisy. In 1976, he made his film debut with Someone Like You. Then he starred in several early South African films such as Diamond and the Thief (1978), Someone Like You (1978), Autumnland (1982), The Emissary (1988). In 1989, he starred in the blockbuster The Gods Must Be Crazy II with the role 'Dr. Stephen Marshall'. In 2017, he won the ATKV award for the Best Actor for his Binnelanders role.

In 2000, he won a case against the SABC that did not properly reward actors for rebroadcasts. Since then, he has been helping artists claim the correct fees from the SABC.

== Partial filmography ==
| Year | Film | Role | Genre | Ref. |
|---|---|---|---|---|
| 1988 | The Emissary | Justin Latimer | Film | |
| 1989 | The Gods Must Be Crazy II | Dr. Stephen Marshall | Film | |
| 1995 | Sleurstroom | Geoff Walters | TV series | |
| 1996 | Hagenheim: Streng Privaat | Sol Pereira | TV series | |
| 1997 | Triptiek II | Charl Engelhardt | TV series | |
| 1997 | Carpe Diem | Mr. Beyers | TV series | |
| 1998 | Die Vierde Kabinet | Jack van Tonder | TV movie | |
| 1998 | Voete van Goud | Charles Morton | TV movie | |
| 2002 | Arsenaal | Senior Superintendent Combrink | TV series | |
| 2004 | Plek van die Vleisvreters | Bertus du Toit | TV series | |
| 2004 | Platinum | De Kock | TV movie | |
| 2005 | Oepse Daisy! | Prof. Awie Harmse | TV series | |
| 2009–present | Binnelanders | At Koster | TV series | |
