= Mixed-ish =

2019 American sitcom

- Genre: Period sitcom
- Created by: Kenya Barris; Peter Saji; Tracee Ellis Ross
- Starring: Tika Sumpter; Mark-Paul Gosselaar; Christina Anthony; Arica Himmel; Ethan William Childress; Mykal-Michelle Harris; Gary Cole
- Narrated by: Tracee Ellis Ross
- Music by: Daniel Moore
- Opening theme: "In the Mix" by Mariah Carey, Moroccan and Monroe Cannon
- Composer: Transcenders
- Country of origin: United States
- Original language: English
- No. of seasons: 2
- No. of episodes: 36

Production
- Executive producers: Anthony Anderson; Tracee Ellis Ross; Brian Dobbins; Helen Sugland; Kenya Barris; Peter Saji; Laurence Fishburne; Randall Winston; Karin Gist; Courtney Lilly
- Cinematography: Rob Sweeney; Troy Smith
- Editors: Thomas M. Bolger; Seth Clark; Jamie Nelsen; Jamie Conklin
- Camera setup: Single-camera
- Running time: 22 minutes
- Production companies: Artists First; Khalabo Ink Society; Cinema Gypsy Productions; ABC Signature (Note: Credited as ABC Studios in season 1.)

Original release
- Network: ABC
- Release: September 24, 2019 – May 18, 2021

Related
- Black-ish

Mixed-ish (stylized as mixed·ish) is an American single-camera sitcom created by Kenya Barris, Peter Saji and Tracee Ellis Ross that aired on ABC from September 24, 2019, to May 18, 2021. The series is a prequel to Black-ish, and the second series to be spun off from the parent series after the Freeform series Grown-ish. In May 2020, the series was renewed for a second season, which premiered on January 26, 2021. In May 2021, the series was canceled after two seasons.

== Premise ==
Loosely based on the early life of Dr. Rania Barris (co-creator Kenya Barris' ex-wife), Mixed-ish chronicles Rainbow Johnson's childhood years as she recounts her experience growing up in a mixed-race family in the 1980s. The family faces dilemmas over whether to assimilate or stay true to themselves when Rainbow's parents move from a hippie commune to the suburbs in 1985.

== Cast ==
=== Main ===
- Tika Sumpter as Alicia Johnson, Bow's mother who works hard as a lawyer at her father-in-law's practice and helps Bow embrace her African-American heritage.
- Mark-Paul Gosselaar as Paul Johnson, Bow's father. Paul is a stay-at-home white dad and is always there for the family. In season 2 he starts working as a teacher.
- Christina Anthony as Denise, Bow's maternal aunt; Alicia's sister. A very loving woman from Tennessee who is not afraid to express her African-American heritage (since her idea of culture is "influenced" by 227 and Eddie Murphy), even though she tends to be stereotypical towards the family's biracial culture.
- Arica Himmel as Rainbow Sojourner "Bow" Johnson, a 12-year-old preteen who is coming into her own while embracing her biracial heritage.
  - Tracee Ellis Ross as adult Rainbow Johnson (narration), who details her background and actual real-life events in each episode.
- Ethan William Childress as Johan Johnson, Rainbow's younger brother, who has started to adopt a street culture and muscular attitude.
  - Daveed Diggs as adult Johan Johnson (in fast-forward clips)
- Mykal-Michelle Harris as Santamonica "Santi" Elizabeth Johnson, Rainbow's younger sister, mischievous and full of sass
  - Rashida Jones as adult Santamonica Johnson (in fast-forward clips)
- Gary Cole as Harrison Johnson III, Bow's paternal grandfather; Paul's father. He died in 2007.

=== Recurring ===
- Paulet Del Castillo as Michaela
- Caitlin Kimball as Ms. Collins
- Trinitee Stokes as Tamika
- Isabel Myers as Rebecca
- Luca Luhan as Bryce

=== Guest ===
- Anthony Anderson as Andre "Dre" Johnson, Bow's future husband ("Becoming Bow", "Doctor! Doctor!", "Forever Young")
- Marcus Scribner as Andre "Junior" Johnson, Bow's future oldest son ("Becoming Bow")
- Miles Brown as Jack Johnson, Bow's future second oldest son ("Becoming Bow")
- Marsai Martin as Diane Johnson, Bow's future youngest daughter ("Becoming Bow")
- August and Berlin Gross as Devante Johnson, Bow's future youngest son ("Becoming Bow")
- Blake Anderson as Shaman Dave ("Becoming Bow")
- Dallas Young as Rodney ("Let Your Hair Down")
- Leiloni Arrie Pharms as Young Denise ("Love Is a Battlefield")
- Daria Johns as Shanice ("It's Tricky")
- Carolyne Maraghi as Wendy Whiteman ("Weird Science")
- Wayne Brady as Geoffrey, a geologist and Denise's boyfriend ("Every Little Step")

== Episodes ==
Season	Episodes	Originally released	
Season	Episodes	First released	Last released
1	23	September 24, 2019	May 5, 2020
2	13	January 26, 2021	May 18, 2021

=== Season 1 (2019–20) ===
No. overall	No. in season	Title	Directed by	Written by	Original release date	Prod. code	U.S. viewers (millions)
1	1	"Becoming Bow"	Anton Cropper	Teleplay by : Kenya Barris & Peter Saji; Story by : Kenya Barris & Peter Saji and Tracee Ellis Ross	September 24, 2019	101	3.91
Bow is introduced to the real world after living in a commune for 12 years. She learns what it means to be mixed race. Note: This was originally produced as the twenty-fourth episode in the fifth season of Black-ish.
2	2	"The Warrior"	Anton Cropper	Peter Saji	October 1, 2019	102	3.51
3	3	"Let Your Hair Down"	Michael Spiller	Karin Gist & Peter Saji	October 8, 2019	103	3.43
4	4	"Love is a Battlefield"	Stephanie Laing	Angela Nissel	October 15, 2019	104	2.73
5	5	"All She Wants to Do is Dance"	Matt Sohn	Jim Brandon & Brian Singleton	October 22, 2019	106	3.02
6	6	"Girls Just Want to Have Fun"	Oz Rodriguez	Tim Edwards & Kevin Marburger	October 29, 2019	105	3.10
7	7	"Puttin' on the Ritz"	Sam Bailey	Heather Flanders	November 12, 2019	107	2.80
8	8	"Weird Science"	Charles Stone III	Chuck Hayward	November 19, 2019	108	2.62
9	9	"Papa Don't Preach"	Todd Biermann	Angela Nissel	November 26, 2019	110	2.75
10	10	"Do They Know It's Christmas?"	Anu Valia	Rachelle Williams	December 10, 2019	109	2.96
11	11	"When Doves Cry"	Andrew DeYoung	Jim Brandon & Brian Singleton	January 7, 2020	111	4.77
12	12	"It's Tricky"	Maggie Carey	Heather Flanders	January 14, 2020	112	3.68
13	13	"Pride (In the Name of Love)"	Chris Robinson	Spencer Taylor	January 21, 2020	113	2.36
14	14	"True Colors"	Michael Spiller	Tim Edwards & Kevin Marburger	January 28, 2020	114	2.32
15	15	"This Charming Man"	Michael Spiller	Andrew Ti	February 11, 2020	115	2.35
16	16	"She Works Hard for the Money"	Anu Valia	Chuck Hayward	February 18, 2020	116	2.52
17	17	"Say Hello, Wave Goodbye"	Natalia Anderson	Jesse Esparza	February 25, 2020	117	2.30
18	18	"Parents Just Don't Understand"	Melissa Kosar	Melanie Kirschbaum & Alexandra Decas	March 17, 2020	118	2.86
19	19	"Doctor! Doctor!"	Shiri Appleby	Jim Brandon & Brian Singleton	March 24, 2020	119	2.86
20	20	"Bad Boys"	Matthew A. Cherry	Heather Flanders & Angela Nissel	April 7, 2020	120	2.84
21	21	"Nothing's Gonna Stop Us Now"	Matt Sohn	Peter Saji	April 14, 2020	122	2.46
22	22	"Every Little Step"	Pete Chatmon	Rachelle Williams	April 28, 2020	121	2.75
23	23	"You Got It All"	Natalia Anderson	Jesse Esparza & Spencer Taylor & Andrew Ti	May 5, 2020	123	2.63

=== Season 2 (2021) ===
No. overall	No. in season	Title	Directed by	Written by	Original release date	Prod. code	U.S. viewers (millions)
24	1	"Sweet Child O' Mine"	Todd Biermann	Jordan Reddout & Gus Hickey	January 26, 2021	201	2.67
25	2	"Brand New Funk"	Anton Cropper	Angela Nissel	February 2, 2021	202	2.25
26	3	"On My Own"	Todd Biermann	Jim Brandon & Brian Singleton	February 9, 2021	203	1.99
27	4	"Livin' on a Prayer"	Anton Cropper	Spencer Taylor	February 16, 2021	204	2.16
28	5	"My Prerogative"	Anton Cropper	Emilia Serrano	February 23, 2021	205	2.11
29	6	"Just the Two of Us"	Shiri Appleby	Jesse Esparza	March 2, 2021	206	1.74
30	7	"You Give Love a Bad Name"	Gail Lerner	Andrew Ti	March 23, 2021	207	1.90
31	8	"She's a Bad Mama Jama"	Anton Cropper	Helen Krieger	March 30, 2021	208	2.05
32	9	"Material Girl"	Natalia Anderson	Lindsey Shockley	April 6, 2021	209	1.66
33	10	"You Dropped a Bomb On Me"	Todd Biermann	Jordan Reddout & Gus Hickey	April 20, 2021	211	1.72
34	11	"Tainted Love"	Millicent Shelton	Carolyn Portner	April 27, 2021	210	1.75
35	12	"Walk This Way"	Anton Cropper	Jim Brandon & Brian Singleton	May 11, 2021	212	1.50
36	13	"Forever Young"	Anton Cropper	Eric Ernst	May 18, 2021	213	1.63

== Development ==
On May 2, 2019, it was announced that the Black-ish episode that was set to air May 7, 2019, would be shelved. The episode, titled "Becoming Bow", introduces a younger version of the character Rainbow living with her family, and would instead serve as the pilot episode for the new series, with the cast of the parent show appearing in a flash-forward cameo introduction. On May 14, 2019, it was announced that the series would premiere in the Fall of 2019 and air on Tuesdays at 9:00 P.M. The series premiered on September 24, 2019.

Tracee Ellis Ross, who plays the adult Bow in Black-ish, serves as both an executive producer and narrator for the series, with flagship costars Anthony Anderson and Laurence Fishburne also executive producing. Mixed-ish is the final series that Barris helped create prior to signing his deal with Netflix in August 2018. Barris had asked for an exit from his ABC Studios deal because of the studio's handling of controversial Black-ish episodes and of rejected pilots he had helped put together.

Anders Holm was originally set to play Bow's father, Paul Jackson, and played the role in the series’ pilot episode, but he left the series before it was picked up by ABC. On June 19, 2019, Mark-Paul Gosselaar replaced Holm in the Paul Jackson role, and scenes with Holm in the "Becoming Bow" episode-turned-pilot were subsequently reshot with Gosselaar.

In the promos, the family is called "the Johnsons" (the same surname as Bow's family on Black-ish), even though the surname of the characters Harrison and Paul is Jackson, which implies that Bow's maternal family still uses the name Johnson. This was brought up during the Black-ish second season episode "Johnson & Johnson," in which Dre learns that Bow never formally took his last name after their marriage. In addition, the episodes listed are named after songs, television shows, and movies that were made during the 1980s.

On October 28, 2019, the series received a full season order of 23 episodes.

On May 21, 2020, ABC renewed the series for a second season which premiered on January 26, 2021. On May 14, 2021, ABC canceled the series after two seasons.

== Release ==
=== Marketing ===
On May 14, 2019, ABC released the first official trailer for the series.

== Music ==
On August 5, 2019, singer-songwriter Mariah Carey confirmed that she recorded the series' theme song, entitled "In the Mix." The song was written and produced by Carey and songwriter-producer Daniel Moore and reached number nine on the Billboard U.S. R&B Digital Song Sales chart.

During a panel discussion with Barris and Carey, Barris explained that he wants Carey to appear as a guest on the show.

== Reception ==
=== Critical response ===
On review aggregator Rotten Tomatoes, Mixed-ish holds an approval rating of 76% based on 21 reviews, with an average rating of 7.10/10. The website's critical consensus reads, "While it needs more time to establish its own comedic voice, mixed-ish and its appealing cast are off to a sweet and smart start." On Metacritic, it has a weighted average score of 70 out of 100, based on 9 critics, indicating "generally favorable reviews".

=== Ratings ===
Viewership and ratings per season of Mixed-ish
Season	Timeslot (ET)	Episodes	First aired		Last aired		TV season	Viewership rank	Avg. viewers (millions)
Season	Timeslot (ET)	Episodes	Date	Viewers (millions)	Date	Viewers (millions)	TV season	Viewership rank	Avg. viewers (millions)
1	Tuesday 9:00 p.m.	23	September 24, 2019	3.91	May 5, 2020	2.63	2019–20	87	3.82
2	Tuesday 9:30 p.m.	13	January 26, 2021	2.67	May 18, 2021	1.63	2020–21	110	2.54

==== Season 1 ====
Viewership and ratings per episode of Mixed-ish
No.	Title	Air date	Rating/share (18–49)	Viewers (millions)	DVR (18–49)	DVR viewers (millions)	Total (18–49)	Total viewers (millions)
1	"Becoming Bow"	September 24, 2019	0.9/4	3.91	0.6	1.76	1.5	5.67
2	"The Warrior"	October 1, 2019	0.7/4	3.51	0.4	1.30	1.1	4.81
3	"Let Your Hair Down"	October 8, 2019	0.7/3	3.43	0.4	1.24	1.1	4.66
4	"Love is a Battlefield"	October 15, 2019	0.6/3	2.73	0.4	1.07	1.0	3.80
5	"All She Wants to Do is Dance"	October 22, 2019	0.7/3	3.02	0.4	1.02	1.1	4.03
6	"Girls Just Want to Have Fun"	October 29, 2019	0.8/3	3.10	0.3	0.91	1.1	4.01
7	"Puttin' on the Ritz"	November 12, 2019	0.6/3	2.80	0.3	0.91	0.9	3.71
8	"Weird Science"	November 19, 2019	0.6/3	2.62	0.3	0.90	0.9	3.52
9	"Papa Don't Preach"	November 26, 2019	0.6/3	2.75	0.2	0.84	0.8	3.60
10	"Do They Know It's Christmas?"	December 10, 2019	0.5/3	2.96	0.3	0.93	0.8	3.89
11	"When Doves Cry"	January 7, 2020	1.1/5	4.77	0.2	0.76	1.3	5.54
12	"It's Tricky"	January 14, 2020	0.7/4	3.68	0.2	0.78	0.9	4.46
13	"Pride (In the Name of Love)"	January 21, 2020	0.5/3	2.36	0.2	0.79	0.7	3.14
14	"True Colors"	January 28, 2020	0.5/3	2.32	0.2	0.75	0.7	3.07
15	"This Charming Man"	February 11, 2020	0.5	2.35	0.2	0.73	0.7	3.08
16	"She Works Hard for the Money"	February 18, 2020	0.5	2.52	0.2	0.69	0.7	3.20
17	"Say Hello, Wave Goodbye"	February 25, 2020	0.5	2.30	0.2	0.72	0.7	3.02
18	"Parents Just Don't Understand"	March 17, 2020	0.6	2.86	0.3	0.82	0.9	3.68
19	"Doctor! Doctor!"	March 24, 2020	0.6	2.86	0.2	0.74	0.8	3.60
20	"Bad Boys"	April 7, 2020	0.6	2.84	0.1	0.62	0.7	3.44
21	"Nothing's Gonna Stop Us Now"	April 14, 2020	0.5	2.46	0.2	0.67	0.7	3.14
22	"Every Little Step"	April 28, 2020	0.5	2.75	0.2	0.66	0.7	3.40
23	"You Got It All"	May 5, 2020	0.5	2.63	0.2	0.74	0.7	3.38

==== Season 2 ====
Viewership and ratings per episode of Mixed-ish
No.	Title	Air date	Rating (18–49)	Viewers (millions)	DVR (18–49)	DVR viewers (millions)	Total (18–49)	Total viewers (millions)
1	"Sweet Child O' Mine"	January 26, 2021	0.6	2.67	TBD	TBD	TBD	TBD
2	"Brand New Funk"	February 2, 2021	0.5	2.25	TBD	TBD	TBD	TBD
3	"On My Own"	February 9, 2021	0.4	1.99	TBD	TBD	TBD	TBD
4	"Livin' on a Prayer"	February 16, 2021	0.5	2.16	TBD	TBD	TBD	TBD
5	"My Prerogative"	February 23, 2021	0.4	2.11	TBD	TBD	TBD	TBD
6	"Just the Two of Us"	March 2, 2021	0.4	1.74	TBD	TBD	TBD	TBD
7	"You Give Love a Bad Name"	March 23, 2021	0.4	1.90	TBD	TBD	TBD	TBD
8	"She's a Bad Mama Jama"	March 30, 2021	0.4	2.05	TBD	TBD	TBD	TBD
9	"Material Girl"	April 6, 2021	0.3	1.66	TBD	TBD	TBD	TBD
10	"You Dropped a Bomb On Me"	April 20, 2021	0.3	1.72	TBD	TBD	TBD	TBD
11	"Tainted Love"	April 27, 2021	0.3	1.75	TBD	TBD	TBD	TBD
12	"Walk This Way"	May 11, 2021	0.3	1.50	0.1	0.54	0.5	2.04
13	"Forever Young"	May 18, 2021	0.3	1.63	0.1	0.55	0.4	2.19
