= Binnelanders =

South African Afrikaans-language TV soap opera

- Genre: Soap opera, drama
- Developed by: 20th Century Fox Africa
- Written by: Mitzi Booysen
- Directed by: Danie Joubert
- Starring: Hykie Berg; Reynard Hugo; Hans Strydom; Je-ani Swiegelaar; Germandt Geldenhuys; Marlee van der Merwe; Gerald Steyn; Melinda Viljoen; Roberto Kyle; Izette Blignaut; Antoinette Modise; Megan Troksie
- Theme music composer: Jak de Priester
- Opening theme: Binneland by Jak de Priester
- Country of origin: South Africa
- Original language: Afrikaans
- No. of seasons: 15
- No. of episodes: 4250+

Production
- Producers: Elsje & Human Stark
- Production location: Pretoria
- Running time: 30 minutes (approx.)
- Production company: Stark Films

Original release
- Network: M-Net, kykNet
- Release: 15 October 2005

Binnelanders (previously Binneland and Binneland Sub Judice) is a South African Afrikaans-language soap opera. It is set in and around the fictional private hospital, Binneland Kliniek, in Pretoria, and the storyline follows the trials, trauma and tribulations of the staff and patients of the hospital. The series is produced by Friedrich and Elsje Stark of Stark Productions.Hans Strydom is the only cast member to be present in every season.

== Production history ==
Binnelanders began as a weekly one-hour drama, the first episode of which was broadcast only in Afrikaans on 13 October 2005 on both M-Net and kykNET. Halfway through the show's second season, it became a daily half-hour soap opera, and English subtitles were introduced. It was broadcast directly after Egoli on M-Net in the 18:30 time slot. Programming shifted to the 18:00 timeslot in preparation for the conclusion of Egoli, after which Binnelanders would extend over a one-hour period, consuming both time slots. The title of the show was changed to Binneland Sub Judice, and a new legal firm, Rossouw, Paulse and Knight Incorporated (RPK), was added to the storyline, along with new characters. For the seventh season, the show was again renamed, this time to simply Binneland. The legal angle of the series was dropped, and the show was reverted to a half-hour time slot. Binneland was removed from M-Net in early 2011, the name was changed back to Binnelanders and the show is now broadcast exclusively on kykNET.

== Opening sequence ==
The theme song used in Binnelanders was written and performed by Afrikaans artist Jak de Priester. The title sequence was changed for Sub Judice, but later reverted to the original, with a few modifications.

== Main cast ==
- Hans Strydom as Dr. At Koster
- Hykie Berg as Dr. Conrad Bester
- Reynard Hugo as Dr. Tertius Jonker
- Je-ani Swiegelaar as Naomi Koster
- Germandt Geldenhuys as Louis Koster
- Kate Roothman as Dr. Nicolette Nortje
- Gerard Steyn as Dr. Uys Wagener
- Melinda Viljoen as Tracy Jonker
- Marlee van der Merwe as Dr. Ella Swart
- Antoinette Modise as Bonnie
- Roberto Kyle as Dr. Joe Olivier
- Meghan Troksie as Thalia
