= Survivor South Africa: Maldives =

- Season 4
- Presented by: Nico Panagio
- No. of days: 27
- No. of castaways: 19
- Winner: Hykie Berg
- Runner-up: Letshego Moshoeu
- Location: Addu Atoll, Maldives
- No. of episodes: 14

Release
- Original network: M-Net
- Original release: February 24 – May 26, 2011

Season chronology
- ← Previous; Santa Carolina Next → Champions

Survivor South Africa: Maldives is the fourth season of the South African reality television show Survivor South Africa. It premiered on February 24, 2011, and concluded with a live finale on May 26, 2011. The season was filmed in the Addu Atoll of the island nation of the Maldives, and was the second season to be hosted by Nico Panagio.

The season featured 19 contestants competing in the Addu Atoll of the island nation of the Maldives over 27 days for a prize of one million rand and the title of Ultimate Survivor. Ten contestants were ordinary South Africans picked out of obscurity from open auditions ("Plebs") while nine were South African celebrities ("Celebs").

The season concluded when 32-year-old Celeb Hykie Berg was named the Ultimate Survivor over 27-year-old Pleb Letshego Moshoeu by an 8–3 jury vote.

== Contestants ==
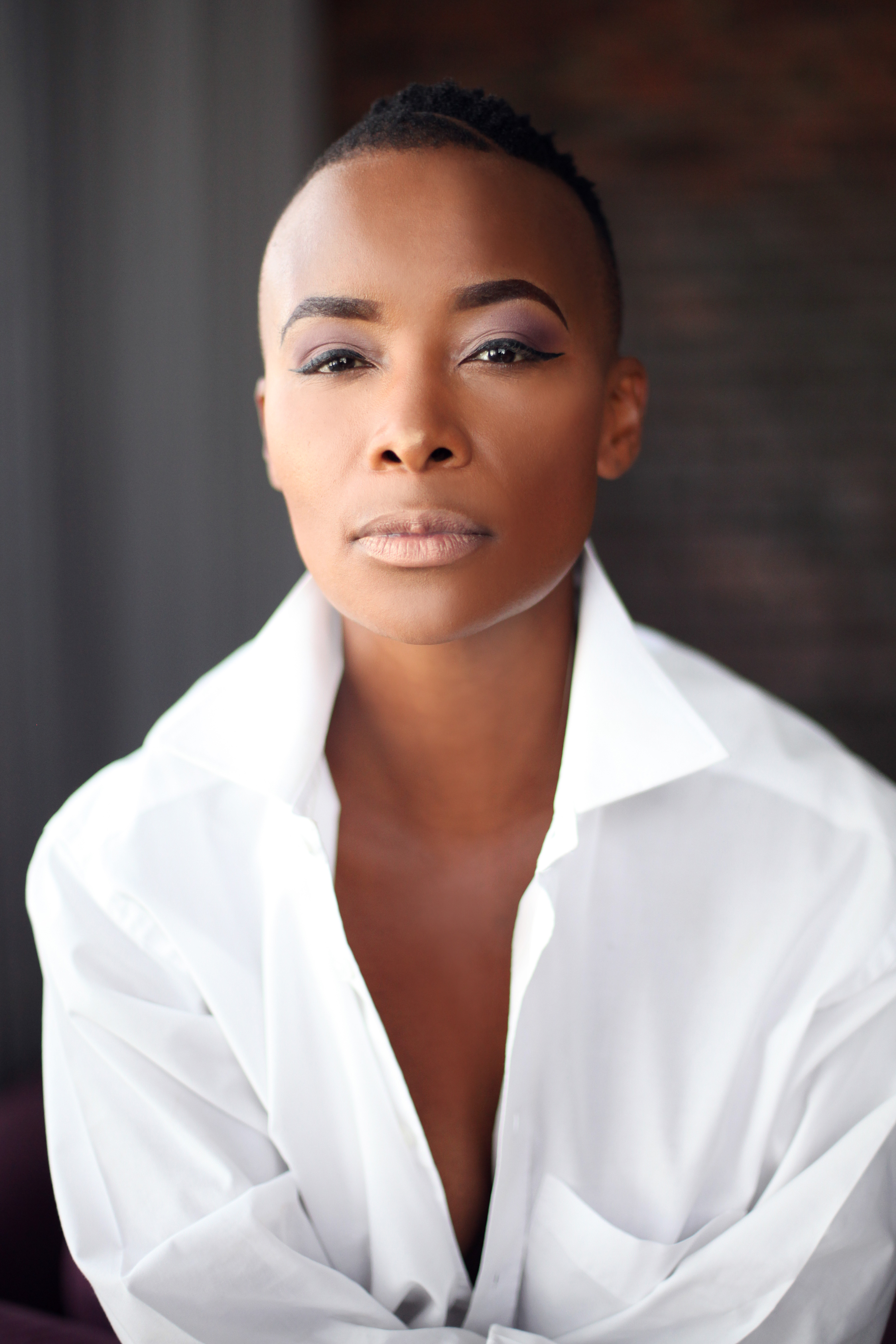
Bonnie Mbuli

The cast was composed of 10 regular South Africans ("Plebs") and 9 celebrities ("Celebs"). Initially separated on 2 different islands based on their status, each group was unaware of the other group's presence. Both groups were separated into two teams (simply referred to as "Blue" and "Yellow") that would later be their official tribes. After the Blue Plebs faced a Tribal Council, the 18 remaining players formed the Goma tribe (composed of both Blue teams) and Raituhn tribe (composed of both Yellow teams) on Day 4. After a double tribal council on Day 15, the two tribes merged on Day 16 to form the tribe, Eku.

The final 12 players remaining made up the two finalists and the ten members of the Tribal Council Jury, who - along with the South African public as the 11th Juror - ultimately decided who would be the "Ultimate Survivor".

Contestant	Original Island	Original tribe	Merged tribe	Finish
Lukhanyo Nontshinga; 27, Kimberley, Northern Cape	Pleb Island	Goma (Note: Lukhanyo was eliminated before Tribes officially formed on Day 4. He was on the Blue Pleb team, that would later form the Goma tribe)		1st voted out Day 3
Philicity Reeken; 30, Johannesburg, Gauteng; Actress	Celeb Island	Goma (Note: For drawing the black sandbag, Philicity was not initially assigned a tribe; once the Celebs and Plebs were united, she joined Goma, the tribe that lost the first immunity challenge.)		2nd voted out Day 5
Tshepo Maseko; 36, Johannesburg, Gauteng; Actor	Celeb Island	Raituhn		3rd voted out Day 7
Tasleem Vally; 25, Durban, KwaZulu-Natal	Pleb Island	Raituhn		4th voted out Day 9
Carmel Fisher; 29, Johannesburg, Gauteng; Actress, TV presenter	Celeb Island	Raituhn		5th voted out Day 11
Jacques Terre'Blanche; 28, Johannesburg, Gauteng; Singer, former Idols contestant	Celeb Island	Goma		Quit; Day 12
Sindi Lukhele; 25, Johannesburg, Gauteng	Pleb Island	Goma		6th voted out Day 14
Vanessa Haywood; 33, Cape Town, Western Cape; Actress, TV presenter	Celeb Island	Goma		Medically evacuated 1st jury member Day 15
Roxy Burger; 24, Johannesburg, Gauteng; TV presenter	Celeb Island	Goma		7th voted out 2nd jury member Day 15
Harry Wiggins; 27, Worcester, Western Cape	Pleb Island	Raituhn		8th voted out 3rd jury member Day 15
Simon Coetzer; 40, Johannesburg, Gauteng	Pleb Island	Goma	Eku	9th voted out 4th jury member Day 17
Malusi Mbambo; 30, Durban, KwaZulu-Natal	Pleb Island	Raituhn	Eku	10th voted out 5th jury member Day 19
Tejan Pillay; 32, Durban, KwaZulu-Natal	Pleb Island	Raituhn	Eku	11th voted out 6th jury member Day 21
Sean September; 40, Cape Town, Western Cape	Pleb Island	Goma	Eku	12th voted out 7th jury member Day 23
Alison de Chazal; 53, Durban, KwaZulu-Natal	Pleb Island	Goma	Eku	13th voted out 8th jury member Day 25
Mxolisi "MXO" Lokwe; 31, Johannesburg, Gauteng; Musician, songwriter	Celeb Island	Goma	Eku	14th voted out 9th jury member Day 26
Bonnie Mbuli; 31, Cape Town, Western Cape; Actress, TV presenter	Celeb Island	Raituhn	Eku	15th voted out 10th jury member Day 27
Letshego Moshoeu; 26, Johannesburg, Gauteng	Pleb Island	Raituhn	Eku	Runner-up; Day 27
Hykie Berg; 32, Johannesburg, Gauteng; Actor	Celeb Island	Raituhn	Eku	Ultimate Survivor; Day 27

=== Future appearances ===
Tejan Pillay competed again in Survivor South Africa: Return of the Outcasts in 2022.

== Season summary ==
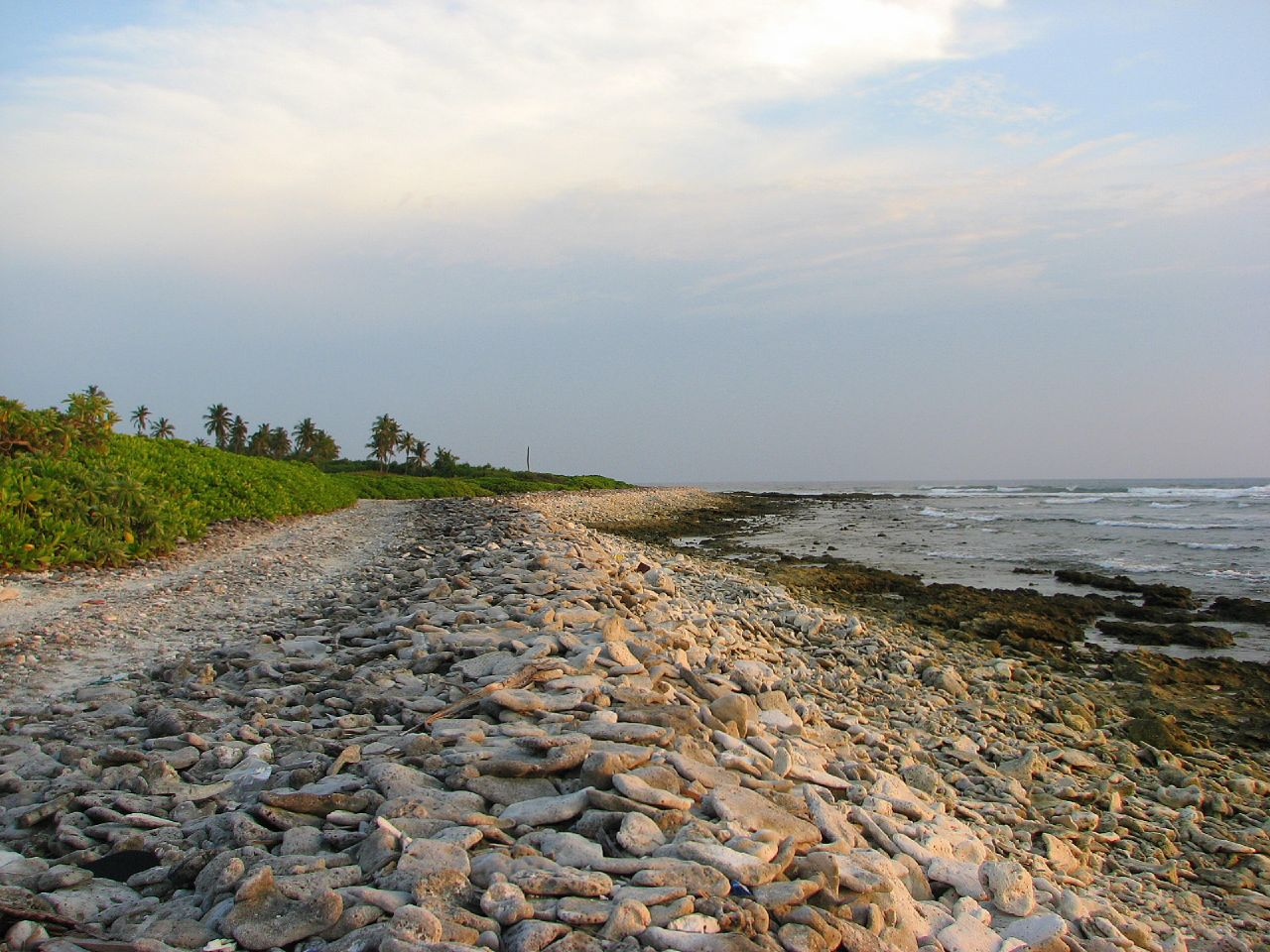
The season was filmed in Addu Atoll in the Maldives.

Nineteen castaways, consisting of 10 regular South Africans ("Plebs") and 9 celebrities ("Celebs"), arrived in the Maldives. Initially separated on 2 different islands based on their status, each group was unaware of the other group's presence. Both groups were separated into two teams (simply referred to as "Blue" and "Yellow") that would later be the official tribes. After the Blue Plebs faced a Tribal Council, the 18 remaining players formed the Goma tribe (composed of both Blue teams) and Raituhn tribe (composed of both Yellow teams). Each tribe then assigned the weakest player in their tribes with a Black Cowrie shell, which added a vote against them at each Tribal Council before the merge. After the unification, Raituhn initially were down in numbers due to a clear divide where the "Plebs" kept betraying the outnumbered "Celebs". However, a series of events in Goma that saw a tribe member quitting, a majority alliance blindsided by an idol, and a medical evacuation, led to an unsteady Raituhn alliance entering the merge with a 5-4 majority.

The merge saw the introduction of a White Cowrie shell in Bonnie's possession; this shell nullified a single vote at a Tribal Council. While the Raituhn alliance initially voted out Goma's leader, Simon, the "Celebs" Bonnie and Hykie used the White Cowrie and a hidden immunity idol to betray their alliance with the Raituhn "Plebs" until only Letshego remained. Before the remaining Goma "Plebs", Alison and Sean, could convince Letshego to flip on the "Celeb" duo, she found a hidden immunity idol and stuck with the powerful duo of Bonnie and Hykie to pick off the remaining Goma alliance. Despite a surprising final immunity challenge win by Letshego, who sent Bonnie to the jury to finally break up the strategic "Celeb" duo, the jury criticized both her and Hykie's poor social games, but felt that Hykie's cutthroat strategic game alongside Bonnie was more deserving than Letshego's under-the-radar game. Along with South Africa deciding in a public poll to award him with a jury vote, the jury awarded Hykie the title of Ultimate Survivor in an 8–3 victory over Letshego.

Challenge winners and eliminations by episode
Episode		Challenge winner(s)		Eliminated	Finish
No.	Original air date	Reward	Immunity	Eliminated	Finish
1	February 24, 2011	Goma; Celebs (Note: Only the Celebs participated in the Reward Challenge. The Blue Celeb team (that would later be Goma), won.)	Raituhn; Plebs (Note: Only the Plebs participated in the Immunity Challenge. The Yellow Pleb team (that would later be Raituhn) won, sending the Blue Pleb team to Tribal Council.)	Lukhanyo	1st voted out Day 3
2	March 3, 2011	Raituhn	Raituhn	Philicity	2nd voted out Day 5
3	March 10, 2011	Raituhn	Goma	Tsepho	3rd voted out Day 7
4	March 17, 2011	Goma	Goma	Tasleem	4th voted out Day 9
5	March 24, 2011	Raituhn	Jacques [Goma] (Note: This challenge was a one-on-one duel, with Jacques and Tejan chosen to compete by their respective tribes. The other members of the tribe did not witness the challenge. Jacques won the challenge and was given a secret moral dilemma: take Tribal Immunity for his tribe or take a Hidden Immunity Idol and a burger, with the non-selected option being given to Tejan. Jacques took the Tribal Immunity for Goma with Tejan being left with the Idol and burger.)	Carmel	5th voted out Day 11
6	March 31, 2011	Raituhn	Raituhn (Note: This challenge was an endurance challenge. After six hours, Nico informed the tribes that it would not be safe for the tribes to be taken to their camps after sunset and gave both tribes a decision: to continue the challenge and sleep at the challenge site, or forfeit and return to camp for the night. Goma elected to forfeit, giving Ratiuhn Tribal Immunity.)	Jacques	Quit; Day 12
6	March 31, 2011	Raituhn	Raituhn	Sindi	6th voted out Day 14
7	April 7, 2011	Raituhn	None (Note: There was no immunity challenge as both tribes were to attend Tribal Council that night.)	Vanessa	Evacuated; 1st jury member Day 15
7	April 7, 2011	Raituhn	None	Roxy	7th voted out 2nd jury member Day 15
7	April 7, 2011	Raituhn	None	Harry	8th voted out 3rd jury member Day 15
8	April 14, 2011	Goma	Letshego	Simon	9th voted out 4th jury member Day 17
9	April 21, 2011	Tejan [Bonnie, Hykie]	Sean	Malusi	10th voted out 5th jury member Day 19
10	April 28, 2011	Survivor; Auction	Sean	Tejan	11th voted out 6th jury member Day 21
11	May 5, 2011	Sean [Alison, MXO]	~~Hykie~~ (Bonnie) (Note: At Tribal Council, Hykie chose to give his immunity to Bonnie.)	Sean	12th voted out 7th jury member Day 23
12	May 12, 2011	Hykie [Letshego]	Letshego	Alison	13th voted out 8th jury member Day 25
13	May 19, 2011	None	Bonnie	MXO	14th voted out 9th jury member Day 26
13	May 19, 2011	None	Letshego	Bonnie	15th voted out 10th jury member Day 27
14	May 26, 2011			Jury vote	
14	May 26, 2011			Letshego	Runner-up; Day 27
14	May 26, 2011			Hykie	Ultimate Survivor; Day 27

In the case of multiple tribes or castaways who win reward or immunity, they are listed in order of finish, or alphabetically where it was a team effort; where one castaway won and invited others, the invitees are in brackets.

== Episodes ==
No.	Title	Original release date
1	"Episode 1"	February 24, 2011
Reward Challenge: The Celebrities were split into two teams (Blue and Yellow) while the odd celebrity out was without a team with the colour Black. The teamed up celebrities would then battle against each other on a platform, one-on-one, trying to push the other team off the platform. The first team to 6 wins reward.; Reward: Fishing Gear.; Immunity Challenge: The Plebs were also split into two teams of Blue and Yellow. The two teams had to race out to the buoys in the water in rafts. At the two buoys there were keys that would unlock puzzle pieces. Once a team received their keys and reached back at the beach, they would have to solve a palindrome. The first team to correctly identify and display the palindrome wins immunity.; The game began with the Celebrity and the Pleb castaways banished to their respective islands by Maldivian officials. There were 9 Celebrities and 10 Plebs, both groups unaware of the other's existence in the game. Settling into the conditions on their islands, the Celebrities and the Plebs were taken to reward and immunity challenges respectively, still unaware of the other challenge or group partaking in the game. Early alliances within the celebrity island, such as Hykie and Jacques, were abruptly ruined by the division into the two sides. However, the Celebrities and Plebs were sent back to their island homes after their respective challenges. The blue team's Celebrities consisting of Jacques, MXO, Roxy and Vanessa earned fishing gear, and the yellow team's Plebs (consisting of Harry, Letshego, Malusi, Tasleem and Tejan) earned immunity. Philicity, based on the team selection at the Celebrities' reward challenge, was placed without a team, with a black buff. The other 8 Celebrities were confused by this twist alongside the fact that they were split into three groups of 4-4-1. The Plebs under the blue team were sent to Tribal Council, watched by the yellow team's Plebs. Lukhanyo, under the blue Plebs team, formed an early alliance with Sindi, while Simon and Alison sided with each other, leaving the remaining blue Pleb, Sean on the outside. Both alliances thought initially that voting out the lone agent would be logical, until Sean and Simon thought that voting out Lukhanyo right now, being the biggest perceived physical threat out of all of their known competitors, would be strategically best. Heading into Tribal Council, Lukhanyo was unaware of the sudden change in conspiring against him and was blindsided, becoming the first person voted out of the Maldives.
2	"Episode 2"	March 3, 2011
Reward Challenge: The two newly formed tribes were pitted against each other in an obstacle course, involving a high wall, followed by balancing beams to the first pit stop. All 9 members of the tribe have to reach the pit stops before they can continue in the course. The second stage involved a leopard crawl through mud and traversing up and over a steep, smooth incline, jumping into a water pit. The third stage consisted of a tunnel that they would enter single-file, and then travel across columns using two planks to reach the end of the course; falling off or letting the plank touch the ground meant that person/plank had to go back to the beginning of the columns. Using the planks, the entire team at the final stage would have to reach a suspended key, unlock a chest and create a giant drumstick. The first tribe to take that drumstick and bang the gong at the end of the course wins.; Reward: First pick of which island to live on, a survival guide expert on Maldivian islands for a day.; Black Cowrie Challenge: Directly after the Reward Challenge, the two tribes were asked on first impressions to select one of their own as someone who were the most unlikely to be the Ultimate Survivor at the end of the game. Tasleem for the new Raituhn (Yellow) tribe (5 votes over Harry's 4) and Alison from the new Goma (Blue) tribe (4 votes over Philicity's 3 and MXO's 2) received the most votes from their peers. Thus, Tasleem and Alison would each receive the Black Cowrie shell for both sides.; The Celebs and Plebs finally met each other on Day 4, at the second reward challenge. Philicity received a blue buff due to Lukhanyo's elimination the night before. The castaways were introduced to their new tribe names, Raituhn (Yellow) and Goma (Blue). After a grueling reward challenge, the two tribes partook in the Black Cowrie challenge. Explained to the castaways, the person holding the Black Cowrie at Tribal Council would automatically have one vote against them. The only way that they could prevent that from happening would be at the beginning of an immunity challenge, they would be offered an opportunity to defect to the opposing tribe and neglect the Black Cowrie. If someone was voted off while wearing one of the Black Cowries, they would select one of the remaining castaways to receive the Cowrie. This would include someone who has neglected the Plus-One vote effect of their Cowrie. Alison debated on defecting immediately to Raituhn before the next immunity challenge, while Tasleem seemed otherwise to the thought at that moment. The Celebs in Goma decided that they would stick together and pick off the Plebs one by one until the merger occurs, while the entire Raituhn tribe received their reward of the survival guide showing them what they could use to survive the entire game.: Immunity Challenge: The two tribes would select a swimmer to receive a tanker out in the water. The catch was that the team would have to unravel a large rope that was connected to the swimmer, so that they could go out to receive the tanker. Once at the tanker, the swimmer would attach it to the tribe's rope, giving a signal for them to pull it to dry land. Once the tanker is up on dry land and pulled far enough inland, they could use it to obtain a key to unlock a lever. The first tribe to pull their lever and raise their flag wins immunity.; At the immunity challenge, both Tasleem and Alison chose not to defect to their opposing tribes. After Raituhn's third consecutive challenge win, Goma's Celebs began discussion about picking off someone from the Plebs' side of their tribe, excluding Alison due to her Black Cowrie. However Simon and Sean convinced Vanessa that for the mean time, if they voted off someone weak, they could win a couple of challenges before reaching the merge. This made targets out of the celebs Roxy and Philicity. Goma also searched for missing items that the Plebs had lost at the beginning of the game, only finding a pot, while still looking for their machete. Once they arrived at Tribal Council, Simon highlighted the fact that the tribe was united under one banner instead of an expected divide between Celebs and Plebs. However, the divided vote showed signs of a divided group. Though Philicity campaigned that she would be more useful in mental challenges over Roxy, she ended up being voted out, with Alison receiving the first Black Cowrie vote.
3	"Episode 3"	March 10, 2011
Returning from Tribal Council, Goma appeared determined to turn their unfortunate challenge run as soon as possible. The next morning, the entire tribe expressed how MXO's naive approach to the game would be useful for both alliances. Over at Raituhn, Tejan, Malusi and Harry discussed how fellow Pleb Tasleem holding the Black Cowrie would affect them at Tribal Council. Harry nominated himself to divert the celebrities' attention to him, so that a 5-5 tie between Tasleem and a celeb would not occur.: Reward Challenge: One castaway of each tribe was selected to be suspended within a pyramid structure, blindfolded. The rest of the tribe must coordinate the elected castaway to reach out for 11 puzzle pieces hanging on hooks along the four beams. Dropping a puzzle piece means that the tribe will have to pick it up with a hooked pole. Once they collect the pieces one by one, sliding them down a collection chute, the tribe can then build the puzzle of their tribe's flag. Two castaways at a time can build the puzzle.; Reward: Their five choices of means for survival ranging from pangas, tent covers, etc provided in a catalogue before the challenge.; Despite their fourth consecutive challenge win, tensions soared amongst Raituhn. The explosive tempers of both Tsepho and Hykie revealed themselves as three 10 second penalties were placed on them by Tsepho's lack of discipline. Bonnie and the rest of the tribe immediately calmed a frustrated Tsepho from calling out Hykie for his foul language during the challenge towards the fellow soap actor. Back at the islands, Harry confronted Hykie about the challenge, where Harry had nominated himself to take care of the puzzle, agreed upon by the tribe. However, during the challenge, Hykie and Bonnie dealt with the puzzle instead of Harry. The two got into a heated discussion about the situation, where Hykie thought it was completely unnecessary. The two eventually apologized and returned to the rest of the tribe. Returning from the challenge, Simon discovered the lost panga in the ocean, though that didn't help the food situation for the tribe. After the reward challenge, Roxy broke down in tears from physical exertion as the tribe's suspended player; also, Alison and Vanessa, on Day 7, were in tears during the morning.: Immunity Challenge: A combination of rugby, water polo and basketball, the two tribes would be placed in a water based field. Nico would release a ball into the playing field for a runner each tribe to compete for it. Then the rest of the tribes follow suit. They need to land the ball into nets on the other side of the field. The first tribe to score 5 points wins. Challenge from Survivor: Santa Carolina.; Raituhn's tensions that arose in the Reward challenge reared its ugly head during a fierce immunity challenge, which Goma took advantage of, leading to their first immunity win. Afterwards, the celebs in Raituhn were feeling comfortable about their allegiance amongst themselves and Tejan, while Harry and the rest of the Plebs felt relatively secure until Carmel revealed to Harry that the Celebs were targeting Tasleem. Earlier in Day 7, the tribes were told of the presence of a hidden immunity idol on each of their camps. Harry had already found it before everyone else was awake, hiding the Cowrie shell with Raituhn's octopus on it and forgetting its new location by accident. The event of a tie between the Pleb's target celeb and for the cursed Tasleem appeared more and more likely, so Harry took the initiative during Tribal Council and caused an argument with Hykie again about the puzzle incident that took place the day before. Boldly, his plan worked and the celebs voted for him, and not Tasleem, allowing the Plebs to pick off their first celeb, Tsepho. Tasleem received the second Black Cowrie vote.
4	"Episode 4"	March 17, 2011
The Celebs from Raituhn were furious over the deceit of Tsepho's removal from the game. Bonnie and Carmel felt blindsided by Tejan, whom they had thought up until then was aligning himself with the Celebs in Raituhn. On Day 8, Harry still searched for the idol he lost the day before, informing his alliance partners, Tejan and Malusi, of his discovery and misfortune. Their plan of keeping this information of the idol a secret was ruined when Carmel discovered the pouch that contained the idol in Harry's clothing. She forced Harry then to inform the entire tribe that he found the idol, but wouldn't believe him when he said that he had lost it. Goma, however, were more worried about their food situation, forcing themselves to eat yams to the point where they were sick and tired of them.: Reward Challenge: An adaptation of a local Maldivian game, each tribe takes turns playing a game where one team is required to hit balls into the field the opposing team is in. A point is scored by the ball landing on the ground safely or hitting the ball right into the special net at the far side of the field. Each member of the tribe has five balls to hit into the scoring zone. The first four have to be hit with their backs towards the field, and the last one with the castaway facing towards the field. If an opposing castaway catches a ball, that person is out for their 5 balls and is replaced by the next tribemate. 50 balls must be played or the tribe finishes their 5-minute inning (one inning for each tribe).; Reward: Once the losing tribe has left the challenge arena, the winning tribe was asked for what they really wanted and in this case, they received a 3 course Maldivian meal for the entire tribe.; Between the two challenges, Roxy shared with Vanessa and Jacques that she had found the clue for the Goma idol inside the treemail, and the three searched for it together, maintaining that it would be their alliance's and not the individual's, whoever found it. They successfully found it under the water along the shoreline. Apart from this, Alison and Sindi started to try and convince Roxy that she should turn on Vanessa, due to their dislike for her attitude around camp. Roxy, with the idol in her alliance's possession, saw no need to correct the Plebs that Vanessa was not planning to oust Roxy again and used this opportunity to fool them into believing she appreciated the false rumours they supplied her. At the immunity challenge, both Alison and Tasleem refused to defect to their opposing tribes and kept their Black Cowrie shells.: Immunity Challenge: The two tribes start from opposite sides of an obstacle course that stretches over land and sea. Every castaway is attached to their tribe by their harness and equipped with a sandbag holding 10% of their body weight. Traversing the obstacle course the tribes try and catch the other tribe. At two quit stops along the looping obstacle course, the castaways can quit the challenge, by giving their sandbag to someone else and then unclipping their harness from the tribe. The tribe who catches the other tribe, wins immunity.; Following Raituhn's second immunity challenge defeat, Tejan and Tasleem both expressed that the tribe needed their strength again to win challenges, especially after the last one which exhausted Hykie and Bonnie. The two perceived weakest members, Bonnie and Tasleem, were on the chopping block. However, Tasleem felt defeated about her hopes of surviving the rest of the game on the island. Hykie made a proposition to Tejan that the Plebs would vote for Tasleem now, instead of Bonnie. At Tribal Council, Tejan was asked to explain the dynamic of Raituhn from his perspective, which would look like 5-3 based on the last Tribal Council, whereas Carmel opposed that view and said they were united finally. Both including Hykie announced that they needed to be strong for the upcoming challenges instead of worrying about alliances at this stage. Carmel's description of the tribe was accurate as everyone decided to vote off Tasleem, who at that stage appeared mentally weak as well as physically weak around camp. Before leaving the Tribal Council area, Tasleem passed on the Black Cowrie to Bonnie.
5	"Episode 5"	March 24, 2011
Jacques on Goma in the early hours of the morning on Day 10 started to express feelings of withdrawing from the game, causing friction with Pleb Sindi, who thought it was a waste of time where someone else could have wanted the opportunity in playing Survivor. Back at Raituhn, the Celebs were not relieved after the previous night's vote of Tasleem. Still under the impression that their days were numbered with the Plebs still in the majority on their tribe. Malusi discussed the ramifications of Tejan's openness of his game plan that he revealed to the entire tribe the night before, but Tejan was quick to reply that he's too confident that the plan will work for his unveiling to be a future hindrance. Carmel sought to reconnect with Tejan, in order to obtain some form of security in her position in her turbulent tribe, but Tejan was already contemplating strategies going into the merge with someone like Carmel where she could flip over, or someone like Hykie who might align with Goma's Jacques.: Reward Challenge: A larger but simplified version of Battleships. On a 10 x 10 vertical structure, with alternating coloured blocks of yellow and blue, each tribe has to place 5 helmets behind their opposing tribe's colour. They must either be diagonal, vertical or horizontal in line and in a 2 and 3 combination. Alongside these helmets, they must place optional rewards up on the board. Taking turns, each tribe will push a block of their colour through the structure, hoping that they've taken out a helmet. If an optional reward is knocked off the structure, both tribes lose out on that reward. The first tribe to knock off all 5 opposing tribe's helmets wins reward.; Reward: Portions of rice and sweet potatoes (with the choice of splitting the main prize), and the remaining optional rewards on the structure at the end of the game, ranging from coffee, chocolate cake, biltong, peanuts and bottles of wine.; After Raituhn's victory in the Reward Challenge, simmering tension in the Goma camp emerged from Vanessa's annoyance of MXO's presence, ranging from his aloof behaviour around camp to his singing, while Alison thought that someone like MXO was refreshing for her. Jacques was so disappointed with the result of the reward challenge, especially about both tribes knocking out the biltong prizes, that he informed the rest of Goma that he wanted to quit the game as soon as possible, explaining that he was worried for his skin condition due to a disease he had which affected his skin, especially his hands. Based on first impressions of the treemail for the immunity challenge, if the selected champion lost the challenge, they would possibly be eliminated from the game. Goma selected Jacques, respecting his request. Raituhn chose Tejan to represent them, with him expressing that he could now be seen as a physical threat by his tribemates.: Immunity Challenge: A champion is selected by the tribes to represent them in the challenge. The challenge involves starting from a buoy structure and swimming to shore, where they are given a clue to a check point with a key inside. After visiting two checkpoints holding two keys, they must return to the shore to unlock rowboats. The rowboats must go around a marked course in the water, returning to the shore where the last leg involves cycling to the finish line and meeting Nico on a platform. The first person to reach Nico is given the option of choosing immunity for their tribe, or a hidden immunity idol and a small meal. The other will receive what the challenge victor doesn't choose.; Jacques and Tejan changed positions during the immunity challenge, with Jacques leading in the swimming and Tejan taking over in the running. In the end, Jacques caught back up with Tejan in the rowboat section and blazed through the cycling section to reach Nico first. Jacques chose the team immunity and informed Nico of his request to withdraw from the game. Nico questioned the musician's integrity by his decision to partake in this challenge, winning it for his tribe, and then wanting to quit. Jacques responded that if he did win, that it would have been a parting gesture that he could make to benefit for his tribe. Leaving the challenge, Jacques decided on staying in the game until the next reward challenge to take the immunity idol to Goma. Tejan, unknowing of Jacques' imminent exit, arrived afterwards and was informed of the offer made to Jacques, and that the outcome was that Tejan would receive the individual idol, which he could keep secret from his fellow tribemates. Overjoyed with the outcome he didn't expect, Tejan accepted the idol gracefully and kept quiet about it to the rest of Raituhn when he returned to camp as the loser. He saw another benefit to losing the challenge, where he would be seen as a less physical threat by Raituhn, having lost to Jacques in an individual challenge. The Plebs of Raituhn collaborated again to blindside the Celebs, this time Carmel being their target. Informing Carmel and Hykie that Harry would be Tejan's choice, the three remaining Celebs headed into Tribal Council under the belief that the tribe might unify under one banner again. Malusi and Harry saw that voting out Carmel would be tribal suicide, with Malusi noting that if Carmel is blindsided, the other two celebs would be furious with Tejan and they'll never co-operate post-merge. But the original plan went ahead with the celebs voting for Harry under Tejan's suggestion, and Carmel being blindsided by a united Pleb alliance and the 5th person voted out of the game. The fourth Black Cowrie vote was received by Bonnie.
6	"Episode 6"	March 31, 2011
After Tribal Council, Hykie took Tejan aside and expressed his anger about the second blindside that Tejan pulled over the Raituhn Celebs. Tejan explained to him that he needed to get rid of Carmel to destroy any lingering division of Plebs vs. Celebs within their tribe. Day 12 came along with Malusi being on the receiving end of Hykie's frustration from the night before. Malusi also confirmed with the actor that the move was necessary to an extent. Over at Goma, morale was down as Jacques was about to quit. Vanessa and Roxy were especially worried, because their alliance would be down to two when the young musician walked. MXO indicated that he needs to align himself with the Plebs on Goma if he is to stay in the game.: Reward Challenge: The two tribes had to complete a stair puzzle of six pieces, consisting of the Volvo logo. Two at a time, castaways from each tribe had to maneuver the giant puzzle cubes back to the stairs where the puzzle takes place. Once the puzzle is placed correctly, the tribe must all climb up the puzzle and push the lever to release the tribe's flag.; Reward: Pillows, Maldivian couches, hammocks.; After the reward challenge, Goma subtly passed along the information that Jacques parted them with (Tejan obtaining the idol from the last immunity challenge) to the surprised Raituhn castaways without Tejan finding out. Hykie had enough of Tejan's lies and arranged an agreement with fellow Celeb, Bonnie, to go along with Tejan until the opportunity was open to strike a huge blow to the Raituhn Plebs. However, Malusi informed Tejan of the situation that Tejan's playing a fine line now amongst his tribemates and that the idol, which even he did not know about, should be revealed to the entire tribe. Tejan did reveal the idol to the tribe, but the Celebs were already wary of the power player. At Goma, Alison's annoyance of Vanessa grew on Day 13 when she had an emotional moment about her family at home and she felt hi-jacked by Vanessa when she tried to relate about the actress missing her family to the mother of 5.: Immunity Challenge: The tribes must stay on a rope suspended in six divisions on a structure for as long as possible without touching the ground or the structure that suspends the rope. The first tribe to have all its members step off the rope loses. At sunset, the tribes are given the option to both step down for the day, allowing for them to return to their islands. If they both choose to continue into the night, they would all sleep at the challenge.; Roxy felt threatened by the solid alliance that the Goma plebs hold in their tribe. Therefore, she and Vanessa approached Simon to play a double alliance, in order to protect Vanessa and Roxy from being voted off. However, Simon's constant lack of insurance that he could inform the two of his vote at Tribal Council on Day 14, sought for Roxy to retrieve their buried hidden immunity idol. Going into Tribal Council, the atmosphere was that Simon was not able to keep his word to Vanessa, so once the votes were cast and Nico asked if anyone wanted to play the idol, Roxy pulled out the Goma idol, stunning the rest of the tribe, and gave it to Vanessa to play. Her assumption turned out to be correct; the Plebs, including MXO, had voted for Vanessa. Therefore, 5 votes were neglected, leaving Sindi as the unexpected victim of the blindside, and she was the 6th person voted out of the game. Alison received the fifth Black Cowrie vote.
7	"Episode 7"	April 7, 2011
After Tribal Council, Vanessa explained her frustration with the group about her situation. The atmosphere around Goma wasn't great especially for outsiders Vanessa and Roxy, who felt betrayed by Simon and the collapse of their alliance when Jacques quit. At Raituhn, Tejan attempted to confirm with Bonnie and Hykie that the strongest players unite and pick off weak players before they get too far into the game.: Reward Challenge: On a suspended netting platform, the tribes would compete for a wishbone in the middle, initially sending a castaway from each tribe of equivalent strength out for a minute. If neither can score by hanging the wishbone on hooks from the other side of their starting points, one more member of each tribe has to join into the match. After another minute if no point is scored, the point is nullified. The best of five or the majority of points due to nullified points wins reward.; Reward: Live chickens for the tribe to use for their liking.; The reward challenge shook things up for both tribes, with Vanessa wrestling with Bonnie for the wishbone. The District 9 actress had moved her neck back awkwardly and hurt her back, leaving her laying still within the playing arena. When Nico noticed that she wasn't moving, he halted the challenge and called for the medical team to take Vanessa out of the challenge. She informed them that she had injured her neck before, so they evacuated her out of the challenge to x-ray her spine. Raituhn went on to win the challenge afterwards and donated a chicken to Goma with regards to what happened with Vanessa. Nico, however gave the tribes bad news after the challenge; later that night, both tribes will be attending Tribal Council to vote someone off, and there would be no immunity challenge. Returning from the challenge, Roxy knew her days in Goma were numbered if Vanessa was removed from the game. She tried to convince MXO to play a game that was more strategic that just going with the flow, but she got frustrated with him, especially after he joked around with her about breaking the chicken's neck and showing the carcuss to her after what happened with Vanessa. Tejan's new alliance members of Hykie and Bonnie were informed that it was finally Harry's time to go. But as the day drew to a close, Bonnie scrambled to convince Hykie, Letshego and Harry to vote for Malusi, whom she thought was less deserving to reach the merger than Harry. Tribal Council arrived, with both tribes attending at the same time. Both Simon and Tejan suggested that the idea that merger would be prominent real soon, with Tejan using his idol to make sure that he made it to the merge. Vanessa was present at Tribal Council, but sadly at the intervention of the medical team, she was forced to be removed from the game due to the injury to her back. After a brief goodbye, she left the Tribal Council area before the vote. With that, Roxy's fate was sealed as Goma unanimously voted her out of the tribe. Alison received the sixth Black Cowrie vote. Bonnie's efforts to keep Harry in the game failed, and Harry was blindsided by his own alliance and voted out of Raituhn. Bonnie received the seventh Black Cowrie vote.
8	"Episode 8"	April 14, 2011
After the double Tribal Council, Malusi openly confronted the tribe about a lack of unity in the vote. He received an apparently random vote from Bonnie, when the rest of the tribe picked off Harry. Bonnie admitted that she voted for Malusi, leaving him rattled and doubtful about the impending merge. At Goma, Sean noted how, at this situation, Raituhn can pick off the remaining four Goma members off one by one at the merge, to Alison's frustration.: Reward Challenge: Out of the four competing castaways in each tribe, one is selected to pull a rope connected to spinning platform. With a tribemate on top, they must maintain their balance until they have been unwind by the rope. There is a number for an equation hidden by the rope that they must remember, before they continue. Then, they must unwind the next spinning platform, repeating the process. The first runner must head back to the fourth spinning platform, and wait until they are unwound. A balancing beam then awaits them, with mathematical symbols and a number in order on the beam that they must remember. The other side of the course is a puzzle platform where one person in the tribe must assemble the numbers in the right order and the mathematical signs to make the correct equation. The first tribe to make the correct equation wins.; Reward: A personal belonging that they packed for the game and some staple food to take to their new camp, as well as selection rights of which island the merged tribe gets to live on.; After the reward challenge, Nico tempted Raituhn for an island swap after they had lost the reward to Goma. They refused to do so, and the two tribes merged into one under the orange tribal banner, Eku (meaning "Together" in the Maldives' official language, Dhivehi). The new tribe were treated to a merger feast, topping it off with Alison and Bonnie being allowed to remove the Black Cowrie shells, as they were now rendered useless in a single tribe. Bonnie found something placed upon the table that they were feasting while the rest were eating, believing it to be advantageous for her. She hid whatever the item was before anyone could notice; however, Nico arrived and spoiled her secret by requesting for whoever found that item to reveal it. This convinced them that it was not in fact a clue or an idol. She unraveled the item, revealing it as a White Cowrie shell necklace. Nico explained the White Cowrie Shell; it would allow her to negate a vote cast to someone else in the new Eku tribe at any Tribal Council except herself. Whoever she uses the White Cowrie Shell on, will receive it from the actress. At the end of the feast, Nico informed Eku that they would be playing for immunity shortly.: Immunity Challenge: A multiple choice questionnaire on trivia throughout the game so far. With every correct answer, the tribemates can add a rung to their section of the structure. The fifth person to reach the first platform eliminates the last four tribemates. The second person to reach the second platform eliminates the trailing three, leaving it down to a final two's climb to the top of the structure to claim the individual immunity necklace.; With Letshego dominating the immunity challenge, the Raituhn alliance remained in power in Eku with the 5-4 majority. Multiple efforts by MXO and Simon in finding a weak link in Raituhn failed. However, on Day 17, Letshego expressed anger at Malusi about the food situation, for the fact that some castaways ate too much for food that they did not cook. This left Malusi paranoid about his previous secure place in his alliance, feeling like he would be on the bottom once the four Goma members were dealt with. Tribal Council arrived on Day 17, with the introduction of the jury. Harry, Roxy and the injured Vanessa took their place as part of the jury, surprising the Eku tribe. Hykie pointed out that their presence has now sunk in that the game has changed and that his awareness in future votes would be key from now on. Alison felt that she enjoyed Raituhn's island more than her own, but felt like she was just a visitor on their island. Malusi's paranoia revealed itself in front of the tribe when he informed Nico that he felt insecure in the game. Simon even angered Roxy on the jury when he stated to Nico that losing Vanessa was a harsh blow to the former Goma tribemates, reminding Vanessa on the side that they tried to vote her off. Bonnie was informed that she would decide to use the White Cowrie shell when it was her turn to vote. If she used it, she would place the shell into the ballot with a name of whom she gave it to. During the vote, Tejan tried to convince her that he would need the White Cowrie shell tonight, but she returned from her vote with the White Cowrie still around her neck. Malusi stuck with his Raituhn alliance and helped them vote out Simon.
9	"Episode 9"	April 21, 2011
Early in the morning of Day 18, Sean reflected on what was said in Tribal Council the night before about Malusi mentioning that last night's vote was extremely crucial for him. He noticed that Tejan took notice to what his alliance partner said, which let Sean know that there were weak links in the Raituhn 5. MXO, Sean and Alison all started to persuade Malusi into flipping over to side with the former Goma castaways, though all they could manage was to place more doubt on his mind.: Reward Challenge: Marked out within the open area stand 36 poles holding 12 different coloured flags. When Nico reveals a coloured flag at random, the castaways must claim one of the three corresponding flags and take it to the safe zone. For every flag they bring to the safe zone, they score a point. If more than one person takes a flag into the safe zone, the flag is considered void. Deadlocks also cause flags to become void. Once all three flags have been scored, unless a flag became void, that round is over. The castaway with the most points after 10 rounds wins reward.; Reward: A day trip to a luxury spa, allowing two invitees to come along with them.; Tejan won the first individual reward and selected Bonnie to accompany him at the spa. Nico gave Bonnie the option to choose someone as well, and she chose Hykie to join Tejan and herself. At the reward, Tejan cemented what he wanted as a tight four alliance between Bonnie, Hykie, Letshego and himself, as long as their alliance kept on winning the challenges. Hykie however used that time away from the camp to make sure Bonnie was with him and leading Tejan on into thinking that he was running the game.: Immunity Challenge: A three staged continuation challenge. In the first stage, all 8 castaways are attached to individual ropes that lead through a bamboo structure. Once they traverse the structure, they must unharness themselves and cross the line on the other side of the structure. The first five to reach the end are then allowed to continue straight into the next stage. The second stage involves walking across small balancing stumps, where if they fall off, they go back to the start of the stumps. The first three to make it across continue to the third and final stage, where they must dig for a key. Once the key is found, castaways must run towards a locked chest and surface in the water. Inside the chest is a 3D puzzle that they have to deconstruct in the correct manner. The first castaway to successfully solve this puzzle wins immunity.; Before the immunity challenge, treemail arrived with a clue for a new idol placed somewhere at their camp. Most of the tribe went looking for it, with Malusi staying behind at camp. Sean felt that he was on the chopping block before the immunity challenge, as Malusi appeared to not budge from his trust in Tejan. However, he managed to shake things up in camp after coming from behind in the immunity challenge and barely defeating Tejan. This caused Hykie and Bonnie consider voting out Malusi tonight. Tejan, knowing that his alliance wanted to blindside one of their own, felt the need to not involve himself with the decision making. This confused Hykie and Bonnie for a bit, but they stuck to their guns that Malusi should go before he causes a flip. Sean, against what he said earlier to not pressure Malusi into flipping, confirmed with Alison and MXO that Malusi would side with them at Tribal Council on Day 19. Tribal Council arrived with Nico interrogating Eku on the dynamic of the tribe. Alison and Sean still felt that it was Raituhn vs. Goma and that they were going to be picked off one by one. Tejan informed Nico that he felt secure in his alliance and that he could see himself in the Final 5 of the game. Letshego appeared otherwise to Tejan's confidence that no one is sure unless they have Immunity. In the end, the Raituhn 5 turned on their own, blindsiding Malusi. Bonnie transferred the White Cowrie to Hykie, as a safety measure of the event that she might have been voted out that night.
10	"Episode 10"	April 28, 2011
The previous Raituhn alliance was left in ruins with Malusi's exit the previous night. Sean and Alison saw that this was their time to strike at staying in the game. Hykie and Bonnie felt that it was time for Tejan to pay for his pre-merge betrayals from Raituhn, and Tejan stopped talking to Hykie.: Reward Challenge: Survivor Auction; Reward: Ranging from koeksisters and coffee, to chocolate milkshakes. Bonnie brought a secret clue to a hidden immunity idol and Alison won a Volvo V60.; The Survivor Auction arrived, with the girls all receiving some form of reward. Letshego brought koeksisters and coffee. Bonnie brought an envelope which she was allowed to read in private (holding a clue to the new hidden immunity idol). Alison won a new Volvo V60. Tejan spent all his money on a large chocolate milkshake which he had the opportunity to share with everyone else for 60 seconds. Hykie and Sean received nothing at the end of the Auction.: Immunity Challenge: Castaways have to fill a water can suspended on a fulcrum, but there are five leaking holes at the bottom of the can. Inside the fulcrum is a small cannonball. If the castaway fills their water can with enough water, it will tip the cannonball to fall onto a tile and into the water can. The first castaway to tip their fulcrum, and break their plate with the cannonball wins immunity.; After Sean's second immunity win, the two alpha males of Eku (Hykie and Tejan), each tried to convince Alison and Sean about voting out the other. Hykie and Tejan proceeded to argue, only to be interrupted by MXO's presence. Tribal Council arrived and Nico asked Tejan if he still felt comfortable with his place in Eku. Tejan explained that he felt insecure, informing the host that alliances have crumbled with Malusi's exit, subtly highlighting Hykie's strategy of buttering up the jury. Bonnie and Hykie both objected to Tejan's statement that Hykie's behaviour was of ulterior motives, even pointing out that Tejan was the person in the game orchestrating the moves that occurred. Tejan tried to deny the fact that he was calling the shots beforehand, but got pulled down by Bonnie again. At the vote, Hykie returned the White Cowrie to Bonnie. Bonnie used an idol that she found for Hykie, eliminating 3 votes that were cast against the actor. Thus, Tejan was the 11th person voted out of the game with all four valid votes.
11	"Episode 11"	May 5, 2011
Letters from home arrived in boatmail on Day 22, leaving the Final 6 in tears. At the reward challenge, Nico surprised the castaways with their loved ones. The visit was cut short though, due to the reward challenge.: Reward Challenge: The castaways are given coconuts to throw at 6 ceramic pots to release puzzle pieces. Shattering all of their pots allows them to complete a puzzle. The first castaway to complete the puzzle wins reward.; Reward: A braai shared with two castaways and their family members.; Sean's challenge victory meant he had to choose two other people to accompany him with their respective family members, resulting in the other three returning to camp with nothing but a surprise waiting at their camp and no family members. Sticking with old tribal lines, he chose Alison and MXO for the reward. The final three Raituhn members returned to camp, with Letshego finding a hidden immunity idol within one of three bags left at camp. She decided to inform Bonnie and Hykie of this revelation, causing their reuniting of the Raituhn alliance for a Final Three deal. On Day 23, Alison, Sean and MXO noticed that Letshego and Bonnie were suddenly bonding more often, causing fears that the old tribal lines have been drawn again. However, they continued to try swaying Letshego into siding with the old Goma tribemates.: Immunity Challenge: An endurance challenge, where the castaways hang on a suspended beam above the ocean attached to a weight holding a third of their body weight. They may only use their hands and wrists and hold within the red marked areas on the pole. After an hour, the castaways still holding onto the beam must remove one hand permanently. The last castaway left holding onto the beam wins Immunity.; The immunity challenge unknowingly dampered their plans with Hykie outlasting Sean in the end. With Hykie immune, Letshego holding a new idol, and Bonnie holding the White Cowrie with an intention to give it to Hykie if needed, Sean's days were numbered. At Tribal Council, Sean revealed to Nico that he felt insecure without the necklace. MXO pointed out the helplessness because of the two castaways in power, Hykie and Bonnie, referring them as a preacher and preacher's wife. Letshego talked about how the tribe perceived her as the outsider due to her obvious alliance partner, Tejan's, exit at the previous Tribal Council and that she was approached by two members of Eku about siding with them and that they failed to back up with their arguments. Sean responded that it was untrue, but owned up to the fact that he had tried and left her with the choice of informing him about her decision and that she never did. With that, the voting occurred. Hykie gave up his immunity necklace to Bonnie. Bonnie gave her White Cowrie shell to Hykie, and Letshego revealed the new idol, telling the jury and her tribemates about the surprise she received at camp after the reward challenge, and used it for herself. The Goma alliance had voted for Letshego, negating three votes, leaving Sean joining the jury as its seventh member.
12	"Episode 12"	May 12, 2011
Morning on Day 24 was bitter for the entire Eku tribe. Alison felt disgusted with Hykie and Bonnie's confidence in their alliance, Bonnie was hurt by MXO's preacher and preacher's wife comment that he directed to Hykie and herself, and Letshego highlighted that she was the odd one out amongst the Final 5. MXO especially got on Bonnie's nerves during the day.: Reward Challenge: On top of a large platform are hoops for each castaway to shoot colour-marked coconuts. First, they must slide down a long water slide into a water pit. At the end of the water pit lays 20 coconuts for them to shoot with. They must shoot and go back down and up. If they run out of coconuts, they are out of the challenge. First castaway to score 7 coconuts wins the reward.; Reward: A flight to Malé, capital of the Maldives, for a trip in a tourist submarine (an underwater experience with an overnight stay in Malé before returning to the game).; After the close reward challenge (which Hykie won), Hykie openly stated that he wanted to turn down the reward for strategic and pure reasons and give it to Alison and MXO. However, Nico reminded him that he couldn't turn down a reward, so he chose Letshego to accompany him in the reward over his alliance partner, Bonnie. On reward, the two bonded with the knowledge that Hykie's decision to bring Letshego along wasn't entirely because she had never been on reward before. Back at Eku, Alison and MXO figured that Hykie made a great move preventing Letshego from strategizing with the former Goma castaways and decided to leave the stubborn and irritable Bonnie alone from strategy talk.: Immunity Challenge: A floating puzzle that requires that no more than one coloured tile on each variety must be aligned to one another vertically and horizontally. Also, in specially marked zones, there must be no duplicate colours. The first castaway to solve the puzzle correctly wins immunity.; Hykie and Letshego returned at the immunity challenge, with Letshego edging out Alison. This sealed the fate of Alison and MXO as the minority alliance in Eku. When Bonnie and Hykie went off to the camp's resident log, Alison and MXO pushed hard on Letshego, telling her that she will be dropped as soon as Hykie, Bonnie and herself reach the Final 3. However, the former Raituhn remained scarce about her allegiance. At the log, Bonnie stated that she felt Alison should go, as she was perceived as a bigger threat to winning if she made it to the Final Tribal Council. Tribal Council arrived at the end of Day 25, with Alison explaining to Nico her frustration at camp, informing the host that Letshego has become a pivotal point in the game at the end and that she would just be the last person for Bonnie and Hykie to deal with before the Final Tribal Council after revealing herself and MXO as the pecking order. Letshego expressed confidence that she could beat all the Celebs around her in challenges, to Alison's disbelief. With tonight being the last night for the White Cowrie to be in play, Hykie chose not to use it. Letshego stayed loyal to her former Raituhn tribemates, leaving Alison as the eighth jury member.
13	"Episode 13"	May 19, 2011
MXO was the clear target of the Raituhn three. He retrieved treemail for the morning of Day 26, reading it before anyone else. He was shocked to discover that the next challenge was for immunity instead of reward, and he was excited at the prospect of potentially winning the challenge and staying in the game another day.: Immunity Challenge: Castaways must use tools provided to them to build a fire that will burn through their rope, sending a ball into a pot. At this point, they must take a torch out into the water and burn four posts to reveal a four-digit code that will unlock their chest that their flint was attached to. The first two to do this move on to the final stage, where they will repeat the firemaking process. This time, the first to light their torch wins immunity.; Bonnie won immunity over MXO, much to the joy of her, Letshego and Hykie. MXO was frustrated at the loss, comparing the reactions from Hykie and Letshego to being a member of the opposing soccer team at the home team’s arena. In a last-ditch effort to keep himself in the game, MXO bluffed to Bonnie that he had an idol (though Bonnie didn’t believe him), and he even showed in a confessional that it was just a coconut. He later became emotional at the thought of going home after coming so close to the end. At Tribal Council, Nico asked the Raituhn three of their plans beyond voting out MXO, and Hykie admitted he and Bonnie were tighter than anyone else remaining, but all three of them admitted they hadn’t thought about who they could beat more easily. MXO attempted to cause friction within the alliance by asking them about trust, and Letshego told MXO she trusted him less than she trusted Bonnie and Hykie. This led to Hykie realizing that Letshego trusted Bonnie more than she trusted him. Letshego then asked MXO whom he would take to the end if he won final immunity in a scenario where it was him, her and Alison. MXO avoided the question, but Letshego was certain he would’ve taken Alison. The votes were cast and read, and MXO was indeed voted out by the Raituhn three, becoming the ninth member of the jury.: Final Immunity Challenge: Castaways will hang onto a pole in between the two red spots (one on the top and one on the bottom). If they fall off or go too high, they are out of the challenge. The last castaway left on their pole wins immunity and the right to vote out one of the other remaining castaways so that the other one joins them at the Final Tribal Council.; Bonnie dropped out after 20 minutes. The rain made the challenge more difficult, and after nearly three hours, Hykie lost his grip and Letshego won immunity. As Hykie helped an emotional Letshego down, he urged her to “do what is right in her heart.” At camp, neither Bonnie nor Hykie appealed to Letshego, as it was her decision alone. Before the Final Tribal Council, all three paid tribute to their castmates who were eliminated before them. At the Final Tribal Council, Nico and the final 3 discussed the challenge and Letshego’s decision. Ultimately, she decided to take Hykie to the final two with her and send Bonnie to the jury. Over the end credits, viewers were invited to vote for either Hykie or Bonnie to receive a Jury Vote. The finalist with the most votes from the South African public would receive an additional Jury Vote.
14	"Live Finale"	May 26, 2011
The Final Tribal Council commenced immediately following the events of the previous episode. Hykie and Letshego were given an opportunity to give opening statements to the jury. Hykie spent his opening statement praising Letshego and saying he felt like he didn’t deserve to win as opposed to her. Letshego admitted she surprised herself making it this far, as she wasn’t exactly in her element with the outdoors, but that she played hard. Bonnie was the first juror to address the final two; she questioned Letshego over her trust in Tejan despite nobody else trusting him. Letshego replied that she simply believed everything Tejan had told her in the game. Vanessa congratulated the final two before asking Hykie about his bond with Bonnie (whether it was out of friendship or out of necessity). Hykie adamantly said that he trusted Bonnie the most, and when Vanessa asked if he felt like he could beat Bonnie in the end, Hykie sidestepped the question, as Letshego was the only one out of the final three to be guaranteed to plead their case for the victory. Roxy asked for the final two for an impassioned statement detailing why they deserve to win over the other competitor. Hykie said he believed in his actions, while Letshego said she followed her gut. Alison stated her belief that Letshego didn’t play a good social game in that she was under the radar and took the game one day at a time, before asking Letshego how she got to the end; Letshego said it was via the alliances she made. MXO simply asked the final two if they were truly there for the million; Letshego responded “yes,” while Hykie half-jokingly said he would streak in happiness if he won the million. Harry compared Hykie to a camp bully before asking him which of his moves to vote out a castaway to join the jury was his most strategic. Hykie responded Tejan, because he knew Tejan had lied to him and would’ve voted him out. Simon asked Hykie if he wanted to be noble as opposed to the Ultimate Survivor, based on his opening statement; Hykie responded the latter. Malusi questioned Hykie over voting him out to benefit Harry, before telling Hykie his overdramatic responses could only get him in trouble. He asked Letshego about her loyalty to people other than Tejan, and Letshego said she was loyal to an alliance as long as they worked. Tejan praised Hykie’s gameplay but criticized his apparent pretending to be sincere. He asked Letshego over her decision to stick with Bonnie and Hykie. Letshego voiced her distrust in MXO at the final four and said she wanted to challenge herself against people she thought she could trust better. Finally, Sean interrogated Hykie on his gameplay. At the live finale, the castaways reunited to discuss the season. Before the jury votes were read, it was revealed that the public got to vote for either Hykie or Letshego, which would give them an extra vote counted at the finale. Hykie got the public vote, and the jury's final tally was 7-3 in favor of Hykie. Thus, Hykie was named the Ultimate Survivor over Letshego in an 8-3 decision. Simon, Malusi, and Alison were the only jury members to vote for Letshego.

== Voting history ==
	Plebs (Note: For the first round, the Plebs and Celebs played separately. Only the Plebs participated in the Immunity Challenge, with the Blue Pleb team (who would later comprise the Goma tribe) being the only castaways participating in the first Tribal Council.)	Black Cowrie (Note: On Day 4, the tribes were officially formed. After the first Reward Challenge, the tribes participated in a first impression vote, with each castaway voting for a tribe mate they believed would not be the "Ultimate Survivor". Those voted against would receive the Black Cowrie Shell. The Black Cowrie Shell gives the holder a penalty vote at every tribal council they attend. However, the shell also has power - both to give the shell to another tribe-mate upon the holder's elimination and to mutiny to the other tribe to cancel the penalty vote. The Black Cowries were in play during the Tribal Phase of the game and were taken out of play at the Merge.)		Original tribes									Merged tribe						
Episode	1	2			3	4	5	6		7			8	9	10	11	12	13	
Day	3	4		5	7	9	11	12	14	15			17	19	21	23	25	26	27
Eliminated	Lukhanyo	Tasleem	Alison	Philicity	Tsepho	Tasleem	Carmel	Jacques	Sindi	Vanessa	Roxy	Harry	Simon	Malusi	Tejan	Sean	Alison	MXO	Bonnie
Votes	3–2	5–4	4–2–2–1	5–2–2–1	5–4–1	8–1	4–3–1	Quit (Note: Jacques quit the game.)	2–1–0 (Note: Roxy played a hidden immunity idol on Vanessa, therefore five votes against her were not counted.)	Evacuated (Note: Vanessa was medically evacuated from the game.)	4–1–1	4–1–1–1	5–4	4–2–1–1	4–0 (Note: Hykie played a hidden immunity idol on himself, therefore three votes against him were not counted.)	3–0 (Note: Letshego played a hidden immunity idol on herself, therefore three votes against her were not counted.)	3–2	3–1	1–0
Voter	Vote																		
Hykie		Harry			Harry	Tasleem	Harry					Harry	Simon	Malusi	Tejan	Sean	Alison	MXO	None (Note: Bonnie and Hykie were not eligible to vote as the only eligible players they could vote for were each other.)
Letshego		Harry			Tsepho	Tasleem	Carmel					Harry	Simon	Malusi	~~Hykie~~	Sean	Alison	MXO	Bonnie
Bonnie		Tasleem			Harry	Tasleem	Harry					Malusi	Simon	Malusi	Tejan	Sean	Alison	MXO	None
MXO			Sean	Philicity					~~Vanessa~~		Roxy		Tejan	Letshego	Tejan	~~Letshego~~	Hykie	Hykie	
Alison	Lukhanyo		MXO	Jacques					~~Vanessa~~		Roxy		Tejan	Bonnie	~~Hykie~~	~~Letshego~~	Hykie		
Sean	Lukhanyo		MXO	Philicity					~~Vanessa~~		Roxy		Tejan	Bonnie	Tejan	~~Letshego~~			
Tejan		Tasleem			Tsepho	Tasleem	Carmel					Harry	Simon	Malusi	~~Hykie~~				
Malusi		Tasleem			Tsepho	Tasleem	Carmel					Harry	Simon	MXO					
Simon	Lukhanyo		Philicity	Jacques					~~Vanessa~~		Roxy		Tejan						
Harry		Tasleem			Tsepho	Tasleem	Carmel					Hykie							
Roxy			Alison	Philicity					Sindi		MXO								
Vanessa			Alison	Philicity					Sindi										
Sindi	Sean		Philicity	Roxy					~~Vanessa~~										
Jacques			Alison	Philicity															
Carmel		Harry			Harry	Tasleem	Harry												
Tasleem		Harry			Tsepho	Bonnie													
Tsepho		Tasleem			Harry														
Philicity			Alison	Roxy															
Lukhanyo	Sean																		
Black cowrie				Alison	Tasleem	Tasleem	Bonnie		Alison		Alison	Bonnie							
White cowrie (Note: The white cowrie holder could play it at Tribal Council to negate one vote against another tribe member; doing so would transfer it to the castaway it was played on.)													Not Used	Hykie	Bonnie	Hykie	Not Used		

Jury Vote
Episode	14	
Day	27	
Finalist	Letshego	Hykie
Votes	8–3	
Juror	Vote	
Bonnie		Hykie
MXO		Hykie
Alison	Letshego	
Sean		Hykie
Tejan		Hykie
Malusi	Letshego	
Simon	Letshego	
Harry		Hykie
Roxy		Hykie
Vanessa		Hykie
South Africa (Note: The South African public were given the opportunity to vote between which of the two finalists they wanted to win the game; the finalist with the most votes received one jury vote.)		Hykie
