= Peter Krummeck =

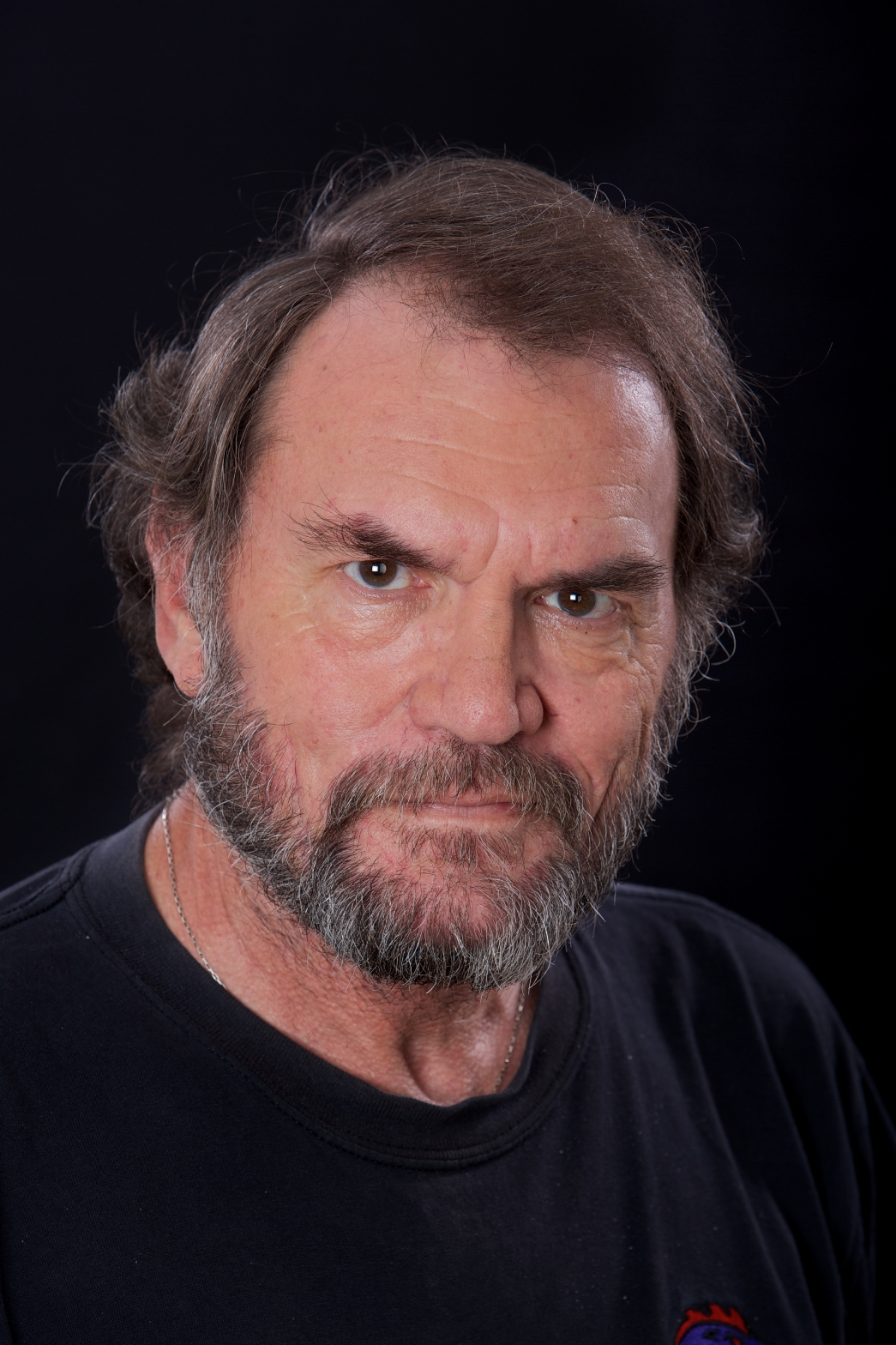
- Born: Peter Alan Krummeck; 4 March 1947; Johannesburg
- Died: 9 November 2013 (aged 66)
- Occupations: actor, theatre designer, director, writer, teacher, and activist
- Notable work: The Emissary

Peter Alan Krummeck (4 March 1947 - 9 November 2013) was a South African actor, theatre designer, director, writer, teacher, and activist, who won renown beyond South Africa in his one-man play Bonhoeffer. Pioneering the use of drama as a tool for reconciliation, he founded the African Community Theatre Service with Archbishop Desmond Tutu as patron.

== Early life and education ==
Krummeck was born in Johannesburg. He studied graphic design in East London, South Africa, and he achieved the National Diploma in Graphic Design with distinction in 1967. He was appointed studio manager at the Daily Dispatch newspaper in East London, under the editorship of Donald Woods, before moving to Cape Town in 1969.

== A career in theatre and film ==
Krummeck’s theatre career in Cape Town, spanning more than four decades, included a lectureship at the Drama Department at the University of Cape Town in 1974-6, where he devised modules in stagecraft and design.

In 1973 he appeared in the title role in a translation of P.G. du Plessis’ Plaston: DNS-kind, and he went on some years later to translate du Plessis’ Siener in die Suburbs (as Seer in the Suburbs). Pre-eminently for CAPAB, at Artscape, but also in other contexts such as Maynardville, and at the Baxter Theatre, Krummeck worked as an actor, director, producer, and writer. He was much involved at the Baxter Theatre from its earliest days, being responsible for the architect’s model prior to its construction. He produced several of his own plays there, including The Evening of our Time, a searing examination of the moral dilemma of whether to leave South Africa or stay at the height of apartheid.

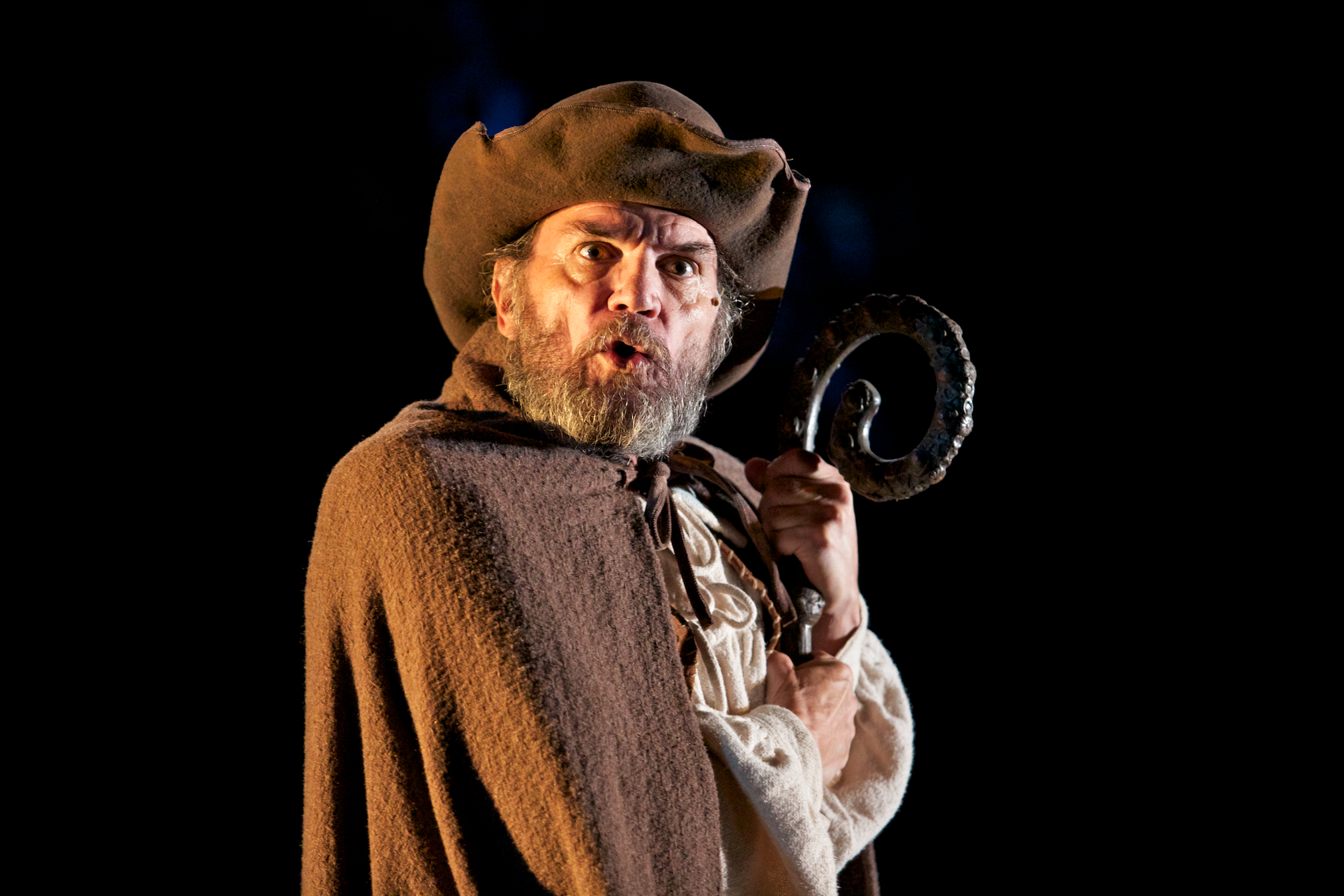
Peter Krummeck performing in Shakespeare's "Cardenio."

He founded the company, Compass Productions, and, subsequently, the African Community Theatre Service (ACTS), in order to undertake work in reconciliation. Under Archbishop Desmond Tutu's mentorship he worked as a lay-minister in the Anglican Church from the mid-1980s, being associated with the parishes of St John's in Wynberg and St Paul's in Rondebosch - though latterly with the Rondebosch United Church. Under the banner of ACTS, he wrote and directed The Passion and a nativity play, Lodestar.

In addition to being an acclaimed stage actor and theatre designer in major productions, Krummeck was active as a playwright for radio productions on SAfm in South Africa, and appeared in film and television, notably the screen adaptation of Mandela: Long Walk to Freedom starring Idris Elba. Shortly before his death, he completed a radio dramatisation called A Lessons from Aloes, on the history of mission schools in South Africa, and their revival in a project headed by Archbishop Njongonkulu Ndungane.

Krummeck was artist in residence at St Mark’s Church, Washington D.C. in 2002 and, while there, workshopped a programme for the first anniversary of 9/11, including his one man play Bonhoeffer. Based on the life and witness of the German pastor, theologian, and dissident anti-Nazi, Dietrich Bonhoeffer, the play toured in South Africa, the United States, and Canada, where it was televised.

Concerned with issues of gender characterisation and discrimination, Krummeck explored these themes on stage and camera, and in published texts. With encouragement from Archbishop Desmond Tutu, he wrote a guide to gender relationships for the parish of St John’s, Wynberg. His 1994 teleplay Dear and Awkward Courage, directed by Tamara Semevsky, was the first work openly to address the gay issue on South African television, while his award-winning HIV/Aids play iVirgin Boy dealt with themes of male rape and bisexuality. His two novellas, published as Adam & Luke, were reissued by Junkets Publisher as part of their 10th anniversary series.

== Final illness and death ==
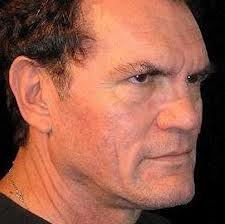
Peter Krummeck

Krummeck died at St. Luke's Hospice in Cape Town on Saturday, November 9, 2013, six months after being diagnosed with cancer.

== Filmography ==
Year	Title	Role	Notes
1986	You Gotta Be Crazy!		
1986	Dada en die Flower	Captain Anderson	
1988	The Emissary	Doctor	
1988	Rage to Kill	Soldier in Jeep	Uncredited
1989	Jewel of the Gods	SS Guard	
1990	That Englishwoman: An Account of the Life of Emily Hobhouse	Lieut. Baker	
1998	Ernest in the Army	Businessman	
1999	After the Rain	Minister	
2002	The Piano Player	Alex's Father	
2003	Citizen Verdict	Prison official	
2013	Mandela: Long Walk to Freedom	Magistrate	(final film role)
