= Parish (TV series) =

Crime drama television series

- Genre: Crime drama
- Created by: Danny Brocklehurst
- Based on: The Driver by: Danny Brocklehurst; & Jim Poyser
- Developed by: Danny Brocklehurst; Sunu Gonera
- Starring: Giancarlo Esposito; Zackary Momoh; Paula Malcomson; Skeet Ulrich; Ivan Mbakop; Bonnie Mbuli; Arica Himmel; Dax Rey
- Country of origin: United States
- Original language: English
- No. of seasons: 1
- No. of episodes: 6

Production
- Executive producers: Eduardo Javier Canto; Ryan Maldonado; Giancarlo Esposito; Theo Travers; Barry Jossen; Tana Jamieson; Josh Kesselman; Danny Sherman; Danny Brocklehurst; David Morrissey; Nicola Shindler; Jim Poyser; Jolyon Symonds
- Producer: Chris Cheramie
- Production companies: Thruline Entertainment; A+E Studios; AMC Studios

Original release
- Network: AMC
- Release: March 31 – May 5, 2024

Parish is an American crime drama television series developed by Danny Brocklehurst and based on his BBC One series The Driver. Starring Giancarlo Esposito, it premiered on AMC on March 31, 2024. In October 2024, the series was cancelled after one season.

== Premise ==
Gray Parish, a good man with a troubled past, has given up his life of crime to be a family man running a limousine service. A year ago his son was violently murdered. With his business struggling financially, Parish is drawn back into his old life, sending him on a relentless quest with moral intentions and dangerous consequences.

== Cast and characters ==
=== Main ===
- Giancarlo Esposito as Gracián "Gray" Parish
- Zackary Momoh as Shepherd Tonghai / The Horse
- Paula Malcomson as Rose Parish
- Skeet Ulrich as Colin Broussard
- Ivan Mbakop as Zenzo Tongai
- Bonnie Mbuli as Shamiso Tongai
- Arica Himmel as Makayla Parish
- Dax Rey as Luke Tongai

=== Recurring ===
- Amanda Brugel as Sister Anne
- Caleb Baumann as Maddox Parish
- Currie Graham as Perry Lousteau
- Sam Malone as Detective Doucet
- Bradley Whitford as Anton Valmont

=== Guest ===
- Ned Yousef as Amjad
- Scott Poythress as Peter Nguyen
- Leydi Morales as Detective Rita Fuentes
- Nicholas Logan as Wyatt
- Jennifer Lafleur as Sarah
- Bruce Altman as Vernon Beal
- Enuka Okuma as Laura Abidemi-Smith
- Tanyell Waivers as Nyasha Mambo
- Yul Vazquez as Hector
- Patrick Heusinger as Travis
- Isaach de Bankolé as "Baba" Tongai

== Production ==
It was announced on March 8, 2022, that a television series adaptation of the BBC One series, The Driver, was in development, with Giancarlo Esposito starring as Vince. On June 23, 2022, it was announced that Paula Malcomson had joined the cast as Ros. In July, it was announced that Arica Himmel, Ivan Mbakop, Zackary Momo and Dax Rey had joined the cast as Michaela, Zenzo, the Horse and Luke, respectively. In August, it was announced that Bonnie Mbuli and Skeet Ulrich had joined the cast as Shamiso Tongai and Colin, respectively. In September 2022, it was announced that Bradley Whitford had joined the cast as Anton. The same article confirmed that the name of Esposito's protagonist had changed from Vince to Gracian "Gray" Parish.

The series was created by Danny Brocklehurst, Sunu Gonera and Theo Travers and was executive produced by Brocklehurst, Esposito, Gonera and Travers, alongside Josh Kesselman, David Morrissey and Danny Sherman. Filming began in early August 2022 in New Orleans. That same month the title for the series was announced to be Parish. In October 2022, it was reported that Gonera was removed from the series following an internal investigation against him. On November 13, 2023, Deadline.com debuted the series teaser trailer and "first look" photos; the accompanying article identified Executive Producers Eduardo Javier Canto and Ryan Maldonado as the new series showrunners.

On October 17, 2024, the series was cancelled after one season.

== Episodes ==
| No. | Title | Directed by | Written by | Original release date | U.S. viewers (millions) |
|---|---|---|---|---|---|
| 1 | "Pilot" | Sunu Gonera | Teleplay by : Danny Brocklehurst & Sunu Gonera and Theo Travers | March 31, 2024 | 0.49 |
| 2 | "Blood in the Water" | Sunu Gonera | Theo Travers and Eduardo Javier Canto & Ryan Maldonado | April 7, 2024 | 0.34 |
| 3 | "Sanctuary" | Laura Belsey | Ashley Cardiff and Theo Travers | April 14, 2024 | 0.30 |
| 4 | "Impimpi" | Laura Belsey | J. David Shanks & Matt Wheeler | April 21, 2024 | 0.30 |
| 5 | "Kumba" | Ernest Dickerson | Story by : Eduardo Javier Canto & Ryan Maldonado and Cori Uchida & Adam Lash; Teleplay by : Eduardo Javier Canto & Ryan Maldonado & Sunu Gonera and Theo Travers | April 28, 2024 | 0.25 |
| 6 | "A Good Man" | Karen Gaviola | Story by : Eduardo Javier Canto & Ryan Maldonado; Teleplay by : Theo Travers & Hanna McIntosh | May 5, 2024 | 0.23 |

== Reception ==
The review aggregator Rotten Tomatoes reported a 36% approval rating, based on 22 critic reviews. Metacritic assigned it a score of 52 out of 100, based on 15 critics, indicating "mixed or average reviews". Aramide Tinubu of Variety criticized the series as being "predictable" in its writing, and said, "When everything finally clicks in place during the series' final episode, 'A Good Man,' it feels so convenient, it's anticlimactic." Daniel Fienberg of The Hollywood Reporter complimented Esposito and the action, but also criticized the writing and depiction of New Orleans.
