= Hykie Berg =

South African actor

- Born: Hykie Berg; May 2, 1978 (age 48); Pretoria, South Africa
- Education: Hoërskool Die Wilgers
- Alma mater: University of Pretoria; Stellenbosch University
- Occupations: Actor, author, M.C., motivational speaker, presenter
- Years active: 2003–present
- Website: https://hykieberg.com

Hykie Berg (born 2 May 1978), is a South African actor. He is best known for the role of 'Darius du Buisson' in the television serial Egoli: Place of Gold and role 'Conrad Bester' in the soap opera, Binnelanders. In 2011, he won the fourth season of the reality competition Survivor South Africa.

== Personal life ==
He was born on 2 May 1978 in Pretoria, South Africa. He studied up to grade 8 at Hoërskool Die Wilgers where he started using drugs. Then he matriculated in 1996. At the age of 19, he became a heroin addict. He then received drug rehabilitation within a maximum-security cell at the Weskoppies Psychiatric Hospital, Pretoria.

From 1997 and 1999, he completed a Bachelor of Commerce in Marketing – Second Year, Marketing/Marketing Management General degree at University of Pretoria. Then he graduated with a Bachelor's degree in Dramatic Arts in Arts, Entertainment, and Media Management from Stellenbosch University between 1999 and 2002.

He was previously married to Melissa Jacobs in 2013 but divorced in 2018. He then proposed to his girlfriend Gerridene on 23 June 2019 and they married in March 2020.

== Career ==
He made his television debut in the popular youth series The Res in 2003. Then in 2004, he made a starring role in the serial Plek van Meats. In 2007, he played his first film role in Ouma se Slim Kind. In 2004, he joined the cast of the season 13 of the television serial Egoli: Place of Gold and played the role 'Darius du Buisson' in which he won a Crystal Award. He played the role for three seasons up to season 15 in 2007.

In 2018, he became an author where he published the book Hykie Berg: Ultimate Survivor. The book deals with his drug addict life and near death at his peak in acting career, where he finally manages to rehabilitate and achieve the success after.

== Filmography ==
Year	Film	Role	Genre	Ref.
2004	Plek van die Vleisvreters	Rudolph du Toit	TV series	
2007	Ouma se Slim Kind	Steyn Struwig	Film	
2007	One Way	Frank	TV series	
2012	Lien se Lankstaanskoene	Dominee Gerhard	Film	
2012	Pretville	Tommie	Film	
2013	Klein Karoo	Meyer Labuschagne	Film	
2015	Mooirivier	Stefan Malan	Film	
2015	Forsaken	Neill	Film	
2015	Dis ek, Anna	Marnus Retief	Film	
2015	Verskietende Ster	Tomas Schuman	Film	
2015	Bloedbroers	Bennie Naudé	TV series	
2009–present	Binnelanders	Conrad Bester	TV series	
2016	Die Geur van Appelkose	Anton	TV movie	
2018	Die Ongenooides	Dirk	Short film	
