= Survivor South Africa: Immunity Island =

Eighth season of Survivor South Africa

- Season 8
- Presented by: Nico Panagio
- No. of days: 39
- No. of castaways: 20
- Winner: Nicole Wilmans
- Runner-up: Anela Majozi
- Location: Wild Coast, Eastern Cape, South Africa
- No. of episodes: 16

Release
- Original network: M-Net
- Original release: 3 June – 16 September 2021

Additional information
- Filming dates: 6 November – 14 December 2020

Season chronology
- ← Previous; Island of Secrets Next → Return of the Outcasts

Survivor South Africa: Immunity Island is the eighth season of the South African reality competition show, Survivor South Africa. Before the arrival of the COVID-19 pandemic in South Africa, this would have been the first time in the show's history that a third season ordered by M-Net would have aired in back-to-back years. Originally shelved due to budget and broadcast scheduling after the end of the seventh season, the show's social media announced a Season 8 audition call on 8 December 2019. Applications were open from then until 20 January 2020, with the season airing in the second half of 2020. Immunity Island was the sixth season hosted by Nico Panagio and was produced by Afrokaans Film & Television.

Production was initially set to take place from March to May 2020; however, M-Net and Afrokaans had to reassess the season's location and timeline for filming due to the COVID-19 pandemic potentially putting the production and full cast at risk of exposure. Series director Leroux Botha assured fans that Afrokaans were making a plan to navigate the pandemic. On 16 April 2020, M-Net announced that the season would be postponed indefinitely as a result of the global measures in preventing the spread of the COVID-19 pandemic. To ensure the safety of the film production, crew and contestants that had been cast, M-Net felt the need to halt production before it began. On December 17, Afrokaans and M-Net announced that they managed to finish filming a season locally in South Africa, with a following announcement on December 20 that the season was filmed in the Wild Coast region of the Eastern Cape, with a premiere date set for 3 June 2021. The season concluded with a pre-recorded finale and reunion which aired on September 16, 2021, when Nicole Wilmans was crowned Sole Survivor over Anela Majozi by a vote of 8–1.

== Immunity Island ==
This season introduced Immunity Island, similar to the titular Island of Secrets in the previous season. The winners of the immunity challenge would select one castaway to be exiled on Immunity Island, granting that person the immunity island necklace for the upcoming Tribal Council. The exiled castaway would then be given two options:

- Stay and Play: In which the exiled player would participate in a solo challenge for an advantage offered. Succeeding in the challenge would award the player with the advantage while failing would give the player a disadvantage in the game. Additionally, while the exiled player is immune from elimination (by virtue of the Immunity Island Necklace), they are not able to vote in that night's Tribal Council. They returned to the tribe during the Tribal Council.
- Give Up and Go: In which the exiled player would immediately return to their tribe. While they can participate in the Tribal Council (being able to strategise with their tribe before the council and cast a vote), they may not hold the Island Necklace at the Tribal Council. However, they do have the option of bequeathing their immunity island necklace to one of their tribemates at the Tribal Council, making their selection immune.

== Contestants ==
The cast is composed of 20 players divided into two tribes, Vuna and Zamba, based on a random draw. Day 7 saw the tribes partake in a random draw shuffle. The tribes swapped yet again on Day 15. The two tribes merged on Day 19 as the Osindile tribe.

List of Survivor South Africa: Immunity Island contestants
Contestant	Original Tribe	First Swapped Tribes	Second Swapped Tribes	Merged Tribe	Tied Destiny	Finish
Jason Brookstein; 27, Johannesburg, Gauteng	Zamba					1st voted out Day 3
Noleen "Pinty" Nkanjeni; 30, Cape Town, Western Cape	Vuna					2nd voted out Day 6
Mike Laws; 32, Cape Town, Western Cape	Vuna	Zamba				3rd voted out Day 8
Paul Cupido; 29, Johannesburg, Gauteng	Vuna	Zamba				4th voted out Day 11
Thoriso M-Afrika; 36, Kariega, Eastern Cape	Zamba	Vuna				5th voted out Day 13
Carla Gubb; 29, Cape Town, Western Cape	Vuna	Zamba				6th voted out Day 13
Dino Paulo; 30, Johannesburg, Gauteng	Zamba	Vuna	Zamba			7th voted out Day 16
Qieän Wang; 35, Cape Town, Western Cape & Hong Kong, PRC	Zamba	Vuna	Zamba			8th voted out Day 18
Marisha du Plessis; 35, Tulbagh, Western Cape	Zamba	Vuna	Vuna	Osindile		9th voted out 1st jury member Day 21
Shaun Wilson; 40, Cape Town, Western Cape	Zamba	Zamba	Vuna	Osindile		10th voted out 2nd jury member Day 23
Renier Louwrens; 30, Secunda, Mpumalanga	Zamba	Vuna	Vuna	Osindile	Amy	11th voted out 3rd jury member Day 26
Amy Eliason; 33, Johannesburg, Gauteng	Zamba	Zamba	Vuna	Osindile	Renier	Tied Destiny (Note: Day 24 introduced the Tied Destinies twist. The castaways were paired up until the next Tribal Council. Whoever won the Immunity challenge, their partner would become immune as well. Whoever was voted out, their partner would be eliminated with them. Renier was voted out at Tribal Council on Day 26, and as Amy was his partner, she was eliminated along with him.); 4th jury member Day 26
Anesu Mbizvo; 29, Johannesburg, Gauteng	Vuna	Vuna	Vuna	Osindile	Kiran	12th voted out 5th jury member Day 28
Wardah Hartley; 39, Johannesburg, Gauteng	Vuna	Zamba	Zamba	Osindile	Tyson	13th voted out ~~6th jury member~~ (Note: On Day 37, as part of his reward for winning the challenge on Day 36, Chappies also earned the power to eliminate one of the jurors. He chose Wardah.); Day 30
Santoni Engelbrecht; 39, Strand, Western Cape	Vuna	Zamba	Zamba	Osindile	Chappies	Eliminated (Note: Nicole played a Fire Idol at Tribal Council on Day 33. When used, a Fire Idol forces the two highest receivers of votes to compete in a Fire-making challenge to remain in the game. Santoni and Tyson received the highest number of votes, with Santoni losing the challenge.); 7th jury member Day 33
Kiran Naidoo; 29, Johannesburg, Gauteng	Vuna	Vuna	Zamba	Osindile	Anesu	14th voted out 8th jury member Day 35
Tyson Zulu; 24, Johannesburg, Gauteng	Vuna	Vuna	Zamba	Osindile	Wardah	15th voted out 9th jury member Day 37
Francois "Chappies" Chapman; 32, Centurion, Gauteng	Vuna	Zamba	Vuna	Osindile	Santoni	16th voted out 10th jury member Day 38
Anela Majozi; 25, Durban, Kwa Zulu Natal	Zamba	Zamba	Zamba	Osindile	Nicole	Runner-Up; Day 39
Nicole Wilmans; 26, Somerset West, Western Cape	Zamba	Vuna	Vuna	Osindile	Anela	Ultimate Survivor; Day 39

=== Future appearances ===
Dino Paulo, Francois 'Chappies' Chapman, Noleen 'Pinty' Nkanjeni and Thoriso M-Afrika competed again in Survivor South Africa: Return of the Outcasts in 2022.

== Season summary ==
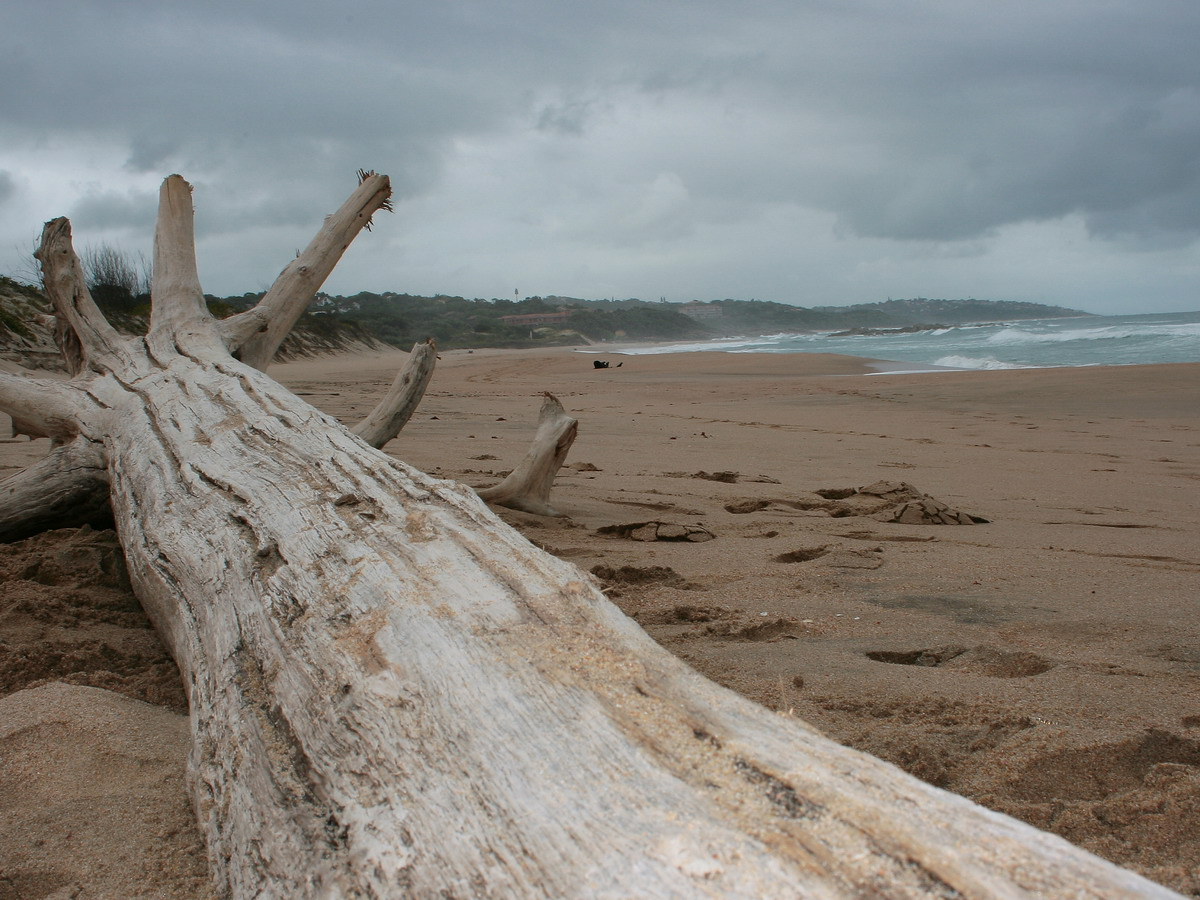
The season was filmed in the Wild Coast Region of the Eastern Cape.

The game began on home soil, with two tribes of 10, the green Zamba, and the orange Vuna. Both tribes saw solid majorities form over the first few days, until an early blindside left Chappies alienated by Vuna led by a majority formed around Anesu, Kiran, Tyson and Wardah. An early tribe swap to Zamba saw Chappies and Santoni aligned with Anela and the original Zamba to get revenge on Wardah's allies, until a second swap saw the Vuna trio of Kiran, Tyson, and Wardah take control over a weakening Zamba tribe in order to target Chappies at the merge.

The merge of the blue Osindile tribe saw alliances split between original tribal lines. While Anela and the Zamba alliance used a vote steal advantage against Chappies to have a vote majority, the Vuna trio decided to save Chappies with an idol to secure a numbers majority over the united Zamba alliance. The Vuna 6 continued to pick off the Zamba alliance, including during a Tied Destinies twist which saw the tribe partnered up with their fates tied for one round in the game. This left Anela and Nicole as the last remaining Zamba against a strong Vuna 6 led by Kiran and Tyson.

The Vuna 6, however could not remain united as the core trio of Kiran, Tyson, and Wardah approached Anela and Nicole to target social threat, Anesu, and physical threat, Chappies. Chappies went on a record-tying immunity challenge winning streak to derail the dominant trio's plans. At Final 6, Anela attempted to formulate a blindside against the strategically dominant Kiran, but backed out at the last minute when he revealed his own plans to Kiran. The blunder left Anela stuck with switching allegiances over to Chappies and his challenge dominance as a shield to remain in the game. Eventually after numerous challenges, Nicole finally managed to beat Chappies in the Final Three Immunity Challenge, leading to her bringing her fellow Zamba ally to the Final Tribal Council.

The Final Tribal Council saw the jury urge Nicole to explain her quieter game throughout the season, despite her never-give-up attitude in challenges against the more-successful Chappies, while also trying to understand Anela's socially strong, yet strategically weak gameplay. The votes revealed that the jury felt they could understand her consistent and subtle gameplay over Anela's massive strategic blunders, awarding Nicole the victory and the title of Sole Survivor.

Challenge winners and eliminations by episode
Episode			Challenge winner(s)		Immunity Island			Eliminated	Finish
No.	Title	Air date	Reward	Immunity	Immune	Scenario	Result	Eliminated	Finish
1	"Nothing Unites Like a Common Enemy"	June 3, 2021	Zamba (Note: Both tribes won supplies in the reward challenge. The tribe listed as winning won the main reward item awarded during that challenge.)	Vuna	Thoriso	Idol Clue	Lost	Jason	1st voted out Day 3
1	"Nothing Unites Like a Common Enemy"	June 3, 2021	Vuna	Dino (Note: Dino won individual immunity for his first Tribal Council in the reward challenge.)	Thoriso	Idol Clue	Lost	Jason	1st voted out Day 3
2	"I Can Go 'Bos'... No Pun!"	June 10, 2021	Zamba	Zamba	Santoni	Idol Clue	Won	Pinty	2nd voted out Day 6
3	"Always Be Closing"	June 17, 2021	Zamba	Vuna	Amy	Tribe Raid	Lost	Mike	3rd voted out Day 8
4	"Gloat or Vote"	June 24, 2021	Vuna	Vuna	~~Carla~~	N/A	Refused (Note: Carla chose to Give Up and Go, choosing to keep her vote and give up Immunity for herself, instead of partaking in the Immunity Island challenge.)	Paul	4th voted out Day 11
5	"Collateral Damage"	July 1, 2021	Vuna	None	Anesu (Note: As both Tribes were attending Tribal Council, the castaways could compete for tribal reward or a trip to Immunity Island. Anesu won the trip to Immunity Island.)	Tribal Council; Pass	Won	Thoriso	5th voted out Day 13
5	"Collateral Damage"	July 1, 2021	Vuna	None	Anesu	Tribal Council; Pass	Won	Carla	6th voted out Day 13
6	"Control the Flow"	July 8, 2021	Vuna	Vuna	Anela	Extra Vote	Lost	Dino	7th voted out Day 16
7	"Look Behind You"	July 15, 2021	Vuna (Note: Combined reward and immunity challenge.)		Anela	Reward, Vote Steal	Won (Note: Anela was told that to "Stay and Play" would not involve a game, but rather playing a video from his loved ones. He played the video, which also revealed that he had received the Mexican feast reward as well as a Vote Steal Advantage.)	Qieän	8th voted out Day 18
8	"Here for a Good Time"	July 22, 2021	None (Note: There was no Reward challenge due to the Merge.)	Kiran	~~Tyson~~, Wardah	N/A	Refused (Note: Tyson chose to Give Up and Go, choosing to keep his vote and give up Immunity for himself, instead of partaking in the Immunity Island challenge. He bequeathed Immunity onto Wardah.)	Marisha	9th voted out 1st jury member Day 21
9	"A Deal with the Devil"	July 29, 2021	Amy, Chappies, Renier, Tyson, Wardah [Santoni (Note: Santoni lost a draw to participate in the challenge, however, she correctly predicted the winning team and joined them on the reward.)]	Kiran	~~Wardah~~, Tyson	N/A	Refused (Note: Wardah chose to Give Up and Go, choosing to keep her vote and give up Immunity for herself, instead of partaking in the Immunity Island challenge. She bequeathed Immunity onto Tyson.)	Shaun	10th voted out 2nd jury member Day 23
10	"Tied Destinies"	August 5, 2021	Nicole & Anela [Amy & Renier] (Note: Combined reward and immunity challenge. The Tied Destiny Twist granted Anela immunity for being paired with Nicole.)		N/A (Note: With the Tied Destiny twist granting two Immunities on Day 25, no one would be sent to Immunity Island during the Twist.)			Renier	11th Voted Out; 3rd Jury Member; Day 26
10	"Tied Destinies"	August 5, 2021	Nicole & Anela [Amy & Renier]		N/A			Amy	Tied Destiny (Note: The rules of the Tied Destiny twist stated that whoever is voted out at Tribal Council on Day 26, their partner would be eliminated with them. Renier received the majority vote, eliminating himself and his partner, Amy by association); 4rd Jury Member; Day 26
11	"Brownie Points Are Everything"	August 12, 2021	Chappies, Nicole, Tyson, Wardah	Chappies	Santoni	Fire Idol; Advantage	Lost	Anesu	12th Voted Out; 5th Jury Member; Day 28
12	"All in a Day's Work"	August 19, 2021	Survivor; Auction	Chappies	Nicole	Fire Idol; Advantage	Won	Wardah	13th Voted Out; ~~6th Jury Member~~ (Note: On Day 37, as part of his reward for winning the challenge on Day 36, Chappies also earned the power to eliminate one of the jurors. He chose Wardah.); Day 30
13	"A Very Weird Vibe"	August 26, 2021	Chappies	Chappies	None (Note: On Day 32, Nico announced to the castaways that no-one will be exiled to Immunity Island anymore for the remainder of the season.)			Santoni	Eliminated (Note: On Day 33, Nicole played a Fire Idol at Tribal Council before the vote. A Fire Idol played forces the two castaways with the two highest number of votes into a Fire-making challenge to remain in the game. Santoni and Tyson received the most votes respectively, where Santoni lost the duel against Tyson and was eliminated from the game.); 7th Jury Member; Day 33
14	"A Sour Taste in the Mouth"	September 2, 2021	Chappies [Anela]	Chappies	None			Kiran	14th Voted Out; 8th Jury Member; Day 35
15	"The Fruits of Your Labour"	September 9, 2021	Chappies		None			Tyson	15th Voted Out; 9th Jury Member; Day 37
16	"The Final Decision" and Immunity Island Reunion	September 16, 2021	None	Nicole	None			Chappies	16th Voted Out; 10th Jury Member; Day 38
16	"The Final Decision" and Immunity Island Reunion	September 16, 2021						Jury vote	
16	"The Final Decision" and Immunity Island Reunion	September 16, 2021						Anela	Runner-up; Day 39
16	"The Final Decision" and Immunity Island Reunion	September 16, 2021						Nicole	Sole Survivor; Day 39

In the case of multiple tribes or castaways who win reward or immunity, they are listed in order of finish, or alphabetically where it was a team effort; where one castaway won and invited others, the invitees are in brackets.

== Episodes ==
No. overall	No. in season	Title	Timeline	Original release date
108	1	"Nothing Unites like a Common Enemy"	Day 1-3	June 3, 2021
Arriving in the Wild Coast, the castaways took part in a random draw to select the two tribes, Vuna and Zamba.: Marooning Challenge: The two tribes were given 2 minutes to grab as many supplies as they can and place it on their tribe mats. At the end of the challenge hung two individual immunity necklaces, one for each tribe. Any castaway who grabbed a necklace would be immune at their first Tribal Council. A hidden Tribe Advantage discovered gave the castaway's tribe camping supplies to go with their winnings.; Dino managed to grabbed the Zamba necklace, with Renier reluctantly revealing he found the Tribe Advantage, winning camping supplies for Zamba. Following the challenge, the Zamba tribe sort to build a temporary shelter with Thoriso and Renier noticing Jason's hesitant approach at leading the tribe in camp building. Shaun and Qieän started sorting through the food supplies to look for idol clues, to the chagrin of Amy. On the Vuna beach, the tribe gravitated towards Anesu, while she and Wardah kept between them their real world connections through yoga. Despite Chappies' best efforts, the Vuna shelter was incomplete before the night rain started.: Reward Challenge: Each tribe sent forward a delegate to compete in a fire-making challenge. The first to build a fire and successfully burn through their rope won flint and fire-building supplies for their tribe.; Chappies volunteered for Vuna and outshone Jason from Zamba in the challenge. Along with winning the challenge, Nico informed both Chappies and Jason that attending the reward challenge gave each of them Diplomatic Immunity. Both of them were given bracelets that have the ability to let them mutiny from their tribe if they lose an immunity challenge before the merge. Both chose not to reveal this potential immunity to their tribes, with Mike being suspicious of Chappies on his return to Vuna with the reward.: Immunity Challenge: From the river shore, five tribe members must swim out to buoys to retrieve rope ladder rungs. The next two tribe members then must build a rope ladder to reach a platform, where one tribe member must unravel puzzle bags and build the second rope ladder. At the top of the platform, the last two tribe members must complete a puzzle to win immunity for their tribe.; Despite lagging through the beginning portions of the challenge, Vuna came from behind to blitz through the puzzle for the win. During the challenge, Dino tried to get in contact with Paul on Vuna to convince him to be sent to Immunity Island if Zamba lost, something Shaun had noticed. Vuna, however, decided to send Thoriso to Immunity Island, granting her immunity at Zamba's first tribal council. At Immunity Island, Thoriso was given the option to play for a clue to her tribe's hidden immunity idol at the risk of losing her vote, or to leave Immunity Island immediately. She chose to compete and keep her immunity, but lost her vote from failing the challenge. Returning from the immunity challenge, the tribe consensus was to either vote out Shaun or Qieän for their idol searching on Day 1, which didn't sit well with Jason, as he wanted to work with Shaun despite already forming a majority without him. When Jason tried to convince Reiner that the target could be Amy for failing the puzzle, Reiner started spreading the word throughout the majority of the tribe that Jason needed to go, with some doubts from Anela and Amy. Meanwhile, Shaun's behaviour had alienated him from the tribe, leaving him without a clue on what was going on. At Tribal Council, Shaun started to point out suspicious things he noticed from Dino in the immunity challenge, trying to get the target off his back. However, Anela tried to explain the majority's rationale for not trusting Shaun. Upon returning from Immunity Island, Thoriso was forced to explain that she couldn't vote, having accepted the island's immunity necklace. While the Zamba tribe spoke about maintaining tribe loyalty, Shaun was left out of the loop with Reiner successfully blindsiding Jason out of the game for trying to save Shaun.
109	2	"I Can Go 'Bos'... No Pun!"	Day 4-6	June 10, 2021
After being left out of Jason's blindside, Shaun tried to work his way in with the men of Zamba, while Renier and Amy worked to solidify their secret duo. Meanwhile, unity over at Vuna was a bit wobbly with Carla getting annoyed with Pinty's commanding presence around camp.: Reward Challenge: The tribes have to swim four at a time out to a cage structure in the river to retrieve 4 fishing traps with puzzle pieces inside. Once the traps are on the shoreline, the last remaining tribe member must complete a puzzle board, with the winning tribe receiving a fishing kit for their camp.; Zamba came from behind with Dino stunning Vuna and his own tribe with how quick he completed Zamba's puzzle at the reward challenge. Vuna treated the loss as an opportunity to start solidifying alliances in case they lost the immunity challenge. Pinty tried to formulate an alliance with Anesu, Chappies, and Paul; while Carla tried to pull in Mike, Kiran, and Anesu, with Wardah and Tyson in between and Santoni left out.: Immunity Challenge: The two tribes must traverse a 3-stage obstacle course carrying heavy sandbags full of coconuts. At the end of the course, the tribes can open their bags to sift out coconuts for throwing bags. One tribe member then must throw the sandbags to knock over a block puzzle. Once the blocks have all been knocked over, two tribe members must rebuild the block puzzle to win immunity for their tribe.; Again, Dino managed to bring Zamba back from the brink with Qieän's help to win immunity over Vuna. Zamba elected to exile Santoni to Immunity Island, where she won a clue to a hidden immunity idol somewhere at Tribal Council. She also utilized her time in exile to find a second clue for an idol hidden at Vuna. Despite the rainy weather and poor shelter at Vuna, the tribe found themselves stuck between eliminating Mike, whose loyalties outside of Carla and Kiran were unknown, or removing Pinty from their struggling camp life to unify the tribe. Pinty, unaware of the target on her back, informed Tyson about Chappies' Diplomatic Immunity, while Anesu, Kiran, Tyson and Wardah were contemplating the best option for their respective alliances. At Tribal Council, Vuna as a whole talked about trying to form immediate trust among the tribe, with Anesu's networks of alliances joining with Mike and Carla to blindside Pinty, leaving Chappies out of the vote.
110	3	"Always Be Closing"	Day 7-8	June 17, 2021
Carla felt pleased orchestrating Pinty's blindside, but noticed that the men were praising Mike for the move.: Reward Challenge: In a best out of 5 challenge, the two tribes elected 1 tribe member to fight for a sandbag against a tribe member of the same gender on the opposing tribe. Each bout had a prize, ranging from a hammock, chairs, pillows and blankets, a tarp, and a nutrition kit for the winner of each bout. The final bout also included a tribe advantage for the immunity challenge.; Before the reward challenge, the two tribes dropped their buffs for a tribe shuffle. During the challenge, Santoni let Paul know about the hidden immunity idol hidden near Vuna's well, which he tried to relay to Tyson during one of the bouts. As soon as Vuna returned to camp, Tyson went looking for the idol and let his remaining allies (Anesu and Kiran) know that he had found it, to the relief of the outnumbered original Vuna members.: Immunity Challenge: Starting from a floating platform in the river, 5 tribe members had to swim to a floating wall climb, where they had to jump off to reach tied-up rings. When all five rings are returned to the tribe's platform, two tribe members have to toss their rings onto a floating hooked platform, with two retrievers in the water. The first tribe to land all 5 of their rings on their hook wins immunity.; Zamba's advantage won by Anela was that they would need to retrieve only 4 rings instead of 5 in the first half of the challenge. However, despite this advantage, Vuna caught up and beat the new Zamba for immunity. Returning to the Zamba camp, Mike and Carla could sense that the Pinty vote had alienated Chappies and Paul, and they tried to reign in the original Vuna members to stay strong as the majority against Amy, Anela, and Shaun. Amy was exiled to Immunity Island for the afternoon, where she lost a 3D puzzle; this gave the new Vuna an opportunity to raid the Zamba camp after Tribal Council. Tribal Council arrived with Mike, Carla, and Wardah all appealing to Chappies and Paul to remain Vuna strong. However, with Santoni having approached the original Zamba members as well, the outsider Vuna members turned on Mike for his calculated demeanor trying to restrict their game.
111	4	"Gloat or Vote"	Day 9-11	June 24, 2021
The outsider Vuna members on Zamba were happy with their decision to vote out Mike, to Carla and Wardah's misfortune. Day 9 saw Vuna's tribe raid of Zamba occur, with Amy having to reveal that it was her loss at Immunity Island that caused it to happen. During this, Anesu tried to reconnect with Paul and Chappies about Mike's elimination.: Reward Challenge: The tribes had to elect their strongest man and woman. In 3 bouts, each tribe must push a spinning pole around a pivot to knock the opposing tribe's beam. The first tribe to score 2 wins earns a shopping spree at a Survivor Supply Store for themselves or their tribe. This is a modified version of an Immunity challenge used in Season 2: Malaysia.; Marisha almost single-handedly won the reward for Vuna, to celebrate her daughter's birthday while in the game. She and Dino chose to use the reward shopping spree to boost moral at Vuna over their own personal benefits. While in a new majority at Zamba, Paul's general behavior around the camp had begun to annoy all the women in the tribe, with Santoni reaching out to Carla and Wardah about turning against Paul and Chappies. Meanwhile, Shaun had an allergic reaction to some of the tribe's food supply, which led to Medical coming to camp to intervene when he started struggling to breathe.: Immunity Challenge: In pairs, the tribes must race out to a field full of 6 giant crates each and return them to a large wooden structure. They then have to correctly build the crate puzzles stepping up the wooden structure to win immunity for their tribe.; Due to his allergic reaction, Shaun was forced to sit out of the challenge to let the medication work. Vuna blew out Zamba as the women were left unheard while the men tried to build the puzzle. The new Vuna elected to send Carla to Immunity Island, who then decided to Give Up and Go to keep her vote to help protect Wardah. The original Vuna men wanted to get rid of Wardah initially, but when Carla returned to camp and lied about her Immunity Island necklace, they started to switch their target to Carla, knowing the full truth from Santoni's visit earlier in the game. Anela, knowing that it was Paul and Chappies that saved him at the previous Tribal Council, decided to vote with them to avoid betraying Chappies. At the vote, the Vuna women banded together with Amy and Shaun to blindside Paul out of the game.
112	5	"Collateral Damage"	Day 12-13	July 1, 2021
Prior to the last Tribal Council, Thoriso approached Anesu and the original Vuna members about using their hidden immunity idol note, to earn some trust with the original Zamba 6 on Vuna. Anesu agreed in order for her allies to blindside the Zamba majority.: Reward/Immunity Challenge: With both tribes attending Tribal Council, each individual tribe member could choose between two rewards. Each tribe member must stand on a pedestal while on one leg, and balance a large bag of rice on their heads. The last tribe standing wins a hot dog feast to have while attending the opposing tribe's Tribal Council, while the last tribe member standing wins an individual double portion and alcoholic beverage of their choice at the feast. However, both tribes can also play for a trip to Immunity Island for individual immunity at Tribal Council.; Anesu and Thoriso from Vuna were the only ones to play for Immunity Island, with Thoriso losing mere moments after the challenge started. Additionally, Vuna won reward, with Nicole winning the extra nourishment for herself. At Immunity Island, Anesu chose to Stay and Play a timed memory game, and won a Tribal Council Pass. The Pass allows her to select a person to leave Tribal Council before the vote up until the Final 7. Her decision left Kiran and Tyson alone back at camp to fight for their spot in the game, while Dino and Renier wanted to keep Thoriso. Nicole and Marisha pushed for Thoriso as they hadn't formed trust with her and the Hidden Immunity Idol note she held. The Vuna minority's plan to take out a Zamba 6 member fell apart when Tyson was associated to how Thoriso found out she was being targeted. Tyson revealed to the tribe that he'll play his idol and vote for Thoriso, while the Zamba 6 decided, due to doubting Thoriso, to split votes between the two of them. At Tribal Council, the Zamba majority preached about having trust with one another, while Kiran offered to be a backup vote if Thoriso had an idol. Tyson played his idol, while Marisha successfully called out Thoriso's bluff, sending Thoriso out of the game with the help of the Vuna minority. Meanwhile at Zamba, despite the women successfully taking out Paul, the alliance between the Vuna outsiders and the original Zamba members pulled a long bluff to placate Carla, as her lies about her trip to Immunity Island were seen as a final straw. Carla and Wardah tried to keep the women strong to take out Chappies. However, the majority chose to vote Carla out.
113	6	"Control the Flow"	Day 14-16	July 8, 2021
Returning from the Double Tribal Council, the Zamba tribe were left annoyed with the Vuna tribe's behaviour eating during their Tribal Council. Meanwhile Wardah felt blindsided again by another ally's removal from the game. Tyson felt alienated by the Zamba majority having targeted him, forcing an idol play.: Reward Challenge: Starting on platforms in the river, one at a time, each tribe member must collect a puzzle wheel and take it to shore. Once all 8 puzzle wheels are at shore, one tribe member may solve a word puzzle to win a tea and coffee supply set, and pastries for their tribe.; The Zamba tribe struggled in the reward challenge, with Chappies having to assist Anela and Santoni due to the current, being blown away by the Vuna tribe. Vuna offered to share part of their reward with Zamba in acknowledge of the weather conditions and Chappies' efforts. Chappies' heroics were appreciated by the Zamba tribe back at camp, especially after Marisha's visit to drop off the reward, returning Zamba's machete taking from the previous raid.: Immunity Challenge: Three tribe members from each tribe compete in a river bank field to score a ball in their tribe's hoop. The first tribe to score 3 baskets won immunity for their tribe.; On Day 15, Nico surprised the tribes with a tribe shuffle before the challenge. Despite being balanced 7 each, the new Vuna continued their challenge dominance, sending the new Zamba back to Tribal Council. The original Zamba members in Vuna elected to send Anela to Immunity Island, seeing that he, Dino, and Qieän were now outnumbered from original Vuna members. At Immunity Island, Anela chose to stay and play, competing for an extra vote to use at either of the next two tribal councils, but lost the challenge and his next vote. At camp, the rest of the new Zamba tribe deliberated between taking out Dino or Santoni. Tyson, Kiran, and Wardah knew that they could not trust Santoni come merge, due to her friendship with Chappies, but the morning of Tribal Council, Tyson changed his mind wanting to take out Dino for trying to vote him out at the Double Tribal Council. Despite assurance from her original Vuna members, Santoni surprised Zamba and used the Tribal Council Hidden Immunity Idol to protect herself, yet her original tribe stuck together and blindsided Dino out of the game.
114	7	"Look Behind You"	Day 17-18	July 15, 2021
With Dino voted out, tensions between Anela and Wardah continued to build with the numbers shifting in her advantage after the second tribe shuffle. After returning from Immunity Island, Anela lied that he won an extra vote for the first Tribal Council after merge. Qieän's behaviour around the new Zamba came across as selfish to the Vuna majority, eating food she had previously won in rewards openly in front of the tribe. Santoni felt uncomfortable with the new majority, knowing it would protect her only until the merge. At Vuna, Renier took the time to build bonds with Chappies, and reconnected with Amy and the Zamba women.: Reward/Immunity Challenge: From the river platforms, each tribe must untie 3 keys to take to the shore. At the shore, they must unlock a staggered stair puzzle. Solving the stair puzzle, they can unlock a steel ladder on the second stage of the structure, and finally a third box to unlock a puzzle that 1 tribe member must solve to win a Mexican feast, with margaritas, and immunity for their tribe.; Santoni almost pulled out of the challenge seeing that it was another swimming challenge, but with encouragement from both tribes she chose to compete. However, Zamba lost yet another immunity challenge by a dominant Vuna tribe. When deciding whom to send to Immunity Island, both Anela and Qieän quietly pleaded for help, with Vuna deciding to send Anela back to Immunity Island. At the Mexican feast provided to Vuna, the tribe were surprised with video messages from their loved ones around the country. Anela's return to Immunity Island was a blessing in disguise as he was invited to "Stay & Play" a video message from his loved ones, and his own meal reward. The end of his family's message pointed to a clue for him to find, which lead to Anela gaining a steal-a-vote advantage as tribal assurance for the next two Tribal Councils. Meanwhile, Qieän tried to convince Tyson and Kiran that Santoni was their better choice to weaken Chappies at the merge. However, the Vuna originals stuck united in telling Qieän that their minds were made. At Tribal Council, Zamba took out their frustrations with Anela upon his return from Immunity Island, with Wardah clashing with him about Mike and Carla's votes. As their original target was saved by new Vuna, the Vuna originals chose protecting Santoni over weakening Chappies and voted out Qieän as the only Zamba original left in the tribe.
115	8	"Here for a Good Time"	Day 19-21	July 22, 2021
Early on Day 19, Marisha and Renier found the Vuna tribe's hidden immunity idol, promising to use it for the original Zamba alliance come merge. A few hours later, the tribes merged to form the Osindile tribe, and celebrated with a merge feast. Chappies let slip that the Vuna tribe had received videos from their loved ones on a Reward, to the displeasure of Shaun and the last Vuna tribe, and proceeded to look for an idol clue in front of everyone. Returning to the old Vuna camp for merge, Santoni felt excluded from both her Vuna OG alliance and the Zamba women, being talked down to by Marisha. The Zamba alliance congregated to target Chappies using Anela's Tribal Insurance vote steal, letting the Vuna alliance know of their intentions. Over the next two days, the vote steal and Tyson's hidden immunity idol became open knowledge in the Osindile tribe, to Tyson's annoyance, while Anela and Shaun hid clues Anela collected from Immunity Island to successfully lead Chappies on a wild goose chase.: Immunity Challenge: A Survivor classic, each tribe member must cling to a pole for as long as possible without falling off or touching the ground. The last tribe member still on their respective pole wins Immunity.; During the challenge, Kiran initiated talks with Anesu and Tyson about sending one of their allies to Immunity Island to bring back the Immunity Island necklace and keep their vote. Though Anesu had told her allies she would outlast them, she fell and gave Kiran the win. Kiran chose to send Tyson to Immunity Island, who kept to his agreement and chose to Give Up and Go instead of being tempted by Immunity Island. After the challenge, Anesu and Santoni used their connections with the Zamba alliance to misinform them that Vuna were targeting Nicole. Tyson's return from Immunity Island rattled Shaun and Amy, suspecting that the Vuna alliance were planning something, but Anela placated his alliance before Tribal Council. With the Zamba plans in place, Anesu and Santoni realized that their swing position would be difficult to navigate given that Vuna were really targeting Marisha, someone who Santoni doesn't trust anymore. Arriving at Tribal Council, Chappies spoke about being seen as the physical threat at the merge, with Shaun pointing out that Chappies revealing the loved ones' messages caused a loss of trust with Chappies. As Tyson gave up Immunity Island's challenge, he gave Wardah the Immunity Island necklace to protect her from a potential blindside. While the Zamba alliance chose to execute their plan, with Anela stealing Chappies' vote to make up for his No Vote penalty, loading all their votes onto Chappies, Tyson used his immunity idol on Chappies. Nicole scrambled to use Marisha and Renier's idol, but the votes revealed the true blindside with the Vuna alliance except for Anesu all voting Marisha to the jury to a stunned Zamba alliance.
116	9	"A Deal with the Devil"	Day 22-23	July 29, 2021
Nicole broke into tears after Marisha's blindside, with the Vuna alliance celebrating their move gaining majority in the Osindile tribe. Shaun and Santoni locked heads when he figured out that she played double agent to blindside the Zamba alliance. This left Santoni feeling alienated, knowing she doesn't like her Vuna alliance, and didn't throw her vote like Anesu did to save face with the Zamba alliance. She spent the next morning trying to inform Nicole and Amy that Anesu was also involved in Marisha's blindside, also playing double agent with the Zamba alliance.: Reward Challenge: In two teams of five, the first four tribe members must traverse over an obstacle course while balancing a ball on a disc using ropes. If the team drops their ball, they must return to the start of the obstacle they are working on. At the end of obstacle course, the last member of the team must use the ball to knock back 4 suspended targets to win a pizza and beer feast for their team. The tribe member forced to sit out of the challenge can join the winners of the reward if they successfully predict who wins.; Amy, Chappies, Tyson, Renier and Wardah demolished the challenge, and Santoni successfully predicted their win, with reward behind held back at the merge feast. Everyone attending reward knew that a clue was hidden at the table, with Santoni encouraging everyone to look openly. Renier found a clue and read it to everyone, stating that an idol was hidden back at Immunity Island. Despite being in the minority alliance, Renier asked the Vuna alliance to exile him so that he could collect the idol for everyone on Reward, to the confusion of Tyson and Wardah. With this knowledge, the two alliances strategized about winning the next immunity challenge in order to claim the Immunity Island idol.: Immunity Challenge: Nico shows a sequence of coloured tiles to the tribe, with each tribe member having to slide the correct tile to repeat the sequence. If a tile is incorrect, that tribe member is eliminated from the challenge. The challenge continues with new sequences until the last remaining tribe member wins immunity.; Despite a good effort, the Zamba alliance couldn't gain immunity as the challenge ended up as a rematch against Anesu and Kiran. Anesu slipped up again, leading Kiran to win his second immunity necklace. He sent Wardah to Immunity Island to retrieve the idol and maintain control of the majority. However, at Immunity Island, Wardah was informed that if she chose to search for an idol, she had to Stay and Play, losing her vote. Resolving that the alliance needed to maintain majority at Tribal Council, she returned to Osindile immediately to keep her vote. After his win, Kiran chose to sit back and let Santoni choose who Vuna would vote out, as he was concerned about his rising threat level and Santoni's alienated spot in the alliance. Meanwhile, Amy rallied Anela and Shaun to rebuild connections with Santoni as she and Anesu were the Zamba alliance's best shot against Kiran, Tyson, and Wardah. Anesu's trust in her Vuna allies began to falter as Tyson had grown distant from her since the merge, and Amy offered Santoni the option to vote out Wardah due to her sudden return from Immunity Island. At Tribal Council, Wardah continued to point out how people in her alliance still needed to prove loyalty to maintain majority against the diminishing Zamba alliance. Shaun pointed out that Wardah's statement proved that the majority alliance aren't treating everyone in it equally, as a further attempt to swing Santoni away from Vuna. However, as Anesu and Santoni mentioned prior to Tribal Council, the two women chose to stick with the Vuna alliance for one more vote, despite Wardah bequeathing immunity to Tyson thereby confirming her loyalties over her fellow yogi and Santoni. While Kiran, Tyson, and Wardah wanted to vote out Anela, they let Santoni make the pick and the Vuna alliance voted Shaun into the jury to maintain their majority over Zamba.
117	10	"Tied Destinies"	Day 24-26	August 5, 2021
After voting out Shaun, Tyson felt that Kiran and himself were taking control over Osindile. However, Anesu was developing a plan to betray her Vuna alliance, as the men and Wardah had been keeping information about the Immunity Island Idol away from her. Bouncing ideas off Amy and Chappies, the Zamba minority saw a lifeline in Anesu. However, Tree Mail on Day 24 introduced a new twist into the game, Tied Destinies. The tribe randomly drew for their partner they would be paired with until the next Tribal Council; during the twist: if they won a challenge, their partner would win too, and if they got voted out, their partner would be eliminated as well. The pairing went along original tribal lines; Tyson and Wardah's pairing became enticing for Anesu, Chappies, and Santoni to make a move against their Vuna allies.: Reward/Immunity Challenge: Each tribe member must use one foot to balance a pot on the edge of a beam. If their pot falls, they are out of the challenge. The last tribe member still balancing their pot wins immunity and a day trip to the Wild Waves Water Park at the Wild Coast Sun. Due to two individual immunities available in this challenge, no one would be exiled to Immunity Island.; Nicole managed to outlast Amy in a particularly windy challenge, earning immunity for herself, and her partner, Anela. When given the opportunity to bring another pair to the reward, Nicole decided to bring Renier and Amy, despite the Zamba minority agreeing to split up the Vuna pairs if they won reward, prior to the challenge. The Vuna majority used the time alone back at Osindile to confirm that Renier and Amy would be their target as the Zamba players without immunity. Returning from the reward, Amy led the effort to flip Anesu and Chappies, but the two were struggling to judge if the timing was right to make the move against Tyson and Wardah. Anela tried to offer Santoni (and her partner, Chappies) as an option to Kiran, as Santoni had lost all trust with Zamba, which saw her and Amy fall out over her continuous lies and betrayal against Zamba. Anela's adaptable pitch impressed Kiran, where the two managed to settle differences between Anela and Wardah, offering him a Final 4 deal. Anela forwarded this offer to Anesu, confirming her suspicions of the true hierarchy in the Vuna majority. At Tribal Council, the Zamba minority talked about being picked off by the Vuna alliance, although implying that there were cracks in the majority. Wardah confronted Amy about that statement, demanding her to point out the people allegedly on the bottom, until Chappies interrupted the women to stop their argument. However, tension at Tribal Council increased when Renier made a bold declaration to Kiran that he was going to idol him and his partner, Anesu, out of the game if he didn't flip on Chappies and Santoni. Kiran became agitated as Renier wouldn't show proof he possessed an idol. Nico, at Chappies' suggestion, halted the tribe's arguments in order for the vote to take place. Before the votes were revealed, Renier stood up and played his fake idol to toy with the Vuna majority, before explaining that he chose to aggravate Kiran as a decoy to allow a move to happen without detection. The vote revealed, however, that Anesu, Chappies, and Santoni decided to stick with the Vuna majority for another vote, leaving Renier's gamble falling flat on his face. With Renier voted into the jury, his Tied Destiny partner, Amy was eliminated by default and joined him on the jury.
118	11	"Brownie Points Are Everything"	Day 27-28	August 12, 2021
After surviving the Tied Destinies twist, Tyson felt that he was in control of Osindile, with Kiran and Wardah as his right and left hand. Meanwhile, Anesu and Chappies were finally ready to blindside Tyson with Santoni as the Destiny Three against the Vuna majority.: Reward Challenge: In teams of four, each team must throw coconuts into a hanging net until the weight knocks over a tower of puzzle pieces. The first team to solve the puzzle after knocking their tower over wins a test drive with the Mahindra Thar to a South African afternoon braai. A surprise of letters from home awaited for the winning team at the reward braai.; In a schoolyard pick, Santoni was left furious with Kiran's decision to pick Nicole over herself, re-affirming to her that she was not on equal footing with the Vuna majority. While on reward, Chappies, Kiran, and Wardah all opened up to Nicole about the alliance willing to make moves with her and Anela. Leading up to the immunity challenge, both sides of the Vuna majority were approaching Anela and Nicole about making a move. With the knowledge that there was a Hidden Immunity Idol still to be claimed at Immunity Island, Anesu and Chappies planned that if Tyson didn't win immunity, they would send Santoni to retrieve the idol.: Immunity Challenge: Starting in the middle of the river, each tribe member must swim to a balancing platform. Once upon the platform, they must carry a ring from one side to the other, before swimming under the platform to start the cycle again. The first tribe member to place all 5 of their rings on the end of their respective floating platform wins immunity.; The Osindile tribe were offered a large bowl of Spaghetti Bolognaise with soft drinks for as long as the challenge ran if they sat out. This offer resulted in the biggest sit out in Survivor South Africa's history with only Nicole determined enough to face Chappies in the river. Chappies took the lead early in the challenge, but decided to sit at the end of his last cycle to let Nicole catch up, allowing for the sit outs to have more food. With his inevitable win, and Nicole's determination, the tribe applauded both of their actions once returning to the riverbank. As planned, Chappies chose to send Santoni to Immunity Island, where she competed for a Fire Idol (a new advantage where if a tribe member used a Fire Idol at tribal council, the tribe member who was voted out would be given a chance to compete in a fire-making duel to remain in the game). However, Santoni ran out of time, and as punishment, she was informed that she'd receive half the amount of money the rest of Osindile would get at the upcoming Survivor Auction. Returning to camp, both sides of the Vuna alliance were offering pitches to Anela and Nicole. Kiran and Tyson went so far as to offer Anela a spot in the Final Three by taking Wardah out at Final 6. Anesu pitched to the Zamba duo that the trio of Kiran, Tyson, and Wardah would be unbreakable the further they stick together. Kiran coordinated his trio to blindside Anesu, someone with a similar adaptable social game that he was playing. Anela and Nicole convened before Tribal, with Anela preferring to side with Kiran and Tyson as it would bolster his own resumé, saving Tyson, over letting Anesu and Chappies make a move first against Tyson. Anesu contemplated using her Tribal Council Pass if she started to suspect Kiran was about to betray her. At Tribal Council, both sides of the Vuna majority continued to bluff to one another, affirming to Nico that the Zamba tribe would be eliminated first before the majority would turn on themselves. Anesu and Chappies discussed making the move at the best time. When the vote was revealed, Anela and Nicole decided to side with the dominant Vuna trio to blindside Anesu into the jury. Before she had her torch extinguished, Anesu smuggled her Tribal Council Pass to Chappies for the advantage to remain in the game.
119	12	"All in a Day's Work"	Day 29-30	August 19, 2021
Despite Operation Destiny falling apart, Chappies and Santoni were prepared to use the Tribal Council Pass and Hidden Immunity Idol at the next Tribal Council to get revenge for Anesu. The remaining Vuna majority had figured Santoni managed to find the idol during her stint on Immunity Island.: Survivor Auction: Nicole bought herself a Beggar's Plate, allowing her to beg from everyone else for parts of their bought items, including items unsold like champagne and a bath while watching the auction. Santoni and Anela bought letters from home. Kiran bought himself out of the auction, giving the rest of his money to Wardah. Chappies bought a platter of sweets, chocolates, and cake. Anela bought himself a Tapas platter. Tyson bought himself fish and chips, and an advantage for the immunity challenge. Wardah bought herself Vetkoek and mince, but was offered a bag of rice for the tribe, which she chose, leaving Nicole to claim the Vetkoek. Nicole also bought an Immunity Island Send Ticket, allowing her to decide who goes to Immunity Island regardless of who won the upcoming immunity challenge. At the end of the auction, Wardah used her leftover money to buy Kiran his letter from home.; The morning after the auction, Tyson and Anela sifted through Chappies' bag and discovered that Chappies had snuck sweets from the auction back to camp, keeping it to himself, and the Tribal Council Pass, which derailed their plans to take either him or Santoni out in the next vote. Kiran, however, pushed to play double agent to lull the duo into a false sense of security. Tensions at Osindile increased when the tribe discovered that Chappies had been stealing the rice and cooking for himself at night in secret, failing to return the pot to the camp fire from his hiding spot.: Immunity Challenge: Each tribe member must navigate a tangled obstacle course while attached to a rope. In an elimination race of three stages, only 5 will compete in the second stage, and 3 tribe members compete in the final leg. The first castaway to finish the final stage of the obstacle course wins immunity.; Tyson's advantage from the auction allowed him to bypass the first stage of the challenge. However, it was not enough to keep up with Chappies in the final stage alongside Anela. Having not won immunity, Nicole used her Immunity Island Send Ticket to send herself to Immunity Island, where after completing a 100 tile sequence puzzle in time, won herself the Fire Idol. With Chappies immune, and Santoni holding an idol, the majority were at a loss on how to move forward, with Kiran attempting to signal to the duo that he'd be willing to flip on Wardah. But with the stolen rice and sweets, it left a sour taste in the tribe's mouth leading up to Tribal Council. Upon arriving at Tribal Council, it quickly devolved into accusations of cheating and theft from the split Vuna faction. Tyson called out Chappies for stealing sweets (claiming it gave him an unfair advantage for the immunity challenge), with Chappies responding that the people who were on the Braai reward had all stolen food to share with the camp previously. Wardah then brought up the rice situation, pointing out that Chappies had been stealing the rice from the tribe, and that she brought the rice she bought at the auction to Tribal Council to protect it from Chappies. However, it had turned out Chappies and Santoni heard about Wardah's threat, with Chappies having stolen that bag of rice from Wardah's bag and brought it with him to Tribal Council as well. With Wardah calling for repercussions towards Chappies, Nico finally intervened to establish clarity about all the food that had been stolen by Osindile over the last few days, pointing out that multiple thefts have happened, with everyone guilty, thus how could he judge one theft differently over another, when everyone broke the Reward rules at this stage in the game. Setting the arguments aside, Nico called for a vote, where Chappies began his Operation Destiny revenge. He used the Tribal Council Pass on Anela, leaving the remaining Vuna trio to target Santoni as the only remaining option. Santoni then played her idol to negate three votes, sending a despondent Wardah to the jury and a bitter majority against the duo.
120	13	"A Very Weird Vibe"	Day 31-33	August 26, 2021
Anela was left stunned that Chappies saved him with the Tribal Council Pass, someone who kept on breaking trust against him throughout the merge. Chappies and Tyson continued arguing into the night upon returning to Osindile however. The next morning, Tyson and Kiran solidified allegiances with Anela, forming a League of Shadows, to work against Santoni and Chappies.: Reward Challenge: Standing on a tapered beam, each tribe member must balance a statue on top of a long pole above their heads. At regular intervals, they must move down the beam to narrower and narrower sections. If their statue falls, or they step off their beam, they are out of the challenge. The last person standing wins reward.; After Nico explained the Reward challenge, he surprised Osindile with their loved ones who'd help them set up the challenge. Chappies and Tyson quickly became the last two remaining in the challenge, with Chappies winning his third individual challenge in the end. Nico then announced to Chappies that his reward was not who to pick to have an afternoon with their loved ones alongside him and his wife, but the opportunity to pick his two challengers in the upcoming immunity challenge, leaving the other half of the tribe with no chance back at camp. He chose Anela and Santoni to compete with him the next day. After the challenge, Osindile were given the opportunity to bring all their loved ones back to camp to enjoy a Build-Your-Own Burger braai to unwind and celebrate their reunions. Towards the end of the afternoon, Kiran spotted a pouch above a strategically placed logo by the reward's sponsor. He asked Nicole's brother for help to retrieve it, unbeknownst to only Chappies and Santoni.: Immunity Challenge: Each with a grappling hook, the three tribe members competing in the challenge must throw their hooks to retrieve a ring containing a ball. Once they have acquired their ball, they can attempt a pulley maze. The first tribe member to land their ball in the middle of the maze wins immunity.; With Chappies immune again, the League of Shadows put in work for the tribe to think that they were targeting Santoni at Tribal Council. Meanwhile, Kiran and Tyson considered blindsiding Nicole, as she's done well in endurance challenges before. Anela felt uncomfortable with alienating his ally and the Zamba jury members with the move, so he approached Chappies, Nicole, and Santoni with the possibility of flipping the vote onto Kiran for being a strategic threat. While Nicole revealed her Fire Idol to the foursome, Santoni pushed for a 2-2-2 split to avoid idols and fire-making, making Anela feel like his move against Kiran was being taken over by Santoni. This led to Anela revealing his plotting to a dumbfounded Kiran shortly before Tribal Council. Angered by what he felt was amateur gameplay, Kiran began Tribal Council airing out Anela's confession, blowing up the outsiders' plans. Berated by Kiran for betraying their trust, Anela tried to explain that Kiran's plans to target Nicole was a bad move for his own game, so he wanted to make a move for himself. Tyson piped in to also berate Anela for his betrayal, calling it a poor attempt at making a big move. Santoni attempted to interject to point out Kiran's own betrayals in the past, but Kiran then turned his ire against her for turning on alliances and turning people against him in the game. At the vote, Anela stuck with the League of Shadows that outed his game to send Santoni to the jury, but the outsiders continued with their own plan, with Nicole playing the Fire Idol after Kiran played his new Hidden Immunity Idol. Tyson, the only other person to receive valid votes, squared off against Santoni in a fire-making duel, where Tyson finally managed to eliminate Santoni and send her to the jury.
121	14	"A Sour Taste in the Mouth"	TBA	September 2, 2021
Following Anela's betrayal of the League of Shadows, Kiran talked to Nicole about voting Anela out next. However, Tyson was still dead set on voting out Chappies, who likewise pitched to Anela and Nicole that Kiran and Tyson were the most dangerous players left due to their strong partnership.: Reward Challenge: Chappies continued his winning streak and chose to share his reward with Anela in order to again pitch voting out Kiran or Tyson. The other tribe members appointed Kiran to be the "minister of rice", in charge of rationing rice following the events at the auction. Chappies worked his way around this one as well, leading Kiran to try and convince Anela that Chappies needed to go next.: Immunity Challenge: Chappies won his fourth straight immunity challenge (sixth straight individual challenge overall), derailing Kiran's plot to take him out. The two old Zamba, along with Chappies, agreed that Kiran was a bigger threat than Tyson, and despite the pair's efforts to stay alive, they knew it was the end of the line. Indeed, at Tribal Council, the three eliminated half of the game's tightest duo and sent Kiran to the jury.
122	15	"The Fruits of Your Labour"	TBA	September 9, 2021
Reward/Immunity Challenge: In addition to Immunity, the winner would also receive a breakfast with a juror of their choice.; Following a fifth straight immunity win, Chappies chose to eat with Anesu, who gave him advice on how to present his game to the jury and which jurors would be tough to sway in his favor. Chappies also earned the right to eliminate a juror at the next Tribal Council, and he chose Wardah. Once Chappies returned to camp, Tyson pitched to him to break up the tight duo of Anela and Nicole, but Chappies, thinking this season would end in a final three, decided that Tyson was the more pressing threat. However, at Tribal Council, he was proven wrong when Nico announced it would be a final two, causing Chappies to change his target to Anela since neither he nor Nicole would be likely to take Chappies to the end. But this also fell through when Tyson voted for Nicole instead; with the Zamba pair sticking together for another vote, Tyson was sent to the jury in Wardah's place.
123	16	"The Final Decision & Immunity Island Reunion"	TBA	September 16, 2021
Anela and Nicole agreed to take each other to the end no matter what if Chappies lost the final challenge.: Reward/Immunity Challenge: The final three had to stand with a hand on a statue. If they removed their hand or touched the statue with any other body part, they were eliminated. The last one left standing won final immunity.; Nicole managed to break Chappies' record-tying streak and earned her place in the final two. In a last-ditch effort, Chappies told Nicole that Anela stood the best chance to win due to his social game while he himself would be torn apart by the jury for his hoarding food throughout the merge. However, Nicole decided to stick true to her longtime ally and sent Chappies to the jury. At the Final Tribal Council, Anela was praised for his social game but criticized for his weak strategy, while Nicole was questioned over her seemingly quiet and passive game. Nicole's answers defending her authentic strategy won over eight of the nine jurors, and she was named South Africa's eighth Ultimate Survivor.

== Voting history ==
	Original Tribes		First Swap				Second Swap		Merged Tribe										
Episode #	1	2	3	4	5		6	7	8	9	10 (Note: On Day 24, Osindile were introduced to the Tied Destiny twist. The tribe randomly drew for a partner they would to tied to until Tribal Council on Day 26. If a castaway won Immunity, their partner would also be immune; if a castaway was voted out at Tribal Council, their partner would be eliminated alongside them. The Tied Destiny partners are indicated by the coloured blocks next to the castaway's name, corresponding with the bandana colour they drew during the challenge.)		11	12	13		14	15	16
Day #	3	6	8	11	13		16	18	21	23	26		28	30	33		35	37	38
Eliminated	Jason	Pinty	Mike	Paul	Thoriso	Carla	Dino	Qieän	Marisha	Shaun	Renier	Amy	Anesu	Wardah	Santoni & Tyson (Note: Nicole played a Fire Idol, forcing the two highest vote receivers into a fire-making challenge to remain in the game. Santoni and Tyson competed in the challenge.)	Santoni	Kiran	Tyson	Chappies
Votes	7–2	6–2–1	5–3	5–2–1	2–1–0 (Note: Tyson played a hidden immunity idol on himself, therefore four votes against him was not counted.)	5–2	4–0 (Note: Santoni played a hidden immunity idol on herself, therefore two votes against her was not counted.)	4–1	4–0 (Note: Nicole played a hidden immunity idol on herself, and Tyson played a hidden immunity idol on Chappies; therefore, zero and seven votes against Nicole and Chappies did not count.)	6–5	6–4	Tied Destiny	5–2	2–0 (Note: Santoni played a hidden immunity idol on herself, therefore three votes against her was not counted.)	3–2–0 (Note: Kiran played a hidden immunity idol on himself, therefore one vote against him was not counted.)	Challenge	3–2	2–1–1	1–0
Voter	Vote																		
Nicole	Jason				~~Tyson~~				~~Chappies~~	Wardah	Tyson		Anesu	None (Note: This castaway did not vote as they Stayed and Played on Immunity Island.)	~~Kiran~~		Kiran	Tyson	Chappies
Anela	Jason		Mike	Wardah		Carla	None	None	~~Chappies~~ (Note: Anela was set to not vote following losing a challenge on Immunity Island. However, as he used the Vote Steal on Chappies', Anela was able to cast a vote.)	Wardah	Tyson		Anesu	None (Note: Chappies used a Tribal Council Pass, allowing for one person to leave Tribal Council and return to camp before the vote. Chappies chose to use the pass on Anela, making him immune, yet unable to cast a vote.)	Santoni		Kiran	Tyson	None
Chappies		Mike	Mike	Carla		Carla			None	Shaun	Renier		Tyson	Wardah	Tyson		Kiran	Anela	None
Tyson		Pinty			Thoriso		Dino	Qieän	Marisha	Shaun	Renier		Anesu	~~Santoni~~	Santoni	Won	Nicole	Nicole	
Kiran		Pinty			Thoriso		Dino	Qieän	Marisha	Shaun	Renier		Anesu	~~Santoni~~	Santoni		Nicole		
Santoni		None	Mike	Paul		Carla	Dino	Qieän	Marisha	Shaun	Renier		None	Wardah	Tyson	Lost			
Wardah		Pinty	Anela	Paul		Chappies	Dino	Qieän	Marisha	Shaun	Renier		Anesu	~~Santoni~~					
Anesu		Pinty			None				~~Chappies~~	Shaun	Renier		Tyson						
Amy	Jason		None	Paul		Carla			~~Chappies~~	Wardah	Tyson								
Renier	Jason				~~Tyson~~				~~Chappies~~	Wardah	Tyson								
Shaun	Qieän		Mike	Paul		Carla			~~Chappies~~	Wardah									
Marisha	Jason				Kiran				~~Chappies~~										
Qieän	Jason				~~Tyson~~		~~Santoni~~	Santoni											
Dino	Jason				~~Tyson~~		~~Santoni~~												
Carla		Pinty	Anela	Paul		Chappies													
Thoriso	None				None (Note: This castaway lost their vote from losing a challenge on Immunity Island.)														
Paul		Wardah	Mike	Wardah															
Mike		Pinty	Anela																
Pinty		Mike																	
Jason	Qieän																		

Jury vote
Episode #	16	
Day #	39	
Finalist	Nicole	Anela
Votes	8–1	
Chappies	Nicole	
Tyson	Nicole	
Kiran	Nicole	
Santoni	Nicole	
Wardah	None (Note: For winning the Immunity challenge on Day 36, Chappies also earned the power to eliminate a juror on Day 37. He chose Wardah.)	
Anesu	Nicole	
Amy	Nicole	
Renier	Nicole	
Shaun		Anela
Marisha	Nicole	
