= Survivor South Africa: Panama =

- Season 1
- Presented by: Mark Bayly
- No. of days: 29
- No. of castaways: 14
- Winner: Vanessa Marawa
- Runner-up: Jacinda Louw
- Location: Pearl Islands, Panama
- No. of episodes: 13

Release
- Original network: M-Net
- Original release: September 3 – November 26, 2006

Additional information
- Filming dates: June 2006 – July 2006

Season chronology
- Next → Malaysia

Survivor South Africa: Panama is the first season of the South African reality television show Survivor South Africa, based on the international reality game show franchise Survivor. It was filmed in Panama, featuring 14 castaways competing for the grand prize of R1,000,000 prize. The season premiered on M-Net on 3 September 2006, with a live finale and reunion on November 26, 2006, where Vanessa Marawa was crowned South Africa's first Sole Survivor over Jacinda Louw by a vote of 3–2. The season was hosted by Mark Bayly, and co-produced by Endemol South Africa, and Strix (The production company that produced Expedition Robinson for Sweden).

== Deadman's Island ==
After the tribes merged, the first four castaways voted out of Burba were unknowingly exiled to Deadman's Island, where they would compete in a challenge for two of them to re-enter the game on Day 25 and the two to lose would be the first and second members of the jury. The twist is similar to Purgatory in Australian Survivor: Blood V Water.

== Contestants ==
The 14 castaways were divided into two predetermined tribes of seven, the blue Aguila (Spanish for Eagle) and the red Rana (Spanish for Frog). However, due to a medical evacuation on Day 12, a voted out castaway from Rana was spared eliminated and swapped over to Aguila. Day 17 saw the remaining 7 castaways merged into the yellow Burba tribe.

List of Survivor South Africa: Panama contestants
Contestant	Original tribe	Switched tribe	Merged tribe	Finish
Don Soper; 54, Johannesburg, Gauteng	Rana			1st voted out Day 3
Sam Allerton; 30, Hogsback, Eastern Cape	Aguila			2nd voted out Day 6
Jude Wilken; 39, Kempton Park, Gauteng	Aguila			Quit; Day 8
Ncumisa Ngcaweni; 30, Cape Town, Western Cape	Rana			3rd voted out Day 10
Sanele Gumede; 27, Johannesburg, Gauteng	Aguila			Medically evacuated Day 12
Danielle Vukic; 35, Cape Town, Western Cape	Rana	Aguila		4th voted out Day 14
Nico Hinis; 43, Johannesburg, Gauteng	Aguila	Aguila		5th voted out Day 16
Brigitte Willers; 24, Johannesburg, Gauteng	Aguila	Aguila	Burba	Lost Deadman's Challenge; 2nd jury member Day 25
Lezel Crook; 28, Cape Town, Western Cape	Rana	Rana	Burba	Lost Deadman's Challenge; 1st jury member Day 25
Gareth Tjasink; 27, Johannesburg, Gauteng	Rana	Rana	Burba	10th voted out 3rd jury member Day 27
Zayn Nabbi; 24, Durban, KwaZulu-Natal	Rana	Rana	Burba	Lost Challenge (Note: The final four competed in an endurance challenge; the first to fall joined the jury while the winner of the challenge would automatically be in the final Tribal Council. Zayn was the first person to fall and was eliminated.); 4th jury member Day 28
Mzi Tyhokolo; 31, Johannesburg, Gauteng	Aguila	Aguila	Burba	Lost Challenge (Note: The second and third castaway to fall in the Day 28 endurance challenge had to face off in one final immunity challenge to face Vanessa at the final Tribal Council. Jacinda beat Mzi and sent him to the jury.); 5th jury member Day 29
Jacinda Louw; 25, Johannesburg, Gauteng	Rana	Rana	Burba	Runner-up; Day 29
Vanessa Marawa; 27, Durban, KwaZulu-Natal	Aguila	Aguila	Burba	Sole Survivor; Day 29

== Season summary ==
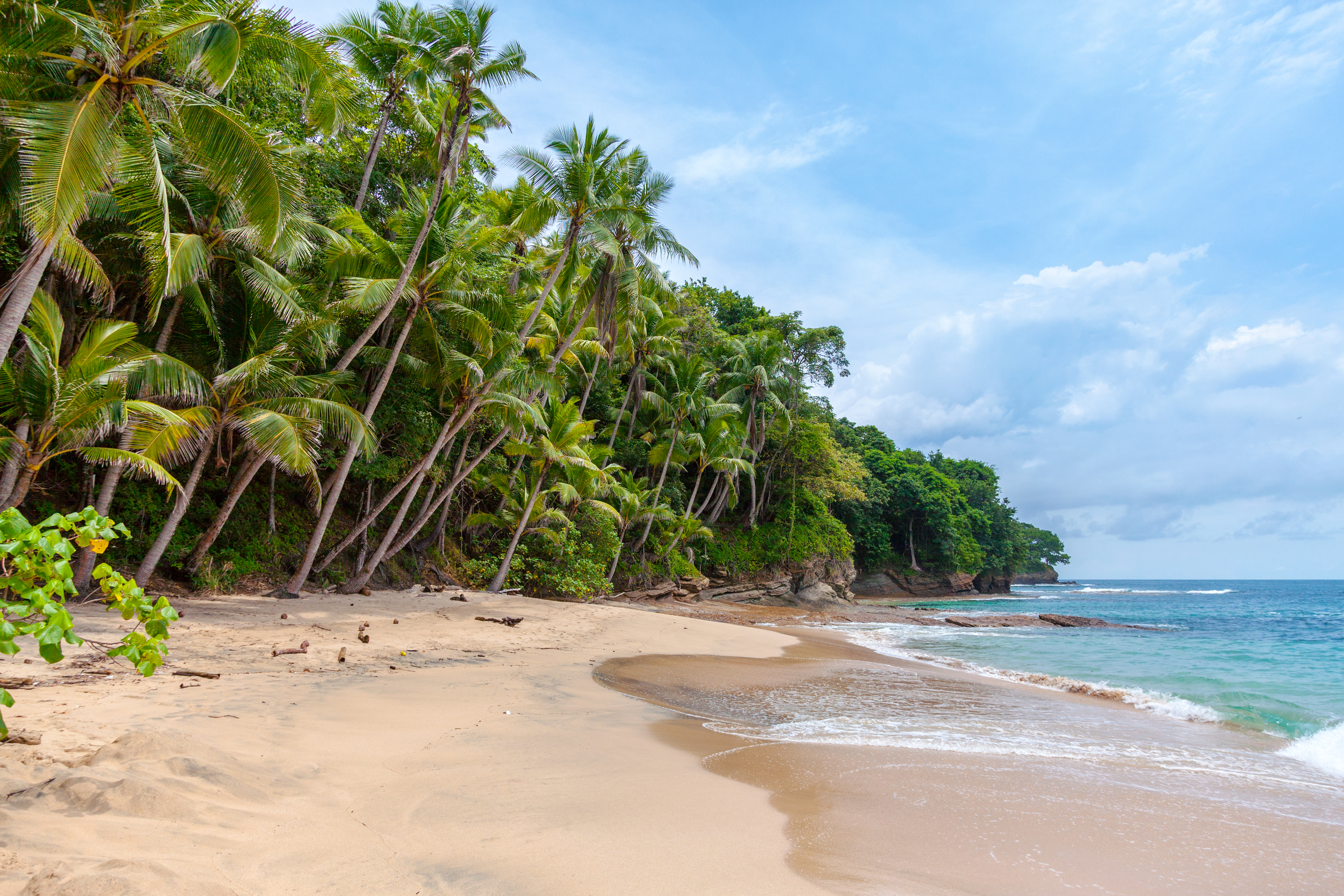
The season was filmed in the Pearl Islands in Panama.

The game began with two tribes of seven: Aguila and Rana. Aguila proved to be the stronger tribe initially until Sam clashed with the tribe's provider, Mzi, and two fellow tribe members quit and were medically evacuated from the game respectively. Whereas the Rana tribe struggled to find their footing until Jacinda took control with Gareth and Lezel. A medical evacuation from the Aguila tribe on Day 12 saw Rana outsider, Danielle, survive being voted out by inheriting Sanele's torch; joining Aguila as a result. However, Aguila lost their physical strength over Rana when Sanele was evacuated, which forced them to vote out Danielle and, longtime Aguila outsider, Nico, before entering the merge in the minority.

On Day 17, the Final 7 players merged to form Burba. With Jacinda leading the votes, and Gareth winning Immunity challenges, the Rana 4 alliance successfully voted out the Aguila minority. When the only Rana 4 remained, Jacinda and Gareth betrayed close ally, Lezel, to keep a physically weaker Zayn for the Final 3 Immunity challenge. However, unbeknownst to the Final 3, throughout the merge the first 4 castaways voted out of Burba were exiled to Deadman's Island. They were exiled there until Day 25 where Mzi and Vanessa, two close Aguila allies, outlasted Brigitte and Lezel to re-enter the game. Upon their return, Jacinda decided to flip on Gareth with the help of the returnees. After voting out Gareth for being a physical threat, the new Final 4 competed in two challenges to determine the Final 2 of the Season. Vanessa won the first seat on Day 28, which saw Zayn lose and enter the jury. While Jacinda beat Mzi in a lengthy challenge on Day 29 to secure the second seat next to Vanessa that night at Final Tribal Council.

The Final Tribal Council saw Jacinda confronted with leading and then betraying the very same alliance she created, while Vanessa's reserved presence thorough the season was scrutinized in relation to her ally's, Mzi, active role as Aguila and Burba's food provider. In the end, the jury appreciated Vanessa's perseverance throughout the season over Jacinda's strategic leadership, making Vanessa the first South African Sole Survivor in a 3–2 final vote.

Challenge winners and eliminations by episode
Episode		Challenge winner(s)		Eliminated	Finish
No.	Original air date	Reward	Immunity	Eliminated	Finish
1	September 3, 2006	Aguila	Aguila	Don	1st voted out Day 3
2	September 10, 2006	Aguila	Rana	Sam	2nd voted out Day 6
3	September 17, 2006	Aguila	Rana	Jude	Quit; Day 8
4	September 24, 2006	Aguila (Note: Both tribes competed separately to win their tribe's reward.)	Aguila	Ncumisa	3rd voted out Day 10
4	September 24, 2006	Rana	Aguila	Ncumisa	3rd voted out Day 10
5	October 1, 2006	Aguila	Aguila	Sanele	Medically Evacuated; Day 12
5	October 1, 2006	Aguila	Aguila	No elimination on Day 12 due to Medical Evacuation. (Note: After Rana voted out Danielle, Sanele was summoned to Tribal Council. As Sanele was medically evacuated from the game, his torch remained lit. Danielle was given Sanele's torch to continue playing, switching to the Aguila tribe that night instead of going home.)	
6	October 8, 2006	Aguila	Rana	Danielle	4th voted out Day 14
7	October 15, 2006	Rana	Rana	Nico	5th voted out Day 16
8	October 22, 2006	None	Gareth	Brigitte	6th voted out Deadman's Island (Note: On Day 19, 21, 22 and 24 after being voted out, Brigitte, Mzi, Vanessa and Lezel respectively learnt that they would go to Deadman's Island and await a chance to return to the game.); Day 19
9	October 29, 2006	Jacinda [Lezel]	Gareth	Mzi	7th voted out Deadman's Island; Day 21
10	November 5, 2006	Vanessa [Gareth]	Gareth	Vanessa	8th voted out Deadman's Island; Day 22
11	November 12, 2006	Gareth	Gareth	Lezel	9th voted out Deadman's Island; Day 24
12	November 19, 2006	Zayn	Mzi	Lezel	Lost Challenge; 1st jury member Day 25
12	November 19, 2006	Zayn	Mzi	Brigitte	Lost Challenge; 2nd jury member Day 25
12	November 19, 2006	Zayn	Mzi	Gareth	10th voted out 3rd jury member Day 27
13	November 26, 2006	None	Vanessa	Zayn	Eliminated (Note: The castaways participated in an endurance challenge; the first to lose the challenge was sent to the jury, while the winner was granted a place at the Final Tribal Council. Zayn was the first to lose, and Vanessa won a spot in the Final Tribal Council.); 4th jury member Day 28
13	November 26, 2006	None	Jacinda	Mzi	Eliminated (Note: Jacinda and Mzi had to compete in a physical and mental challenge, where the winner would join Vanessa in the Final 2 and send the loser to the jury. Jacinda beat Mzi and joined Vanessa for the Final Tribal Council.); 5th jury member Day 29
13	November 26, 2006			Jury vote	
13	November 26, 2006			Jacinda	Runner Up; Day 29
13	November 26, 2006			Vanessa	Ultimate Survivor; Day 29

In the case of multiple tribes or castaways who win reward or immunity, they are listed in order of finish, or alphabetically where it was a team effort; where one castaway won and invited others, the invitees are in brackets.

== Episodes ==
No. overall	No. in season	Title	Timeline	Original release date
1	1	"Episode 1"	Day 1-3	September 3, 2006
Arriving in the Pearl Islands for a media briefing, 14 South Africans were divided into two tribes of 7 (Aguila in Blue and Rana in Red) and were marooned immediately in Panama.: Marooning Challenge: With a map, and a tribe backpack for their belongings, the tribes must find a fuel container and pump in the nearby village. Each tribe has to bring their fuel to a boat that will take them to Black Pearl Island. The tribes must swim to shore and climb a steep embankment to retrieve their tribe flag. With their tribe flag in hand, the first tribe to claim the Black Pearl Island beach claims the island as their home for the season, and a chest full of supplies to help build their shelter. While the losing tribe have to be transported to Lost Island and must search for their hidden supply chest.; During the challenge Rana started raiding the local village's fire station for supplies while searching for their fuel, giving Aguila a lead that they couldn't recover from. The win allowed for Aguila to have a steady shelter and fire before night. Delayed because of water conditions, Rana only arrived at Lost Island in the middle of the night, having to search for their supply chest in the dark, and without a stable temporary shelter. Sam and Mzi worked to lead Aguila through building the shelter, and using their supplies to catch fish, respectively. Mzi's efforts to provide food eventually won the tribe over, catching fish for Aguila after the Immunity challenge. Over at Rana, despite the long first night, the tribe generally worked well together in order set up their camp.: Immunity Challenge: Starting on a raft by the shore, each tribe are attached to their raft's mast, and must traverse with their mast along a guided rope through the nearby mangrove swamp. The first tribe to return to their raft and hoist up their mast wins immunity.; Returning from the Immunity challenge, Jacinda and Lezel felt adamant that Danielle's demeanor around camp was detrimental to the tribe to the point where everyone told her she was going to be voted out. However, Don started feeling fatigued by the island life, separating himself socially during the day before tribal council, while Danielle worked around camp. At Tribal Council, the tribe spoke about how they were adapting to island life, but needed to build unity in the tribe. While discussing about the Immunity Challenge loss, Don felt that Rana should have had a man leading instead of Jacinda. In the end, Rana were split between tribe loyalty and tribe strength, with Jacinda, Gareth, and Zayn sparing Danielle to vote out an unwell Don.
2	2	"Episode 2"	Day 4-6	September 10, 2006
Tribal Council was difficult for Rana, but Jacinda was excited that her game had finally began. The atmosphere over at Aguila was positive, where their food and shelter situation was more stable. Brigitte and Sam were identified as a duo as Aguila noticed how close the two were getting since the beginning.: Reward Challenge: Each tribe elect a tribe member to compete in a game of reverse sumo. Harnessed to a rope, each tribe member have to try pull against the other to reach their tribe's stake. The first tribe to score 3 points wins a fishing net and flint for reward.; Aguila dominated in the reward challenge, however, the celebration was short-lived while they struggled to make fire in the rain. Tensions flared with Sam losing his temper at Mzi while they were building the fire. Jude and Vanessa stepped in to put de-escalate Sam, which left him stunned at the sudden shift against him. Morale in Rana sunk after the third loss, despite giving themselves time to strategize before challenges, but they came to a consensus to elect Jacinda as their leader to organize themselves for future challenges. Their woes continued the next morning as the tribe woke up to sand flea infestation due to their shelter's location on their island.: Immunity Challenge: With one tribe member attached to a cannon, each tribe must push their cannon across a obstacle course through the jungle. The first tribe to cross the finish line on the beach at the end of the course wins Immunity.; Deciding that Zayn should pull Rana's cannon from the front once they hit the beach stretch, they managed to overtake Aguila on the beach to win their first challenge and Immunity. Their search for food slightly improved as well when Ncumisa discovered fallen fruit for the tribe on Day 6. Returning to camp, Sam felt that his temper had put a target on his back, so he tried to rally an alliance with Brigitte, Jude, and Nico to target Vanessa for challenge strength. However, Jude and Mzi saw through the duo's scheming. While Jude wanted to target Brigitte, Mzi had noticed how unified Rana was at the Immunity challenge. At Tribal Council, Mzi and Sam spoke about the rifts in Aguila, with Sam expressing how vulnerable he was after the fire-making incident. With calls for tribe unity from the majority, Aguila voted Sam to split him up from Brigitte, and to rebuild tribe morale.
3	3	"Episode 3"	Day 7-8	September 17, 2006
The mood in Aguila rose as the tribe's decision to keep Mzi for his role as food provider over the combatant Sam saw tribe morale return to normal. While Rana were starving as they still struggled to make fire after a week in the game.: Reward Challenge: Three tribe members from each tribe competed in an elimination foot race on the beach. Starting while lying down in the sand along a line, each round would have 1 less stake than there were castaways competing. The tribe member without a stake is eliminated from the challenge. The tribe with the last person standing wins, and gets to choose two of the three prizes for rewards: Mosquito Nets, a Utility Knife, and flint.; After losing two members in the early stages of the challenge, Sanele outpaced Gareth in the final round to win the Mosquito Net and Utility Knife for Aguila. However, the following day, Sanele and Mzi were dealing with injuries from the challenge, with the atmosphere around Aguila sinking as finding food became harder to do on their island. Frustrated after yet another loss, Rana held a meeting to debrief about the challenge. Lezel questioned Jacinda on why she was chosen to sit out, despite having experience running on sand back in South Africa, over a stockier Zayn. More misfortune arose for the tribe when the high tide took over their camp, despite Ncumisa's prior warnings. Knowing that she was on the outs of Jacinda's developing majority, Ncumisa tried to use her own bonds with Jacinda's ally, Lezel, to connect better with Gareth to protect herself if Rana lost the Immunity challenge.: Immunity Challenge: With one tribe member harnessed to a swing underneath a wooden tripod structure, the remainder of the tribe must pull and navigate them above a sand pit to retrieve 7 skulls to place on pedestals at the edge of their pit. The tribe to place all 7 skulls earns wins the round. Best of three rounds, the first tribe to win 2 rounds wins Immunity.; Returning from a narrow loss, Jude's health started to worry the Aguila tribe as their food shortage worsened, while Sanele's injured shoulder left him concerned about future challenges ahead. Unable to decide who to vote out, Jude approached the tribe and volunteered to be voted out to preserve the tribe's strength. This resignation left Aguila unsure about what would happen at Tribal Council if Jude were to quit instead of being voted out. Attending Tribal Council, both Brigitte and Nico affirmed to Mark that Aguila felt reunited after Sam was voted out. However, Mzi implied to Mark that while the tribe was unified, there was someone who had volunteered to be voted out willingly. When Mark questioned the tribe about this development, Jude revealed to the host that she felt that her health was deteriorating quickly due to the food shortage on their island, and asked to be voted out to preserve Aguila's strength. With her admission to leave aired, Mark allowed Jude say her goodbyes and leave Tribal Council to return home. After Jude left, Mark informed Aguila that they still had to vote at Tribal Council despite her exit. Without having time to consult, Aguila blindsided Nico in a unanimous vote against him. After the vote was revealed though, Mark informed Aguila that since Jude had already left the game that evening, no-one else would leave tonight. Rather, at the next Tribal Council he attends, Nico would have a penalty vote against him as punishment for receiving the majority of tonight's vote. Stunned by the outcome of the vote, Nico returned to camp alongside the rest of the remaining Aguila.
4	4	"Episode 4"	Day 9-10	September 24, 2006
Nico returned to camp furious that he was nearly voted out unanimously by the tribe, despite Aguila having no time to strategize after Jude's exit at Tribal Council. Rana's living situation continued to worsen as they were unable to make fire nine days into the game, with the women working hard to lift Gareth's morale to remain in the game.: Reward Challenge: A Treasure Hunt in Tree Mail instructed two tribe members from each tribe to partake in a treasure hunt against the rising tide on their respective islands. If the two hunters find the treasure before it is washed away, they will win a unique reward for their tribe.; Mzi and Nico managed to earn a large bottle of rice for Aguila; while Gareth and Lezel secured fire in the form of flint for Rana's treasure hunt, lifting their spirits immensely with their first cooked meal in over a week.: Immunity Challenge: As two tribe members were assigned to control a large water wheel, the three remaining tribe members must construct a nine-piece metal piping puzzle to carry water to a bucket at the end of the course. Filling their tribe's bucket would cause a floating stick to rise and tip a railing to send a ball into a wok. The first tribe to land their ball into their tribe's wok wins Immunity.; Aguila managed to take over Rana during the puzzle and won back Immunity to level the numbers again. However, returning to camp, Sanele's worsening shoulder became more real as his main ally, Mzi felt that he needed to reach out to a grudge-holding Nico, if Sanele couldn't start recovering for challenges. Ncumisa saw the writing on the wall, as Danielle had managed to build trust with Jacinda much more easily than she had. However, Lezel herself was undecided whether to align with the Rana leader and Gareth, or stick with Ncumisa and Zayn, whom she trusted more. At Tribal Council, the entire tribe praised Jacinda's leadership, reflecting that the vote came down to the relationships formed since their last Tribal Council. In the end, Lezel decided to work alongside Jacinda's leadership, and helped vote Ncumisa out of the game.
5	5	"Episode 5"	Day 11-12	October 1, 2006
Zayn was left blindsided by the vote, leaving Gareth concerned as he expressed that he'd flip on Rana if given the opportunity as he had no loyalties in the tribe. While Nico kept clashing with the rest of Aguila, after Brigitte had stolen his cigarettes to keep focus on him. Mzi had lost the tribe's fishing hook, but managed to fashion a makeshift hook from one of the women's accessories to maintain his role as food provider.: Reward Challenge: One tribe member at a time are given one minute to solve a 3x3 wooden grid puzzle. With the goal of having each row and column in the puzzle adding up to 15, the first tribe to complete the puzzle wins a feast provided by Nando's.; After being told that they nearly had the answer in the first round, Rana were left frustrated and bickering among themselves after yet another challenge loss. With their camp life woes continuing as the sand flies and crabs under their shelter continued to attack them in their shelter. After staying up all night in pain due to his persistent shoulder injury, Day 12 saw Sanele be evacuated from the Aguila beach by the Medical team to assess his arm. An unconvinced Aguila were weary of his return to the tribe. Sanele's evacuation left Mzi to consider the possibility of aligning with Nico, despite his eccentric behavior clashing with the women on Aguila.: Immunity Challenge: With three tribe members buried under the sand inside a chamber, a fourth tribe member must dig their way to the chamber door to enter. Once all four tribe members are inside, they must unlock a hatch above them leading the tribe to a wooden structure. The tribe must climb through the wooden structure before reaching the ground to run past a gravestone. The first tribe to free all four members from the underground chamber and then knock over their gravestone wins Immunity.; Lezel struggled for Rana, only managing to enter her tribe's chambers shortly before Aguila managed to escape and win the challenge. Leaving Rana devastated and frustrated that they couldn't even beat a demoralized Aguila. Returning to their beach, Lezel, despite feeling responsible for the loss, approached Gareth about finally voting out Danielle. As she wanted to keep her trio with Gareth and Jacinda intact. At tribal council, Mark questioned Rana about Jacinda's leadership given their challenge record, but the entire tribe backed Jacinda's adaptable role for the tribe. In the vote, Lezel managed to keep her friend, Zayn, over Danielle. However, as Danielle had her torch extinguished, Mark summoned Sanele to Tribal Council. Reminding the tribe that Sanele had been medically evacuated that morning, Mark informed Rana that Sanele had been officially pulled from the game; creating a unique situation where he was out, yet his torch remained lit. Mark instructed Danielle to drop her buff, and claim Sanele's and his torch. Because of his evacuation, the person voted out at this Tribal Council would take his place in the game; leaving a stunned Rana watching a relieved Danielle leave Tribal Council to join an unsuspecting Aguila.
6	6	"Episode 6"	Day 13-14	October 8, 2006
Danielle's switch at the previous Tribal Council surprised Aguila when she arrived at their camp on Day 13, where she explained that Sanele's evacuation led to her arrival. Her swap sparked life in Brigitte's game, as she and the tribe were getting alienated by Nico's personality around camp. Rana hoped that Danielle left with an understanding, hoping that her swap will benefit them all at the merge.: Reward Challenge: Attached to their tribe by rope and harness, both tribes must traverse around a looped obstacle course while carrying weighted backpacks. Each tribe is given one timeout session in the challenge if they strike their tribe's respective gongs along the course. The first tribe to catch the other's last tribe member wins coffee and food seasonings for camp.; With Nico's motivation throughout the challenge, and a strategic timeout, Aguila caught up an exhausted Zayn to win reward, with Danielle feeling vindicated for the blindside that Gareth and Lezel did to her. Yet another loss exasperated Gareth's frustrations with Rana's lack of competitive spirit in challenges. Both Nico and Mzi started to notice how quickly Danielle was gravitating towards Brigitte and Vanessa, causing concerns of Aguila remaining intact for the merge.: Immunity Challenge: One at a time, a tribe member must swim out to their tribe's buoy to retrieve a block to place on a pole on the shoreline. The first tribe to retrieve all 4 blocks and cross the finish line wins Immunity.; The win left Zayn relieved, as he was aware that he was outside of the trio leading Rana, while Nico was left concerned that Aguila were going to keep Danielle over him. Mzi approached Brigitte about keeping Nico over Danielle in fear of losing another Immunity challenge before the merge, but Brigitte and Danielle noted Nico's lack of trust in Aguila. Vanessa was left undecided as she wanted to work with the women while maintaining numbers, but worried that if Mzi was the only man left, the tribe will lose more challenges before merge. At Tribal Council, Nico informed Mark that he felt the tribe never discussed strategy about Tribal Council to him. While Danielle acknowledged that she couldn't step into Sanele's shoes after his evacuation; she wanted to put her best foot forward for the Aguila tribe moving on. Despite receiving a penalty vote from the Tribal Council where Jude quit the game, Nico managed to survive Tribal Council where Brigitte and Vanessa chose original tribal loyalties over a new ally; finishing what Rana started by sending Danielle home.

== Voting history ==
	Original tribes							Switched tribes		Deadman's Island twist (Note: After being voted out, Brigitte, Mzi, Vanessa and Lezel learned that they would go to Deadman's Island and await a chance to return to the game. On Day 25 they competed in an endurance challenge where the last two standing would return to the game. Lezel and Brigitte fell and were eliminated.)					Merged tribe		
Episode	1	2	3		4	5		6	7	8	9	10	11	12		13	
Day	3	6	8		10	12		14	16	19	20	22	24	25	27	28	29
Eliminated	Don	Sam	Jude	Nico (Note: Despite Jude leaving the game at Tribal Council, Aguila were asked to vote someone out of their tribe. Nico received the majority. Mark informed the cast that Nico will receive a penalty vote against him at the next tribal council he attends instead of leaving the game.)	Ncumisa	Sanele	Danielle (Note: Due to Sanele's medical evacuation the day before, his torch was not snuffed. Rana voted Danielle out of the tribe and to their surprise, Danielle took over Sanele's torch and moved to Aguila after tribal council.)	Danielle	Nico	Brigitte	Mzi	Vanessa	Lezel	Brigitte & Lezel	Gareth	Zayn	Mzi
Vote	4–3	5–2	Quit (Note: Jude voluntarily exited the game for concerns with her health.)	4–1	4–2	Evacuated (Note: Sanele was medically evacuated from the game.)	3–2	3–2–1 (Note: Nico's extra vote against him occurred at this tribal council.)	3–1	4–3	4–2	4–1	3–1	Challenge	3–1–1	Challenge (Note: Zayn was the first to fall from the Final Four challenge and was immediately eliminated.)	Challenge (Note: Mzi lost the Sudden-Death challenge against Jacinda, instantly eliminating him.)
Voter	Votes																
Vanessa		Sam		Nico				Danielle	Nico	Lezel	Lezel	Lezel	Deadman's Island	Win	Gareth	Win	Immune
Jacinda	Don				Ncumisa		Zayn			Brigitte	Mzi	Vanessa	Lezel		Gareth	Safe	Win
Mzi		Sam		Nico				Danielle	Nico	Lezel	Lezel	Deadman's Island		Win	Gareth	Safe	Lose
Zayn	Don				Danielle		Danielle			Brigitte	Mzi	Vanessa	Lezel		Jacinda	Lose	
Gareth	Don				Ncumisa		Danielle			Brigitte	Mzi	Vanessa	Lezel		Zayn		
Lezel	Danielle				Ncumisa		Danielle			Brigitte	Mzi	Vanessa	Zayn	Lose			
Brigitte		Vanessa		Nico				Mzi	Nico	Lezel	Deadman's Island			Lose			
Nico		Sam		Brigitte				Danielle	Brigitte								
Danielle	Don				Ncumisa		Zayn	Nico									
Sanele		Sam		Nico													
Ncumisa	Danielle				Danielle												
Jude		Sam															
Sam		Vanessa															
Don	Danielle																

Jury vote
Episode	13	
Day	29	
Finalist	Vanessa	Jacinda
Votes	3–2	
Juror	Votes	
Mzi	Vanessa	
Zayn	Vanessa	
Gareth		Jacinda
Lezel		Jacinda
Brigitte	Vanessa	
