= Survivor South Africa =

- Genre: Reality competition
- Created by: Charlie Parsons
- Based on: Expedition Robinson/Survivor by Charlie Parsons
- Presented by: Mark Bayly (Season 1–2); Nico Panagio (Season 3–present)
- Starring: List of Survivor South Africa contestants
- Country of origin: South Africa
- Original language: English
- No. of seasons: 9
- No. of episodes: 147

Production
- Running time: 60 minutes (inc. adverts) (2006–2011, 2018); 70 minutes (inc. adverts) (2019); 90 minutes (inc. adverts) (2014)
- Production companies: Strix (2006–2007), Endemol South Africa (2006–14), Afrokaans Film & Television (2018–22)

Original release
- Network: M-Net
- Release: 3 September 2006 – 25 August 2022

Related
- International versions

Survivor South Africa is a South African reality game show based on the international Survivor format.

As in all versions of the show, it features group of strangers who are marooned in an isolated location, where they must provide food, water, fire and shelter for themselves. The contestants will compete in challenges to earn either a reward, or an immunity from elimination. The contestants will be progressively eliminated from the game as they are voted-off by their fellow contestants until only one remains and is given the title "Ultimate Survivor" and be awarded the grand prize of R1 million. The 9th season, titled Return of the Outcasts, concluded on 25 August 2022. As of 25 July 2023, M-Net stated that there are no plans for additional seasons at the time.

The first five seasons of the show were produced by Endemol and broadcast on M-Net. Since Season 6, the show has been produced by Afrokaans Film & Television.

The first two seasons were hosted by Mark Bayly, and from the third season Nico Panagio took over the hosting duties.

== Format ==
The show follows the same general format as the other editions of Survivor. To begin, the players are split into two or three tribes, are taken to a remote isolated location and are forced to live off the land with meagre supplies for a period of several weeks. Frequent physical and mental challenges are used to pit the tribes against each other for rewards, such as food or luxuries, or for immunity, forcing the other tribe to attend Tribal Council, where they must vote one of their tribemates out of the game by secret ballot.

About halfway through the game, the tribes are merged into a single tribe, and challenges are on an individual basis; winning immunity prevents that player from being voted out. Most players that are voted out during this stage become members of the Tribal Council Jury. When only two or three players remain, the Final Tribal Council is held. The finalists plead their case to the Jury as to why they should win the game. The jurors then have the opportunity to interrogate the finalists before casting their vote for which finalist should be awarded the title of "Ultimate Survivor" and wins the grand prize of R1 Million (the returning player edition Return of the Outcasts offered a R2 Million prize).

In addition to being eliminated by a Tribal Council Vote, the Castaways can also elect to leave the game at any time, either if they are finding the game or the experience too difficult, or to attend to a personal emergency outside of the game. Castaways who are injured can be removed from the game if the medical staff assess their condition and decides that they are not fit to continue in the game.

Like other editions of the show, the South Africa edition has introduced numerous adaptations, or twists, on the core rules to prevent players from over-relying on strategies that succeeded in prior seasons or other editions of the show. The titular Island of Secrets and the Immunity Island as well as The Outpost on Return of the Outcasts exile players for a predetermined amount of time while offering dilemmas and decisions that may help or hinder their game. Other twists include the non-playing Captains in Champions, kidnappings, tribe expansions and shuffles. There may also be twists that affect the game format for a particular round (such as the Tied Destinies twist included on Immunity Island, in which the players had to play in pairs) Voting advantages and disadvantages, and in the first season, Panama included Deadman's Island where contestants voted out after the merge was isolated from the game until an opportunity to return arose.

== Seasons ==
List of Survivor South Africa seasons
No.	Season	Season premiere	Season finale	Location	Days	Castaways	Initial Tribes	Winner	Runner(s) up		Final vote
1	Survivor South Africa: Panama	3 September 2006	26 November 2006	Pearl Islands, Panama	29	14	Two predetermined tribes of seven	Vanessa Marawa	Jacinda Louw		3-2
2	Survivor South Africa: Malaysia	22 August 2007	14 November 2007	Johor, Malaysia	27	16	Two tribes of eight, based on random draw in the marooning challenge.	Lorette Mostert	Grant Clarke		3-2
3	Survivor South Africa: Santa Carolina	20 January 2010	21 April 2010	Santa Carolina, Mozambique	27	18	Two tribes of nine Celebrities, determined by a schoolyard pick by two Exiled players.	Perle "GiGi" van Schalkwyk	Ashley Hayden		6-3
4	Survivor South Africa: Maldives	24 February 2011	26 May 2011	Gan, Addu Atoll, Maldives	27	19	Two tribes of nine, determined by two separate random draws between the 'Celebs' and 'Plebs'. A 10th "Pleb" was initially voted out before the 'Celebs' and 'Plebs' met.	Hykie Berg	Letshego Moshoeu		8-3
5	Survivor South Africa: Champions	19 January 2014	18 May 2014	Johor, Malaysia	27	20	Two tribes of ten, selected in a schoolyard pick by two sporting champions acting as non-playing tribe captain.	Graham Jenneker	Buhle Madlala	Sivu Xabanisa	5-3-2
6	Survivor South Africa: Philippines	3 May 2018	16 August 2018	El Nido, Palawan, Philippines	39	18	Two predetermined tribes of nine	Tom Swartz	Jeanne Michel		6-1
7	Survivor South Africa: Island of Secrets	16 May 2019	12 September 2019	Samoa	39	21	Three predetermined tribes of seven	Robert Bentele	Nicole Capper	Durão Mariano	6-4-0
8	Survivor South Africa: Immunity Island	3 June 2021	16 September 2021	Wild Coast, Eastern Cape, South Africa	39	20	Two tribes of ten, based on random draw	Nicole Wilmans	Anela Majozi		8-1
9	Survivor South Africa: Return of the Outcasts	18 July 2022	25 August 2022	Sunshine Coast, Eastern Cape, South Africa	39	20	Two tribes of ten returning players divided by past placements: Pre-Merge vs. Merge	Dino Paulo	Shane Hattingh		7-2

== Production ==
=== Locations ===
Continent	Locations		Season number(s)
Africa	Eastern Cape	Wild Coast	8
Africa	Eastern Cape	Sunshine Coast	9
Africa	Mozambique	Santa Carolina	3
Asia	Malaysia	Johor	2, 5
Asia	Maldives	Addu Atoll	4
Asia	Philippines	El Nido, Palawan	6
Central America	Panama	Pearl Islands	1
Oceania	Samoa	Upolu	7

== International broadcast ==
The series airs on the following channels outside of Africa.

- In Australia, seasons 6 & 7 were made available to stream on 10 Play in September 2020. Seasons 8 & 9 were available to stream on 10 Play on the day after each episode had aired on M-Net.
- In the United Kingdom, seasons 6, 7, and 8 are available on Amazon Prime Video.
- In the United States, the sixth, seventh and eighth seasons aired on Paramount+ but are not currently available as of 14 February 2022 due to the service losing streaming rights.

== See also ==
- Survivor Africa
- Survivor (American TV series)
- Australian Survivor
- Survivor (British TV series)
- Survivor NZ
