= Rob Bentele =

South African reality television personality winner

- Born: Robert Bentele; April 13, 1990 (age 36); Natal, South Africa (1984–1994)
- Occupations: Reality television personality, videographer, political candidate
- Known for: Winner of Survivor South Africa: Island of Secrets
- Political party: Democratic Alliance (since 2026)

Robert Bentele is a South African politician and reality television personality, known for winning the seventh season of the Survivor South Africa, titled Survivor South Africa: Island of Secrets in 2019. He later competed on Survivor: Australia v The World.

== Early life and career ==
Rob Bentele was born in KwaZulu-Natal and grew up in Richards Bay. He was born to a Zulu mother and an Austrian father. He attended Felixton College and matriculated in 2007. Before his appearance on Survivor South Africa, Bentele worked as an events videographer and creative professional. He also trained in mixed martial arts and meditation, which he has credited for helping him develop the endurance and mental discipline that later influenced his gameplay strategy.

== Survivor South Africa ==
=== Island of Secrets (2019) ===
Bentele competed in Survivor South Africa: Island of Secrets, which aired in 2019 on M-Net. After 39 days of competition, he was crowned the Sole Survivor and won the R1 million grand prize.

He reached the final Tribal Council alongside Nicole Capper and Durão Mariano, ultimately securing the jury vote victory. Bentele played a central role in the influential “Amigos” alliance, which was widely credited with shaping the season’s strategic direction. Analysts and fans have frequently cited his control over alliance structures and voting strategies as a defining feature of the season. In addition to winning the main competition, Bentele also won the viewer-voted fan favorite award, making him one of the few contestants in the franchise to secure both titles during a single season.

Following his victory, Bentele was selected to represent South Africa in international Survivor franchise programming, further extending his recognition within the global reality television community.

== Political career ==
In 2026, Bentele entered local politics, announcing his candidacy as a ward councillor candidate in the uMhlathuze Local Municipality in KwaZulu-Natal under the Democratic Alliance. His entry into politics generated media coverage due to his transition from reality television to public service. On August 28, 2026, Rob posted on Instagram that he was running as the DA's mayoral candidate for the uMhlathuze Local Municipality in the upcoming 2026 South African municipal elections, scheduled for November 4, 2026.

== Personal life ==
In 2021 Bentele developed a free anti-gender violence app which was endorsed by Zulu King, Misuzulu kaZwelithi.
