= Afrokaans Film & Television =

South African television production company

afrOkaans
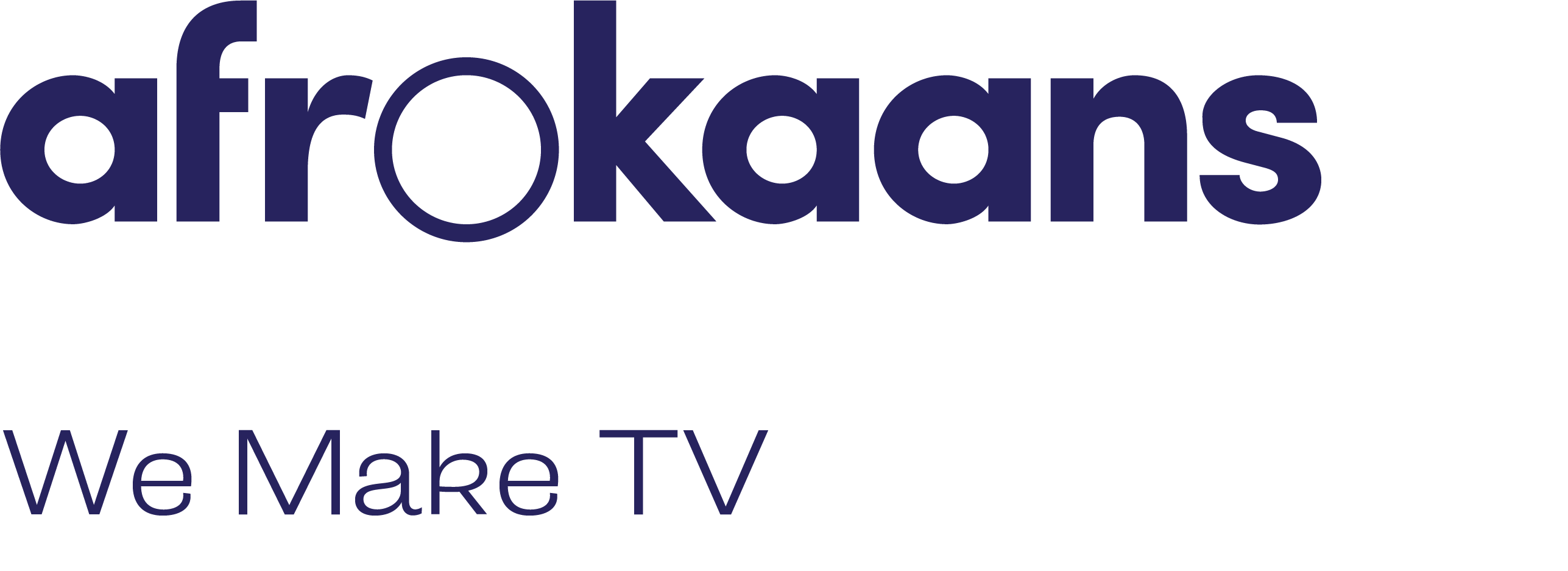
- Industry: Television production Television Production Facilitation
- Founded: January 1, 2007; 19 years ago
- Headquarters: Cape Town, South Africa
- Website: afrokaans.co.za

afrOkaans is a South African production company of scripted and non-scripted television based in Cape Town, responsible for programmes such as Power Couple South Africa and the SAFTA award-winning Survivor South Africa "Hoor My, Sien My, Soen My", Die Kliek & "Mooi". afrOkaans also produced a drama series called 'Duiwelspoort' for Netwerk 24.

afrOkaans has produced an array of television and film ranging from high-end formats like Survivor South Africa and Power Couple South Africa to lifestyle shows and celebrity news shows. afrOkaans also runs a facilitation arm of the business, with facilitations for the BBC and Amazon Prime amongst some of its clients. In addition, afrOkaans has developed over 30 new formats with successful executions of most of these formats.
