= Survivor South Africa: Malaysia =

- Season 2
- Presented by: Mark Bayly
- No. of days: 27
- No. of castaways: 16
- Winner: Lorette Mostert
- Runner-up: Grant Clarke
- Location: Johor, Malaysia
- No. of episodes: 13

Release
- Original network: M-Net
- Original release: 22 August – 14 November 2007

Additional information
- Filming dates: May 2007 – June 2007

Season chronology
- ← Previous; Panama Next → Santa Carolina

Survivor South Africa: Malaysia is the second season of the reality television show Survivor South Africa. The series is very similar to the American version of the show, with two teams (and later one group) of contestants vying for a large sum of money while stranded in a remote location. Each episode, one contestant is voted off of the show by his or her comrades, whittling the group down until only one survivor remains.

Many changes were announced for the second season by M-Net, which airs the show. This included the addition of two contestants, a shorter filming period (27 days), the change in location (Johor, Malaysia), and a pre-show vote by South African citizens to choose one of the contestants. However, the show's format remained much the same, with the prize set at 1,000,000 Rand. Mark Bayly hosted this season.

The application process ended on 2 April 2007. According to M-Net's website, two thirds of the entries in 2007 were from males. The percentage of applicants in the 40-59 age group was also higher than in 2006, and the 20 oldest applicants were 77 years old. This may quell another concern that emerged in the first season: that all of the contestants had backgrounds that were too similar. The 16th contestant, Lorette Mostert, was voted in by South Africans via M-Net's website () between 23 and 30 April 2007. Filming began in mid-May and ended in June. The show was initially broadcast 22 August – 14 November 2007.

== Contestants ==
One of the castaways – Lorette Mostert – was chosen by fans as a wildcard.

List of Survivor South Africa: Malaysia contestants
Contestant	Original tribe	Switched tribe	Merged tribe	Finish
Nomfundo Vilokazi; 27, Pretoria, Gauteng	Iban			1st Voted Out; Day 3
Nicola Windt; 37; Harding, KwaZulu-Natal	Bajau			2nd Voted Out; Day 5
Viwe Soga; 23, Melrose, Gauteng	Iban			3rd Voted Out; Day 7
Elsie Smith; 24, Sunninghill, Gauteng	Bajau	Iban		4th Voted Out; Day 9
Nichal Ramchander; 25, Phoenix, KwaZulu-Natal	Bajau (Note: Nichal fell first in a marooning challenge and was exiled until the first immunity challenge where he would join the tribe who won.)	Bajau		5th Voted Out; Day 11
Rijesh Govender; 30, Lyndhurst, Gauteng	Bajau	Iban		6th Voted Out; Day 13
Lisa Atkinson; 21, Durban, KwaZulu-Natal	Iban	Bajau		7th Voted Out; Day 15
Irshaad Ally; 29, Maitland, Western Cape	Iban	Iban		8th Voted Out; Day 17
Hein Vosloo; 47, Manzengwenya, KwaZulu-Natal	Bajau	Bajau	Empu	9th Voted Out; Day 19
Dyke Higginson; 28, Marina Beach, KwaZulu-Natal	Bajau	Iban	Empu	10th Voted Out; 1st Jury Member; Day 21
Angela Beck; 23, Krugersdorp, Gauteng	Bajau	Bajau	Empu	11th Voted Out; 2nd Jury Member; Day 23
Angie Bennett; 30, Mowbray, Western Cape	Iban	Iban	Empu	12th Voted Out; 3rd Jury Member; Day 25
Mandla Mbau; 36, Glen Marais, Gauteng	Iban	Bajau	Empu	Eliminated (Note: The Final Four had to perform in an endurance challenge; the first to fall joined the jury while the winner of the challenge would automatically be in the Final Tribal Council. Mandla was the first person to fall and was eliminated.); 4th Jury Member; Day 26
Amanda Hoosen; 29, Weltevredenpark, Gauteng	Bajau	Iban	Empu	13th Voted Out; 5th Jury Member; Day 27
Grant Clark; 35, Tokai, Western Cape	Iban	Bajau	Empu	Runner-up; Day 27
Lorette Mostert; 36, Middelburg, Mpumalanga	Iban	Bajau	Empu	Sole Survivor; Day 27

== Season summary ==
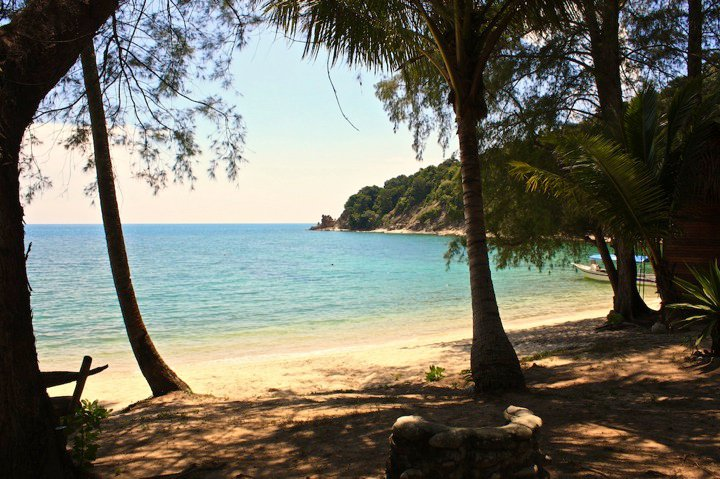
The season was filmed in Johor in Malaysia.

With a larger cast of 16 players, the season began with two tribes of eight, Bajau and Iban. Bajau started off the game divided between two factions; those who worked harder to build and look after their camp, and the rest who were more interested in the strategic game. The strategic Bajau united under Elsie and Rijesh to vote out the oldest female worker of the tribe, Nicole, to keep the begrudging provider of the tribe, Hein, to keep the tribe looked after for challenges. At Iban, an alliance between Grant, Lorette (the public wildcard winner), Mandla, Angie, and Viwe were starting to form, until the Malaysian conditions led to Viwe becoming erratic about his allegiances, sending him home early over the Iban outsider, Lisa.

A sudden tribe shuffle at the fourth immunity challenge saw Bajau become a physically overpowering tribe, with Elsie being injured at the challenge where she needed immediate medical attention. The loss also saw the new Iban tribe be sent to a daytime Tribal Council immediately after the challenge, where her own original Bajau allies chose to vote Elsie out to make sure she got the medical intervention she needed despite being in the majority. With his biggest ally gone, Rijesh was voted out shortly after as fellow Bajau, Amanda, grew suspicious of his strategic prowess. The new Bajau saw Grant and Hein agree to a mutual truce to help pick off Nichal and Lisa as tribe and alliance outsiders. Shortly before the merge, an outnumbered Angie in the new Iban tribe started to get restless, and sided with the Bajau originals to vote out Irshaad, as his energetic behaviour kept disrupting camp life and yielding challenge losses for Iban.

The tribes merged on Day 18 to form Empu, with 4 original Bajau and Iban members sticking to their original tribal lines. A tie-breaker challenge between Hein and Lorette saw Hein fumble his way out of the game, giving the Iban alliance majority. Fellow Bajau, Dyke and Angela, were sent to the jury back-to-back, until at the Final 5, Angie's boredom with her alliance's control of the merge started to alienate Lorette and her closest ally, Mandla. Bringing in Amanda, Lorette and Mandla blindsided their own alliance to take out Angie for her unpredictable loyalties. On Day 26, the Final Four competed in another balancing endurance challenge (repeating the Final Four challenge in Panama), where Mandla shockingly fell into the water first, sending him to the jury, while Lorette won immunity for the penultimate Tribal Council. Despite giving Amanda an opportunity to plead her case over her alliance leader, Grant, Lorette voted out Amanda, concerned that her status as the last surviving Bajau member would give her a strong case at Final Tribal Council.

The Final Tribal Council saw the jury interrogate Grant's strategic game as the leader of the Iban alliance, pointing out that Lorette never broke her loyalties with Mandla while keeping up a good work ethic in her tribes throughout the game. In the end, the jury decided to reward Lorette for her general ethic around camp and her need as a police officer for the grand prize financially, over Grant, making Lorette South Africa's second Ultimate Survivor.

Challenge winners and eliminations by episode
Episode		Challenge winner(s)		Eliminated	Finish
No.	Original air date	Reward	Immunity	Eliminated	Finish
1	2007-08-22	Bajau		Nomfundo	1st Voted Out; Day 3
2	2007-08-29	Iban	Iban	Nicola	2nd Voted Out; Day 5
3	2007-09-05	Iban	Bajau	Viwe	3rd Voted Out; Day 7
4	2007-09-12	Bajau	Bajau	Elsie	4th Voted Out; Day 9
5	2007-09-19	Iban	Iban	Nichal	5th Voted Out; Day 11
6	2007-09-26	Bajau	Bajau	Rijesh	6th Voted Out; Day 13
7	2007-10-03	Iban	Iban	Lisa	7th Voted Out; Day 15
8	2007-10-11	Iban	Bajau	Irshaad	8th Voted Out; Day 17
9	2007-10-18	Mandla	Dyke	Hein	9th Voted Out; Day 19
10	2007-10-24	Dyke [Amanda]	Mandla	Dyke	10th Voted Out; 1st jury member Day 21
11	2007-10-31	Mandla	Angie	Angela	11th Voted Out; 2nd jury member Day 23
12	2007-11-08	Mandla	Lorette	Angie	12th Voted Out; 3rd jury member Day 25
13	2007-11-14		Lorette	Mandla	Eliminated; 4th jury member Day 26
13	2007-11-14		Lorette	Amanda	13th Voted Out; 5th jury member Day 27
13	2007-11-14			Jury vote	
13	2007-11-14			Grant	Runner-Up; Day 27
13	2007-11-14			Lorette	Ultimate Survivor; Day 27

== Voting history ==
	Original tribes			Switched tribes					Merged tribe						
Episode	1	2	3	4	5	6	7	8	9	10		11	12	13	
Day	3	5	7	9	11	13	15	17	19		21	23	25	26	27
Eliminated	Nomfundo	Nicola	Viwe	Elsie	Nichal	Rijesh	Lisa	Irshaad	Tie (Note: The Tribal Council vote resulted in a tie. Per the rules, the tied castaways must win a timed challenge to determine who remains in the game.)	Hein	Dyke	Angela	Angie	Mandla	Amanda
Votes	4–3–1	5–3	5–2	5–1	6–1	4–1	5–1	3–1	4–4	Challenge (Note: Hein lost to Lorette in the tiebreaker challenge.)	4–2–1	4–2	3–2	Challenge (Note: Mandla was the first to fall in Final Immunity Challenge and was immediately eliminated.)	1–0
Voter	Vote														
Lorette	Lisa		Viwe		Nichal		Lisa		Hein	Win	Dyke	Angela	Angie	Win	Amanda
Grant	Nomfundo		Viwe		Nichal		Lisa		Hein		Dyke	Angela	Amanda	Safe	None (Note: Amanda and Grant were not eligible to vote as the only eligible players they could vote for were each other.)
Amanda		Nicola		Elsie		Rijesh		Irshaad	Lorette		Grant	Grant	Angie	Safe	None
Mandla	Lisa		Viwe		Nichal		Lisa		Hein		Dyke	Angela	Angie	Lose	
Angie	Nomfundo		Viwe	Elsie		Rijesh		Irshaad	Hein		Dyke	Angela	Amanda		
Angela		Nicola			Nichal		Lisa		Lorette		Grant	Grant			
Dyke		Elsie		Elsie		Rijesh		Irshaad	Lorette		Angie				
Hein		Elsie			Nichal		Lisa		Lorette	Lose					
Irshaad	Nomfundo		Lisa	Elsie		Rijesh		Angie							
Lisa	Grant		Viwe		Nichal		Hein								
Rijesh		Nicola		Elsie		Amanda									
Nichal		Nicola			Lisa										
Elsie		Nicola		Angie											
Viwe	Nomfundo		Lisa												
Nicola		Elsie													
Nomfundo	Lisa														

Jury vote
Episode	13	
Day	27	
Finalist	Lorette	Grant
Votes	3–2	
Juror	Vote	
Amanda		Grant
Mandla	Lorette	
Angie	Lorette	
Angela		Grant
Dyke	Lorette	
