= Entertainment =

Activity that holds attention or gives pleasure

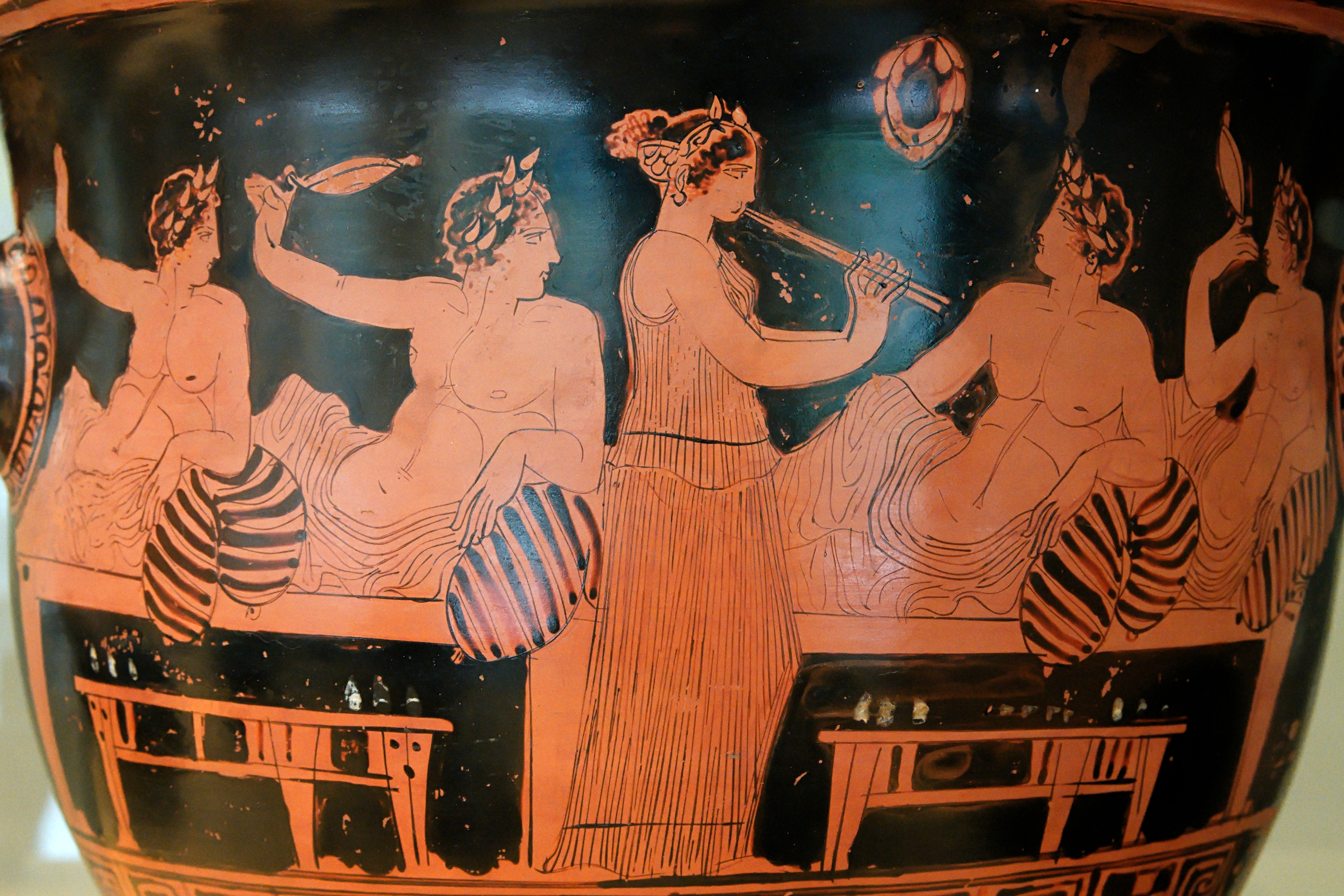
Banqueters playing Kottabos and a girl playing the aulos, Greece (c. 420 BCE). Banqueting and music have continued to be two important entertainments since ancient times.

Entertainment is a form of activity that holds the attention and interest of an audience or gives pleasure and delight. It can be an idea or a task, but it is more commonly one of the activities or events developed over thousands of years specifically to engage an audience.

Although people's attention is captured by different things due to individual preferences, most forms of entertainment are recognisable and familiar. Storytelling, music, drama, dance, and various kinds of performance exist in all cultures, were supported in royal courts, and developed into sophisticated forms over time, eventually becoming available to the general public. Modern times have accelerated this process through an entertainment industry that records and sells entertainment products. Entertainment can be adapted to suit any scale, ranging from an individual choosing private entertainment from an enormous array of pre-recorded products, to a banquet for two, to parties of any size with music and dance, to performances for thousands, and even global audiences.

The experience of being entertained is strongly associated with amusement, so one common understanding is fun and laughter, although many entertainments serve serious purposes. This can occur in various forms of ceremony, celebration, religious festival, or satire. Therefore, what appears as entertainment may also be a means of achieving insight or intellectual growth.

A key aspect of entertainment is the audience, which transforms a private recreation or leisure activity into entertainment. The audience may have a passive role, as in people watching a play, opera, television show, or film; or an active role, as in games, where participant and audience roles can interchange. Entertainment can be public or private, involving formal, scripted performances such as theatre or concerts, or unscripted and spontaneous, as with children's games. Most forms of entertainment have persisted for centuries, evolving due to cultural, technological, and fashion changes, as seen with stage magic. Films and video games, though using newer media, continue to tell stories, present drama, and play music. Festivals devoted to music, film, or dance entertain audiences over consecutive days.

Some entertainment, such as public executions, is now illegal in most countries. Activities like fencing or archery, once used in hunting or war, have become spectator sports. Similarly, other activities, such as cooking, have evolved into performances among professionals, staged as global competitions, and broadcast for entertainment. What is entertaining for one group or individual may be considered work or cruelty by another.

Familiar forms of entertainment can cross over into different media and have demonstrated seemingly unlimited potential for creative remix, ensuring the continuity and longevity of many themes, images, and structures.

== Etymology ==
The Oxford English Dictionary gives Latin and French origins for the word "entertain", including inter (among) + tenir (to hold) as derivations, giving translations of "to hold mutually" or "to hold intertwined" and "to engage, keep occupied, the attention, thoughts, or time (of a person)". It also provides words like "merry-making", "pleasure", and "delight", as well as "to receive as a guest and show hospitality to". It cites a 1490 usage by William Caxton.

The sense of the verb "to entertain" meaning to "gratify, amuse" developed in the 1620s.

== Psychology and philosophy ==
Entertainment can be distinguished from other activities such as education and marketing even though they have learned how to use the appeal of entertainment to achieve their different goals. Sometimes entertainment can be a mixture of both. The importance and impact of entertainment are recognised by scholars, and its increasing sophistication has influenced practices in other fields such as museology.

Psychologists say the function of media entertainment is "the attainment of gratification". No other results or measurable benefits are usually expected from it (except perhaps the final score in a sporting event). This is in contrast to education (which is designed with the purpose of developing understanding or helping people to learn) and marketing (which aims to encourage people to purchase commercial products). However, the distinctions become blurred when education seeks to be more "entertaining" and entertainment or marketing seek to be more "educational". Such mixtures are often known by the neologisms "edutainment" or "infotainment". The psychology of entertainment as well as of learning has been applied to all these fields. Some education-entertainment is a serious attempt to combine the best features of the two. Some people are entertained by others' pain or the idea of their unhappiness (schadenfreude).

An entertainment might go beyond gratification and produce some insight in its audience. Entertainment may skillfully consider universal philosophical questions such as "What does it mean to be human?", "What is the right thing to do?", or "How do I know what I know?" "The meaning of life", for example, is the subject in a wide range of entertainment forms, including film, music and literature. Questions such as these drive many narratives and dramas, whether they are presented in the form of a story, film, play, poem, book, dance, comic, or game. Dramatic examples include Shakespeare's influential play Hamlet, whose hero articulates these concerns in poetry; and films, such as The Matrix, which explores the nature of knowledge and was released worldwide. Novels give great scope for investigating these themes while they entertain their readers. An example of a creative work that considers philosophical questions so entertainingly that it has been presented in a very wide range of forms is The Hitchhiker's Guide to the Galaxy. Originally a radio comedy, this story became so popular that it has also appeared as a novel, film, television series, stage show, comic, audiobook, LP record, adventure game and online game; its ideas became popular references (see Phrases from The Hitchhiker's Guide to the Galaxy) and have been translated into many languages. Its themes encompass the meaning of life, as well as "the ethics of entertainment, artificial intelligence, multiple worlds, God, and philosophical method".

== History ==
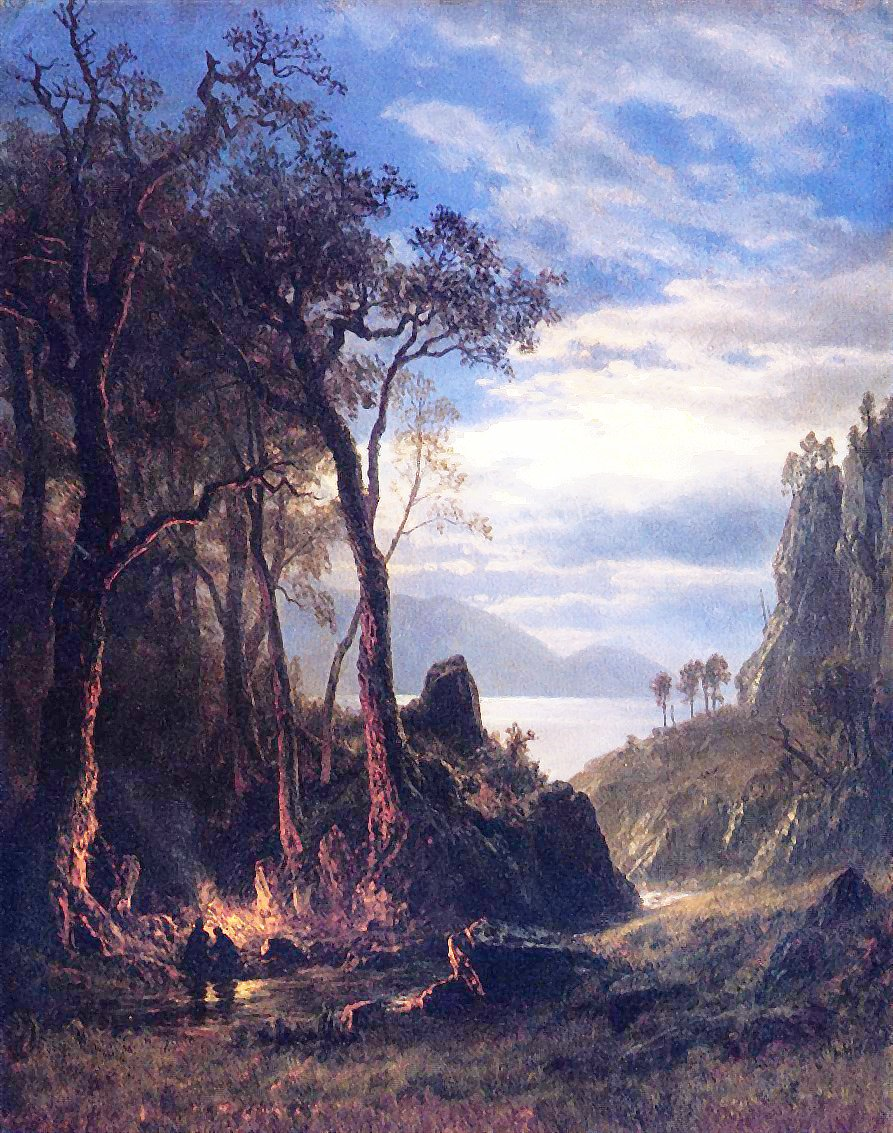
Albert Bierstadt's The Campfire depicts storytelling, a universal form of entertainment

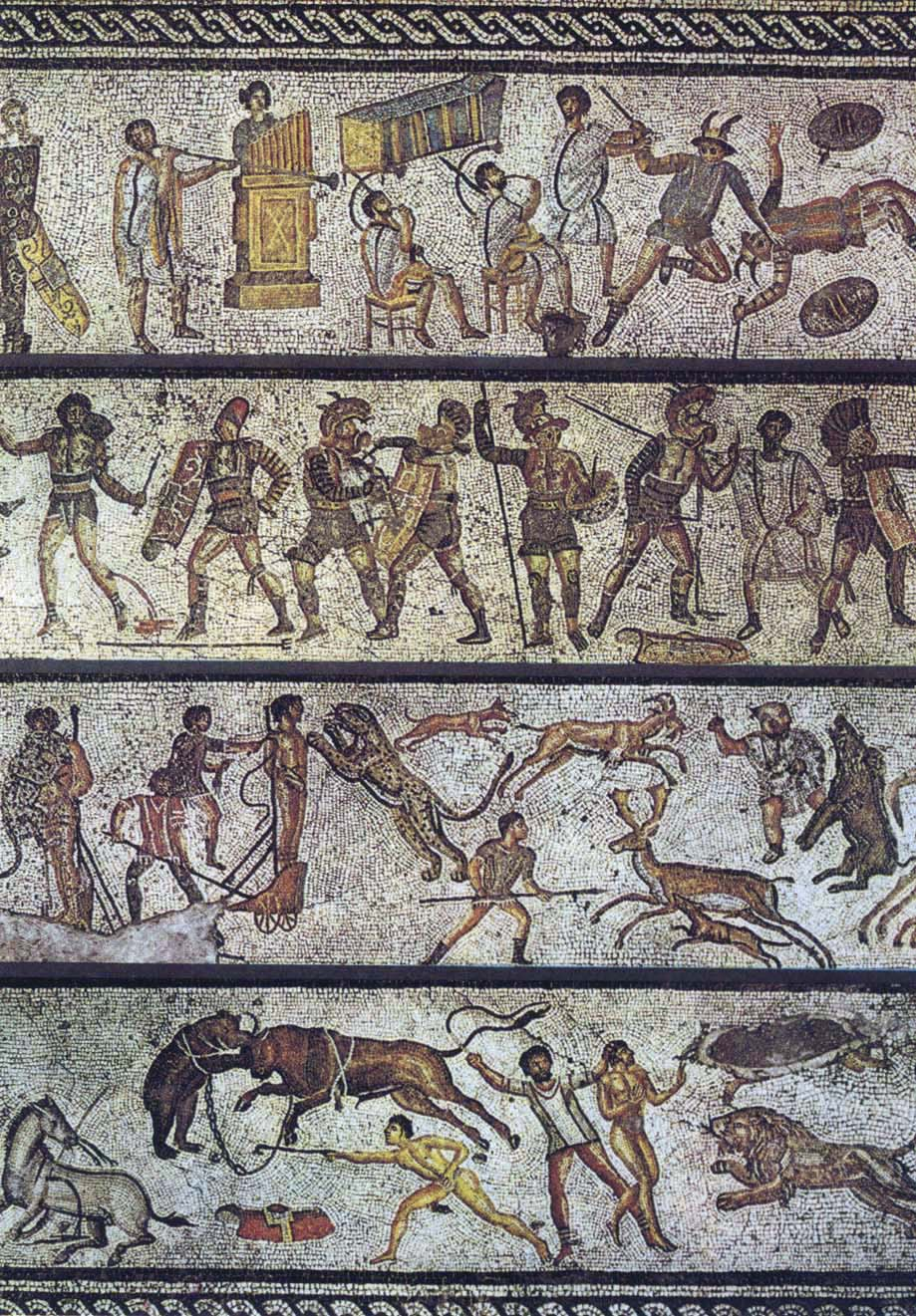
Mosaic showing Roman entertainments that would have been offered at the gladiatorial games, from the 1st century

The "ancient craft of communicating events and experiences, using words, images, sounds and gestures" by telling a story is not only the means by which people passed on their cultural values and traditions and history from one generation to another, but it has been an important part of most forms of entertainment ever since the earliest times. Stories are still told in the early forms, for example, around a fire while camping, or when listening to the stories of another culture as a tourist. "The earliest storytelling sequences we possess, now of course, committed to writing, were undoubtedly originally a speaking from mouth to ear and their force as entertainment derived from the very same elements we today enjoy in films and novels." Storytelling is an activity that has evolved and developed "toward variety". Many entertainments, including storytelling but especially music and drama, remain familiar but have developed into a wide variety of forms to suit a very wide range of personal preferences and cultural expression. Many types are blended or supported by other forms. For example, drama, stories and banqueting (or dining) are commonly enhanced by music; sport and games are incorporated into other activities to increase appeal. Some may have evolved from serious or necessary activities (such as running and jumping) into competition and then become entertainment. It is said, for example, that pole vaulting

may have originated in the Netherlands, where people used long poles to vault over wide canals rather than wear out their clogs walking miles to the nearest bridge. Others maintain that pole vaulting was used in warfare to vault over fortress walls during battle.

The equipment for such sports has become increasingly sophisticated. Vaulting poles, for example, were originally made from woods such as ash, hickory or hazel; in the 19th century bamboo was used and in the 21st century poles can be made of carbon fibre. Other activities, such as walking on stilts, are still seen in circus performances in the 21st century. Gladiatorial combats, also known as "gladiatorial games", popular during Roman times, provide a good example of an activity that is a combination of sport, punishment, and entertainment.

Changes to what is regarded as entertainment can occur in response to cultural or historical shifts. Hunting wild animals, for example, was introduced into the Roman Empire from Carthage and became a popular public entertainment and spectacle, supporting an international trade in wild animals.

Entertainment also evolved into different forms and expressions as a result of social upheavals such as wars and revolutions. During the Chinese Cultural Revolution, for example, Revolutionary opera was sanctioned by the Communist Party and World War I, the Great Depression and the Russian Revolution all affected entertainment.

Relatively minor changes to the form and venue of an entertainment continue to come and go as they are affected by the period, fashion, culture, technology, and economics. For example, a story told in dramatic form can be presented in an open-air theatre, a music hall, a cinema, a multiplex, or, as technological possibilities advanced, via a personal electronic device such as a tablet computer. Entertainment is provided for mass audiences in purpose-built structures such as a theatre, auditorium, or stadium. One of the most famous venues in the Western world, the Colosseum, "dedicated AD 80 with a hundred days of games, held fifty thousand spectators", and in it audiences "enjoyed blood sport with the trappings of stage shows". Spectacles, competitions, races, and sports were once presented in this purpose-built arena as public entertainment. New stadia continue to be built to suit the ever more sophisticated requirements of global audiences.

=== Court entertainment ===
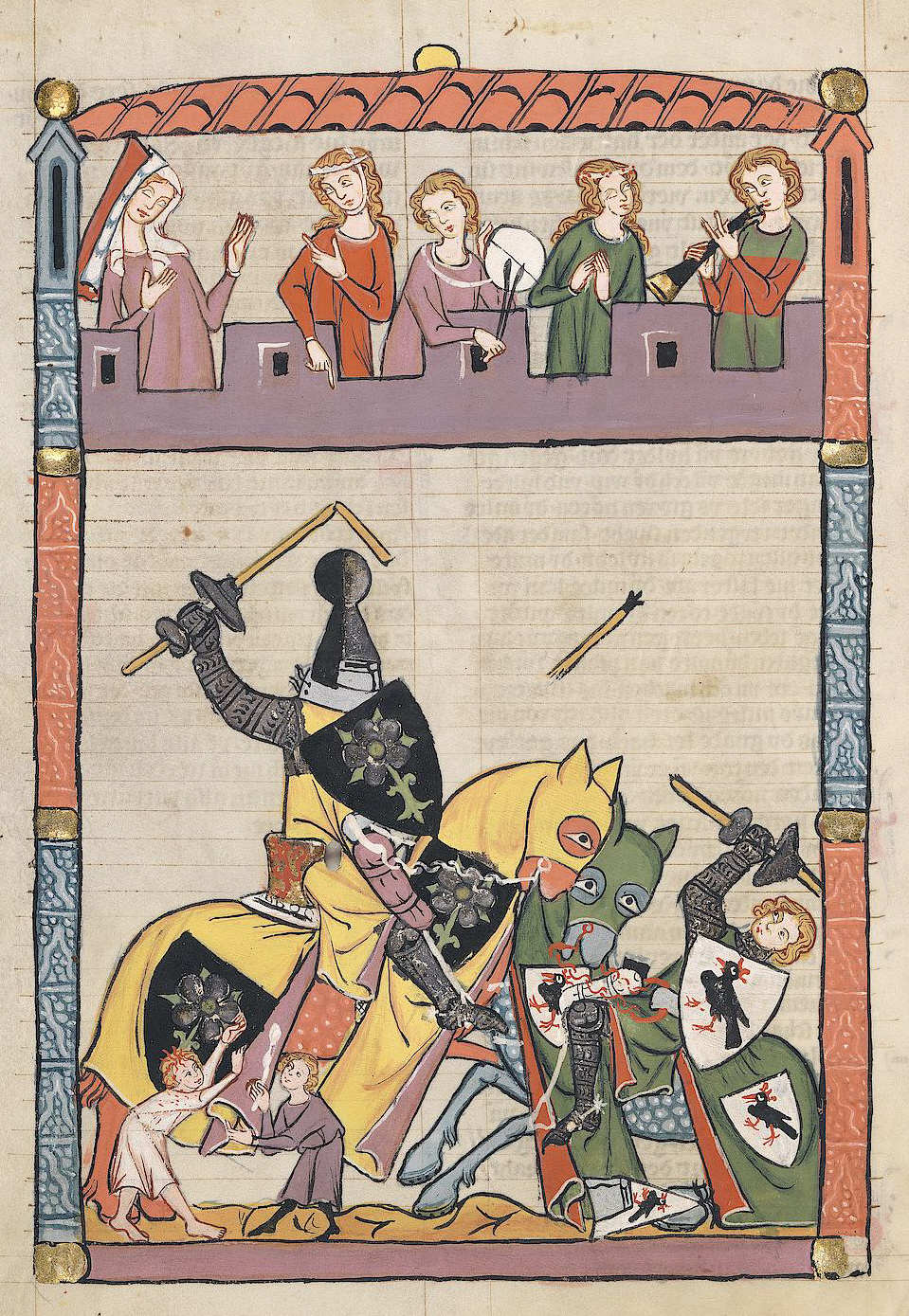
Tournament before an audience and musicians (14th century)

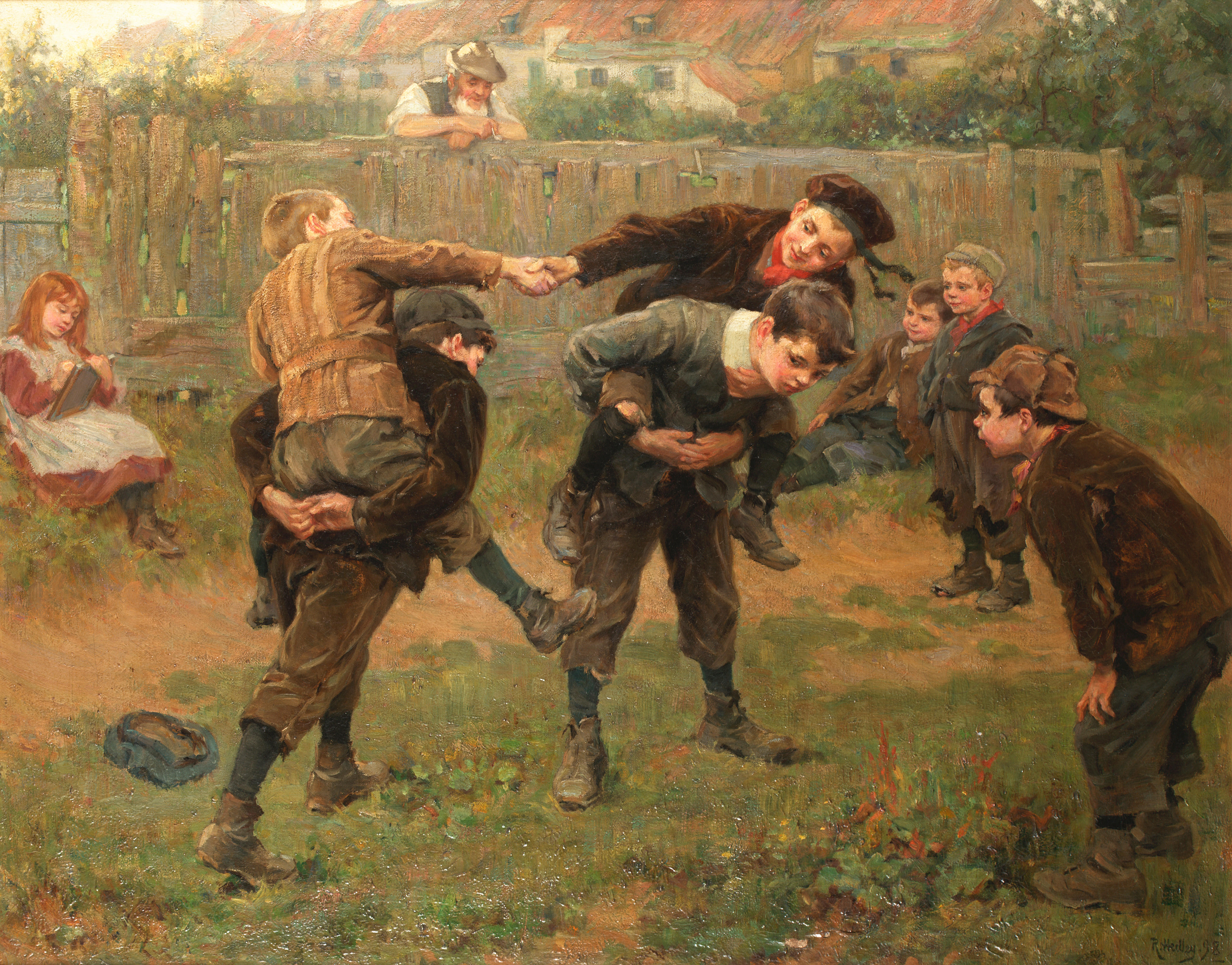
Ralph Hedley The Tournament (1898) Children adapting a courtly entertainment

Imperial and royal courts have provided training grounds and support for professional entertainers, with different cultures using palaces, castles and forts in different ways. In the Mayan city-states, for example, "spectacles often took place in large plazas in front of palaces; the crowds gathered either there or in designated places from which they could watch at a distance." Court entertainments also crossed cultures. For example, the durbar was introduced to India by the Mughals, and passed onto the British Empire, which then followed Indian tradition: "institutions, titles, customs, ceremonies by which a Maharaja or Nawab were installed ... the exchange of official presents ... the order of precedence", for example, were "all inherited from ... the Emperors of Delhi". In Korea, the "court entertainment dance" was "originally performed in the palace for entertainment at court banquets."

Court entertainment often moved from being associated with the court to more general use among commoners. This was the case with "masked dance-dramas" in Korea, which "originated in conjunction with village shaman rituals and eventually became largely an entertainment form for commoners". Nautch dancers in the Mughal Empire performed in Indian courts and palaces. Another evolution, similar to that from courtly entertainment to common practice, was the transition from religious ritual to secular entertainment, as happened during the Goryeo dynasty with the Narye festival. Originally "solely religious or ritualistic, a secular component was added at the conclusion". Former courtly entertainments, such as jousting, often also survived in children's games.

In some courts, such as those during the Byzantine Empire, the genders were segregated among the upper classes, so that "at least before the period of the Komnenoi" (1081–1185) men were separated from women at ceremonies where there was entertainment such as receptions and banquets.

Court ceremonies, palace banquets and the spectacles associated with them have been used not only to entertain but also to demonstrate wealth and power. Such events reinforce the relationship between ruler and ruled; between those with power and those without, serving to "dramatise the differences between ordinary families and that of the ruler". This is the case as much for traditional courts as it is for contemporary ceremonials, such as the Hong Kong handover ceremony in 1997, at which an array of entertainments (including a banquet, a parade, fireworks, a festival performance and an art spectacle) were put to the service of highlighting a change in political power. Court entertainments were typically performed for royalty and courtiers as well as "for the pleasure of local and visiting dignitaries". Royal courts, such as the Korean one, also supported traditional dances. In Sudan, musical instruments such as the so-called "slit" or "talking" drums, once "part of the court orchestra of a powerful chief", had multiple purposes: they were used to make music; "speak" at ceremonies; mark community events; send long-distance messages; and call men to hunt or war.

Courtly entertainments also demonstrate the complex relationship between entertainer and spectator: individuals may be either an entertainer or part of the audience, or they may swap roles even during the course of one entertainment. In the court at the Palace of Versailles, "thousands of courtiers, including men and women who inhabited its apartments, acted as both performers and spectators in daily rituals that reinforced the status hierarchy".

Like court entertainment, royal occasions such as coronations and weddings provided opportunities to entertain both the aristocracy and the people. For example, the splendid 1595 Accession Day celebrations of Queen Elizabeth I offered tournaments and jousting and other events performed "not only before the assembled court, in all their finery, but also before thousands of Londoners eager for a good day's entertainment. Entry for the day's events at the Tiltyard in Whitehall was set at 12d".

=== Public punishment ===
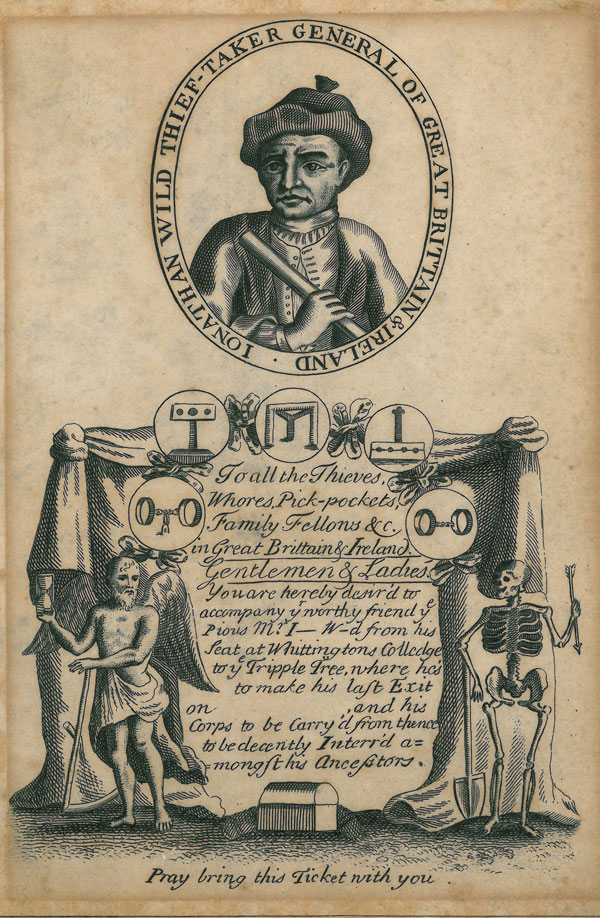
Ticket for the execution of Jonathan Wild (1725)

Although most forms of entertainment have evolved and continued over time, some once-popular forms are no longer as acceptable. For example, during earlier centuries in Europe, watching or participating in the punishment of criminals or social outcasts was an accepted and popular form of entertainment. Many forms of public humiliation also offered local entertainment in the past. Even capital punishment, such as hanging and beheading, offered to the public as a warning, was also regarded partly as entertainment. Capital punishments that lasted longer, such as stoning and drawing and quartering, afforded a greater public spectacle. "A hanging was a carnival that diverted not merely the unemployed but the unemployable. Good bourgeois or curious aristocrats who could afford it watched it from a carriage or rented a room." Public punishment as entertainment lasted until the 19th century, by which time "the awesome event of a public hanging aroused the[ir] loathing of writers and philosophers". Both Dickens and Thackeray wrote about a hanging in Newgate Prison in 1840, and "taught an even wider public that executions are obscene entertainments".

== Children ==
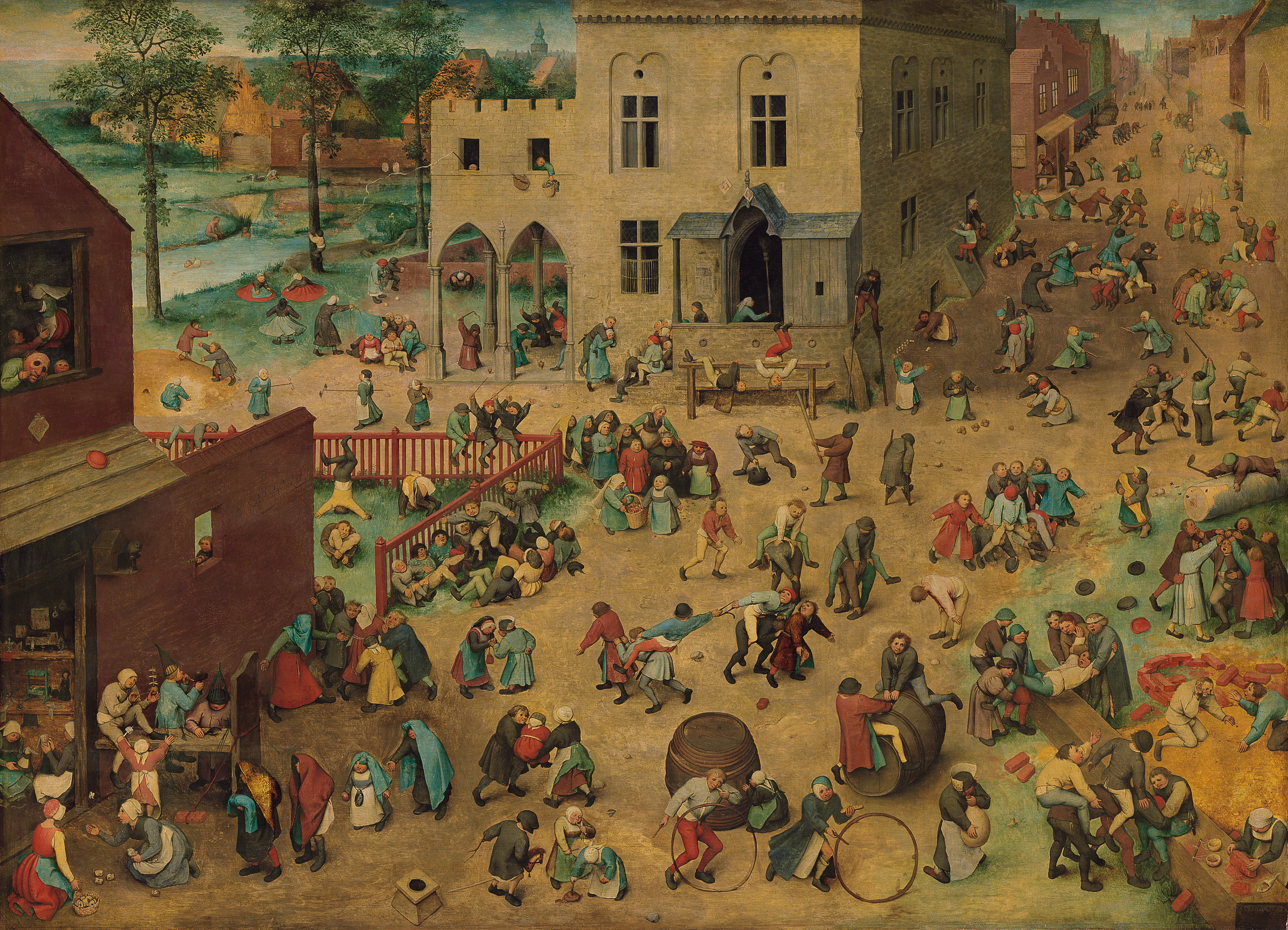
Pieter Bruegel Children's Games (1560)

Children's entertainment is centred on play and is significant for their growth. It often mimics adult activities, such as watching performances (on television); prepares them for adult responsibilities, such as child-rearing or social interaction (through dolls, pets and group games); or develops skills such as motor skills (such as a game of marbles), needed for sports and music. In the modern day, it often involves sedentary engagement with television or tablet computers.

Entertainment is also provided to children or taught to them by adults. A children's entertainer or performer is a professional whose job it is to entertain children. The term can be used to describe a children's musician or television presenter, but encompasses a wide range of specialisations, including magicians, costumed performers, puppeteers and party princesses. Many activities that appeal to children, such as puppets, clowns, pantomimes and cartoons, are also enjoyed by adults.

Children have always played games. It is accepted that, as well as being entertaining, playing games helps children's development. One of the most famous visual accounts of children's games is a painting by Pieter Bruegel the Elder called Children's Games, painted in 1560. It depicts children playing a range of games that presumably were typical of the time. Many of these games, such as marbles, hide-and-seek, blowing soap bubbles and piggyback-riding, continue to be played.

Example of a rating system specifying age appropriateness (Israel)

Most forms of entertainment can be or are modified to suit children's needs and interests. During the 20th century, starting with the often criticised but nonetheless important work of G. Stanley Hall, who "promoted the link between the study of development and the 'new' laboratory psychology", and especially with the work of Jean Piaget, who "saw cognitive development as being analogous to biological development", it became understood that the psychological development of children occurs in stages and that their capacities differ from adults. Hence, stories and activities – whether in books, film, or video games – were developed specifically for child audiences. Countries have responded to the special needs of children and the rise of digital entertainment by developing systems such as television content rating systems to guide the public and the entertainment industry.

In the 21st century, as with adult products, much entertainment is available for children on the internet for private use. This constitutes a significant change from earlier times. The amount of time expended by children indoors on screen-based entertainment, along with the "remarkable collapse of children's engagement with nature", has drawn criticism for its negative effects on imagination, adult cognition and psychological well-being.

Types of children's entertainment

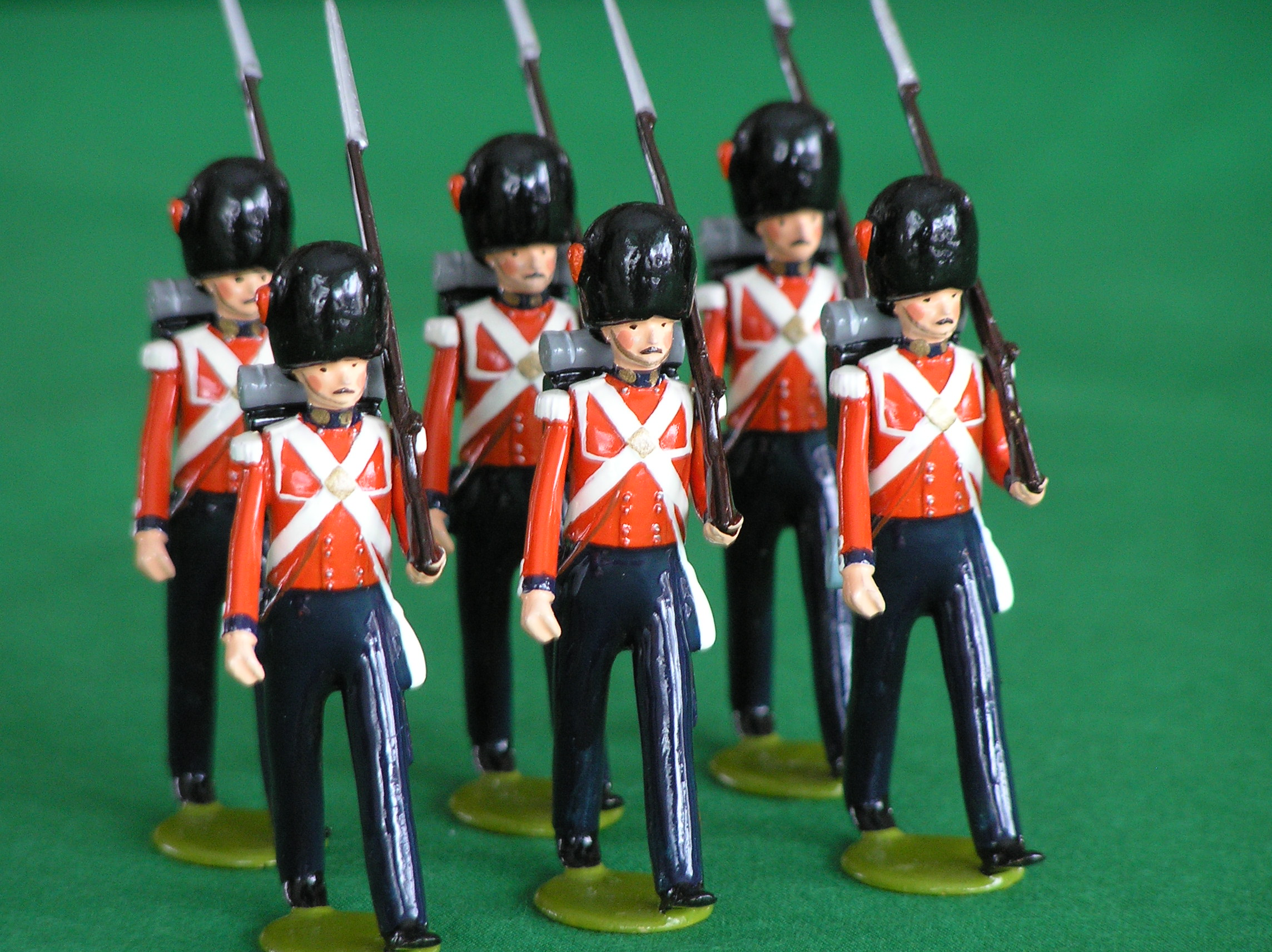
Toy Coldstream Guards soldiers (19th century)

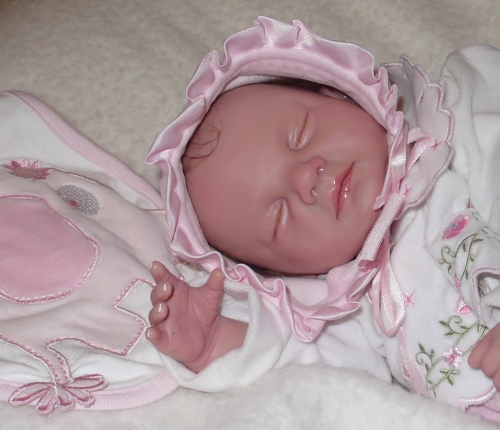
Doll of a newborn baby

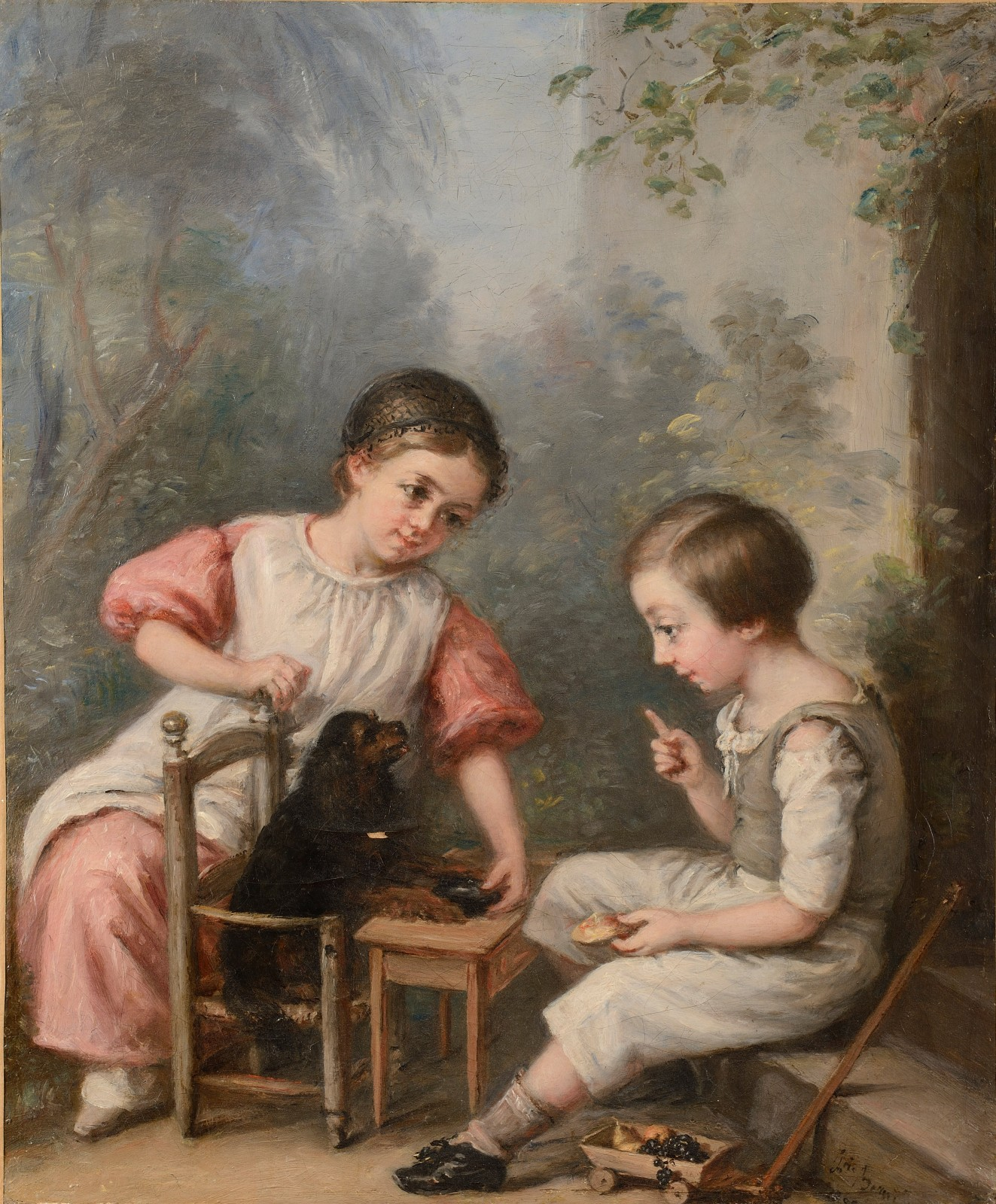
Children being entertained by a dog (19th century painting)

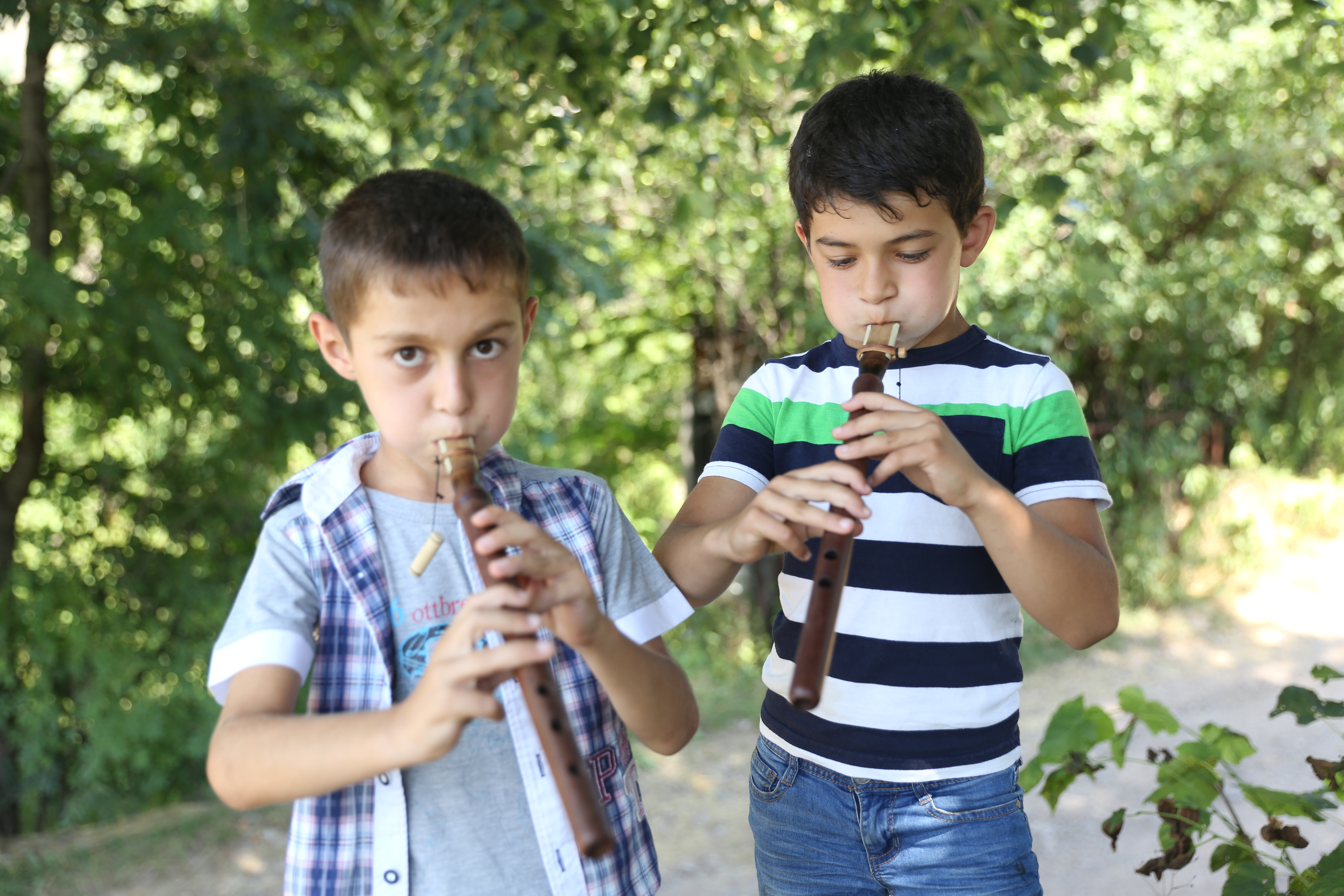
Boys playing recorders

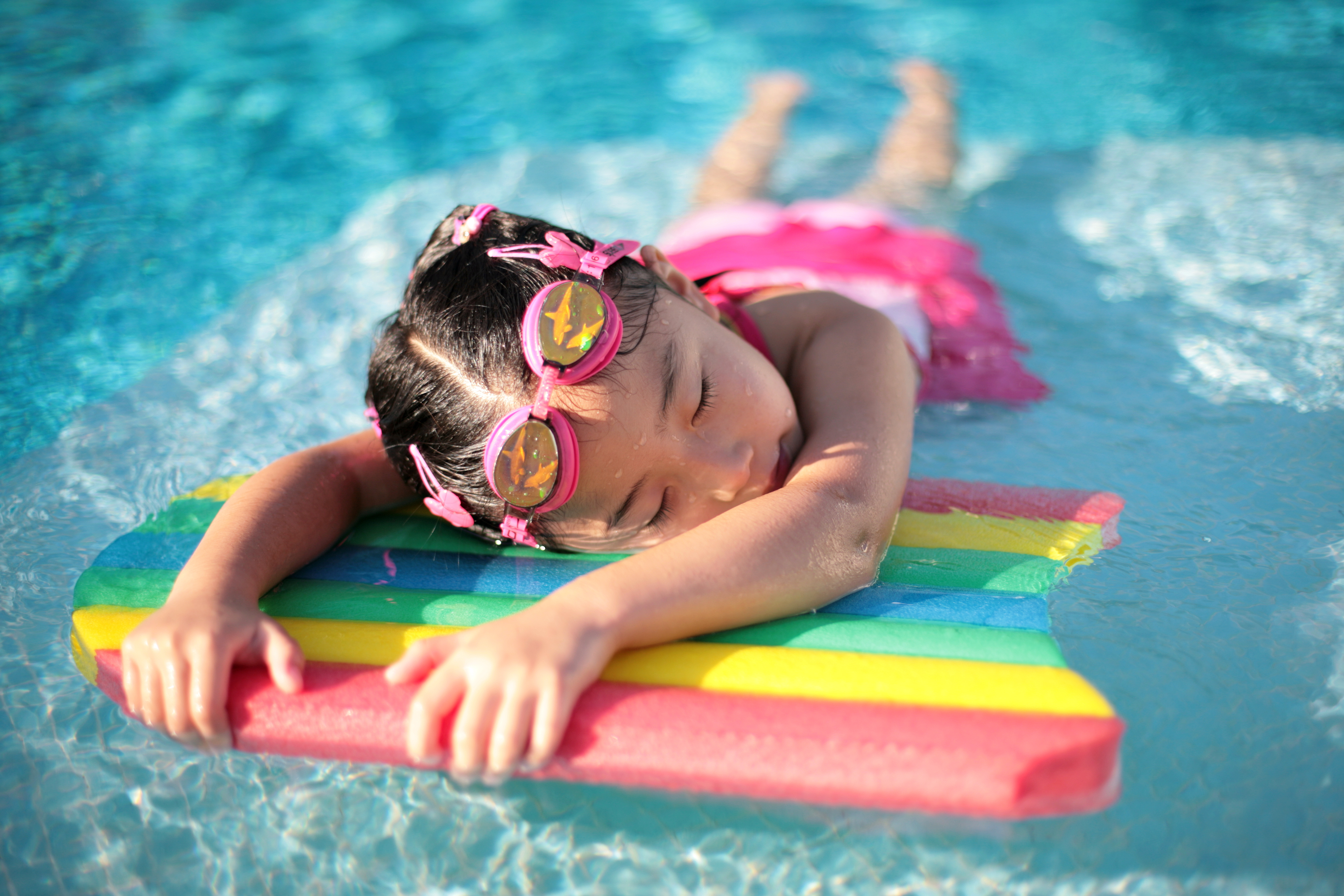
Girl in a swimming pool

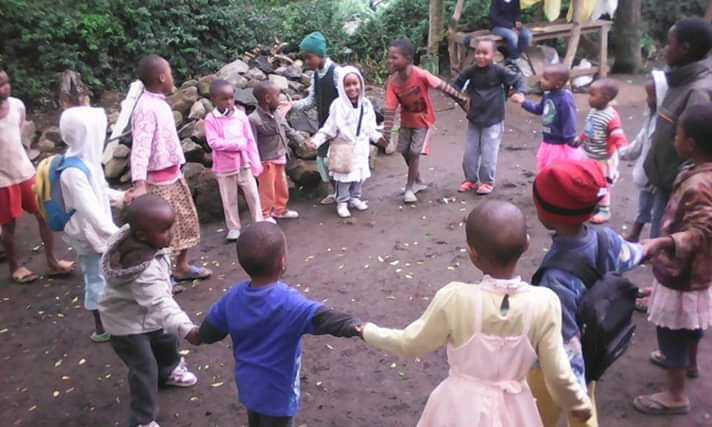
Children in a group game

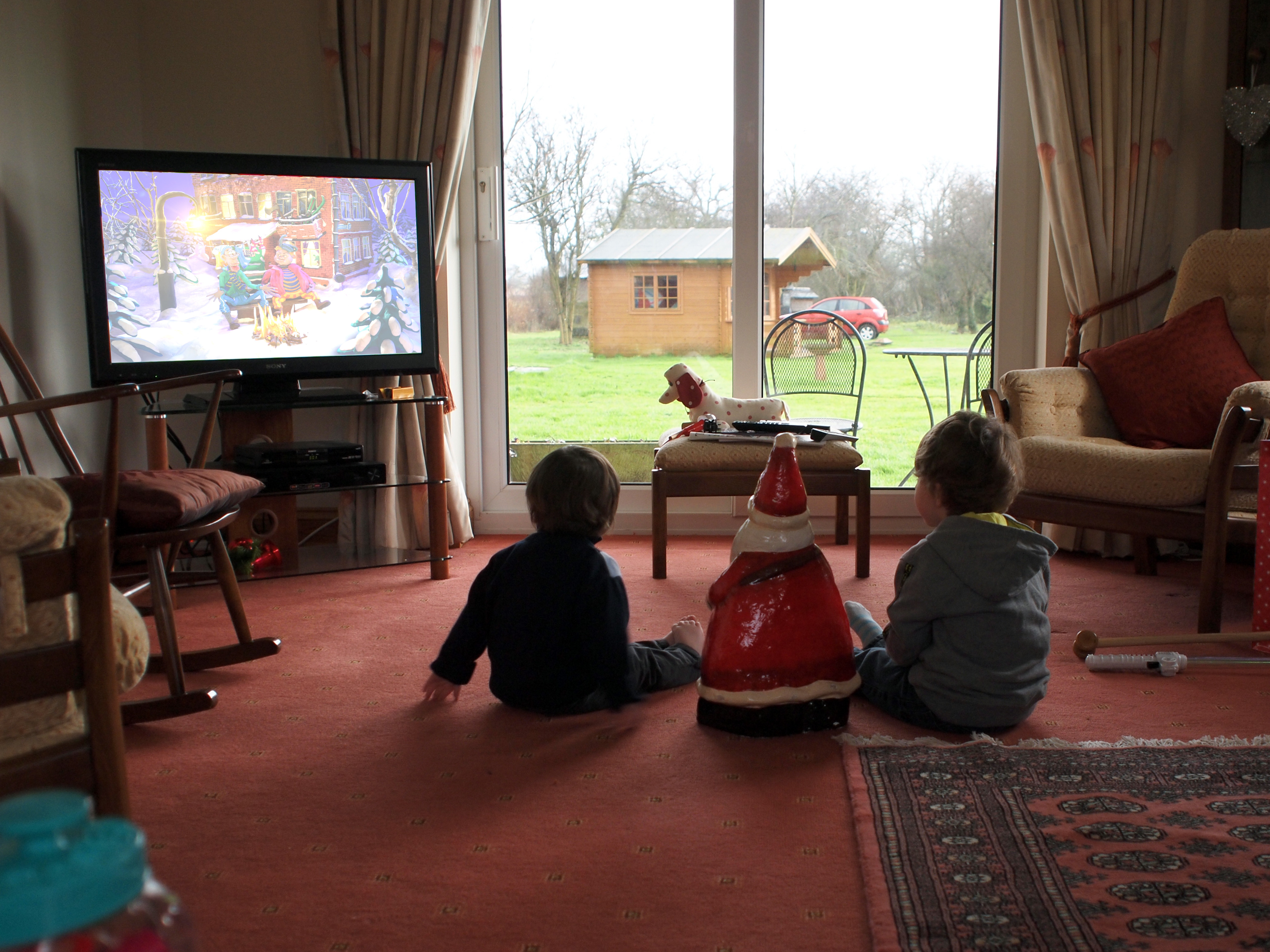
Boys watching children's TV

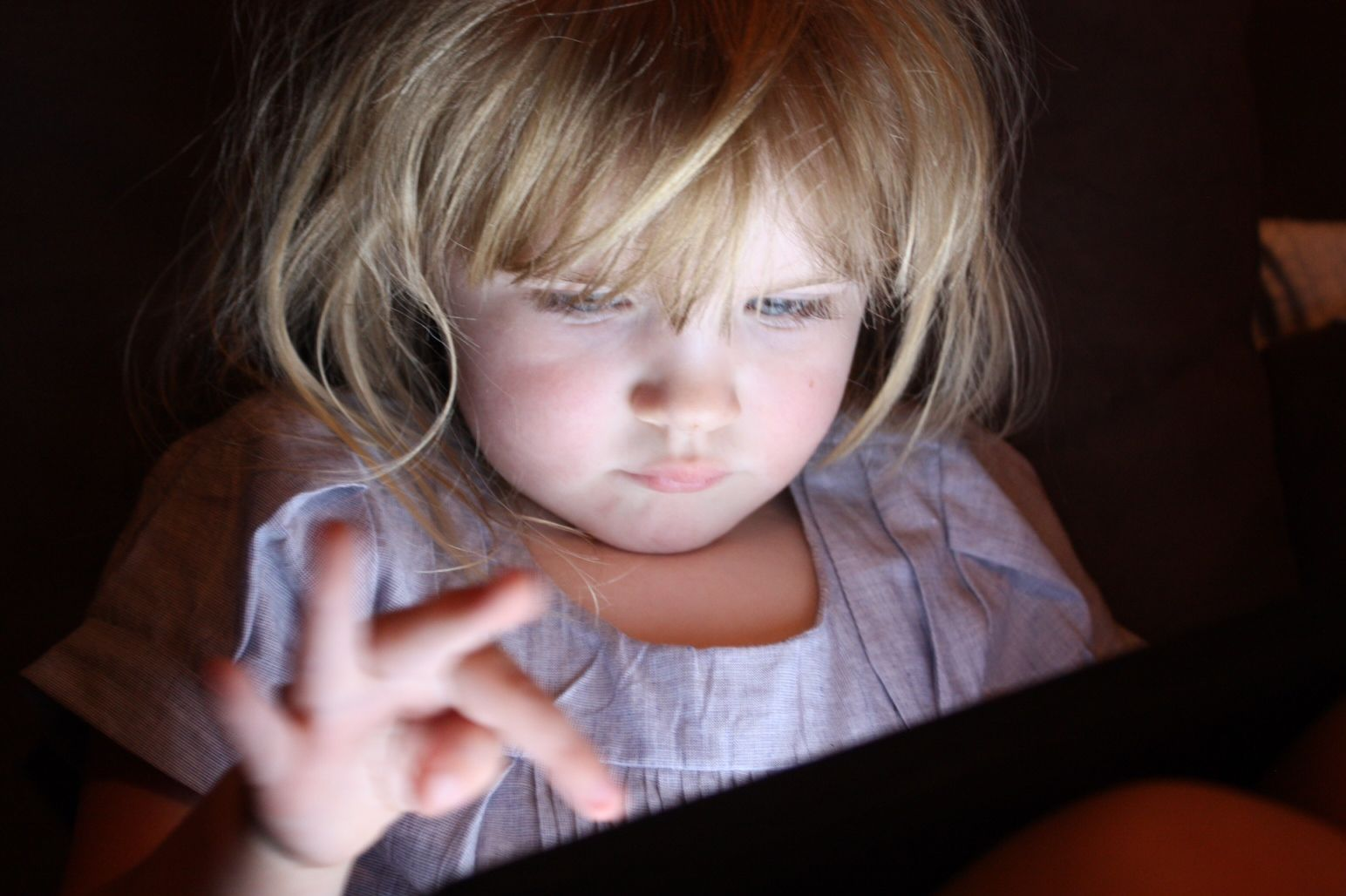
Toddler using a tablet computer

== Forms ==
=== Banquets ===
Banquets have been a venue for amusement, entertainment or pleasure since ancient times, continuing through the modern era and into the 21st century, when they are still being used for many of their original purposes – to impress visitors, especially important ones; to show hospitality; and as an occasion to showcase supporting entertainments such as music or dancing, or both. They were an integral part of court entertainments and helped entertainers develop their skills. They are also important components of celebrations such as coronations, weddings, birthdays, civic or political achievements, military engagements or victories, as well as religious obligations – one of the most famous being the Banqueting House, Whitehall in London. In modern times, banquets are available privately, or commercially in restaurants, sometimes combined with a dramatic performance in dinner theatres. Cooking by professional chefs has also become a form of entertainment as part of global competitions such as the Bocuse d'Or.

Banquets across centuries and cultures

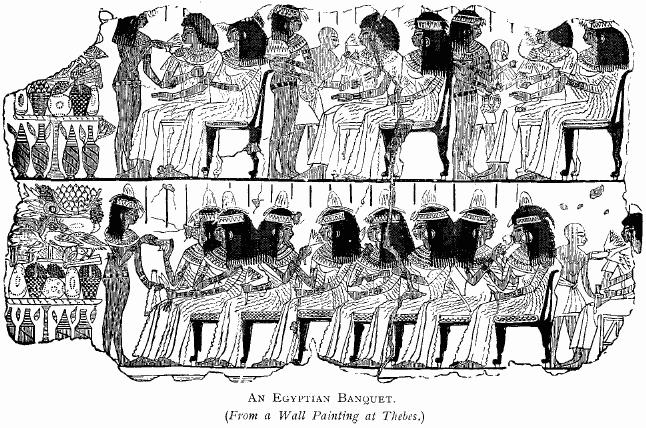
A banquet scene from Ancient Egypt (from a wall painting in Thebes)

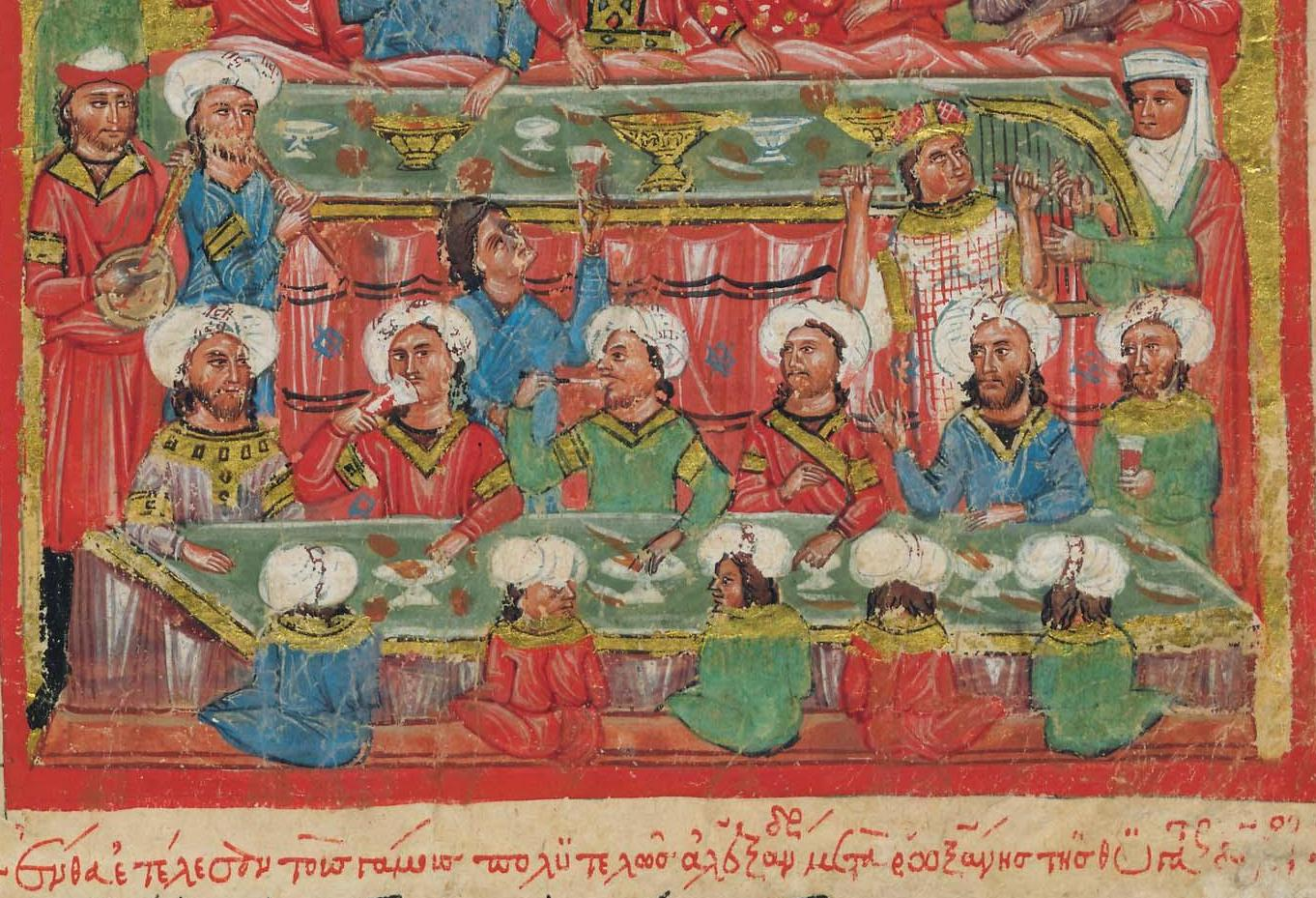
Byzantine banquet showing musicians and various musical instruments (Venice Alexander Romance, late 14th century)

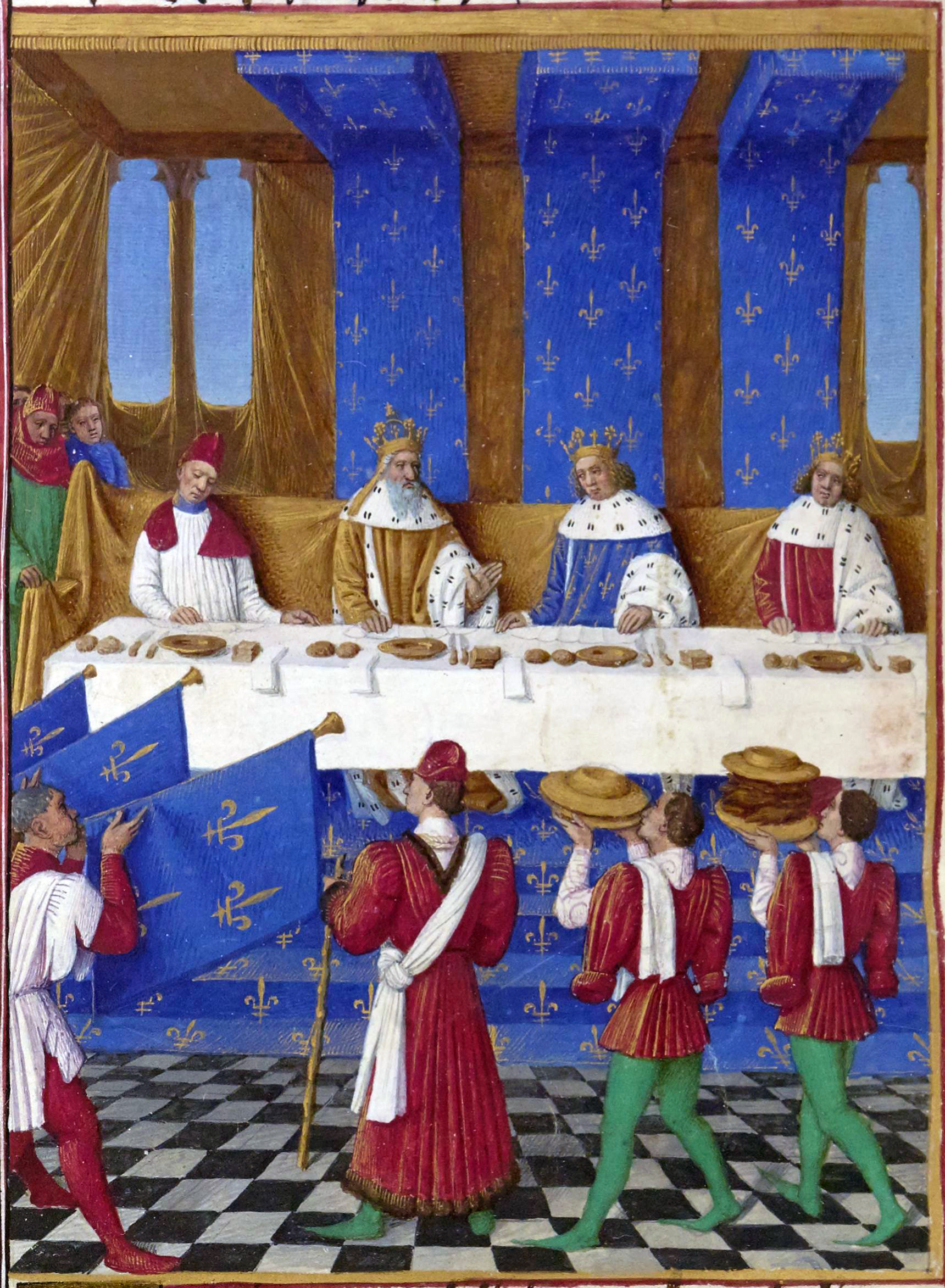
Jean Fouquet, Banquet for Charles V of France (1455–1460)

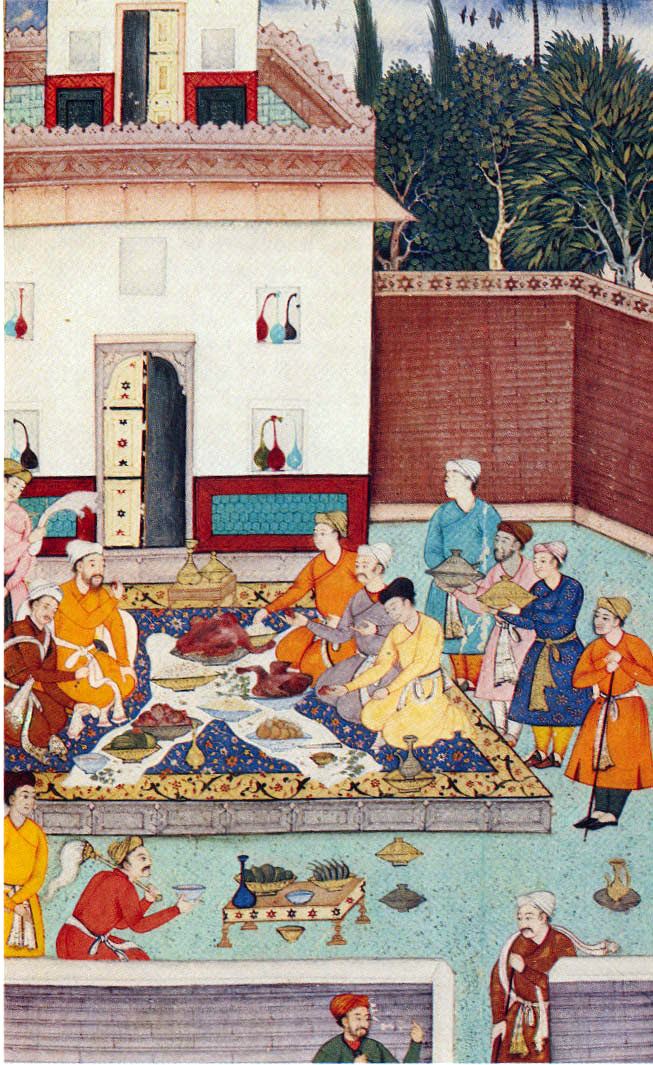
A banquet including roast goose given for Babur by the Mirzas in 1507 (miniature c. 1590)

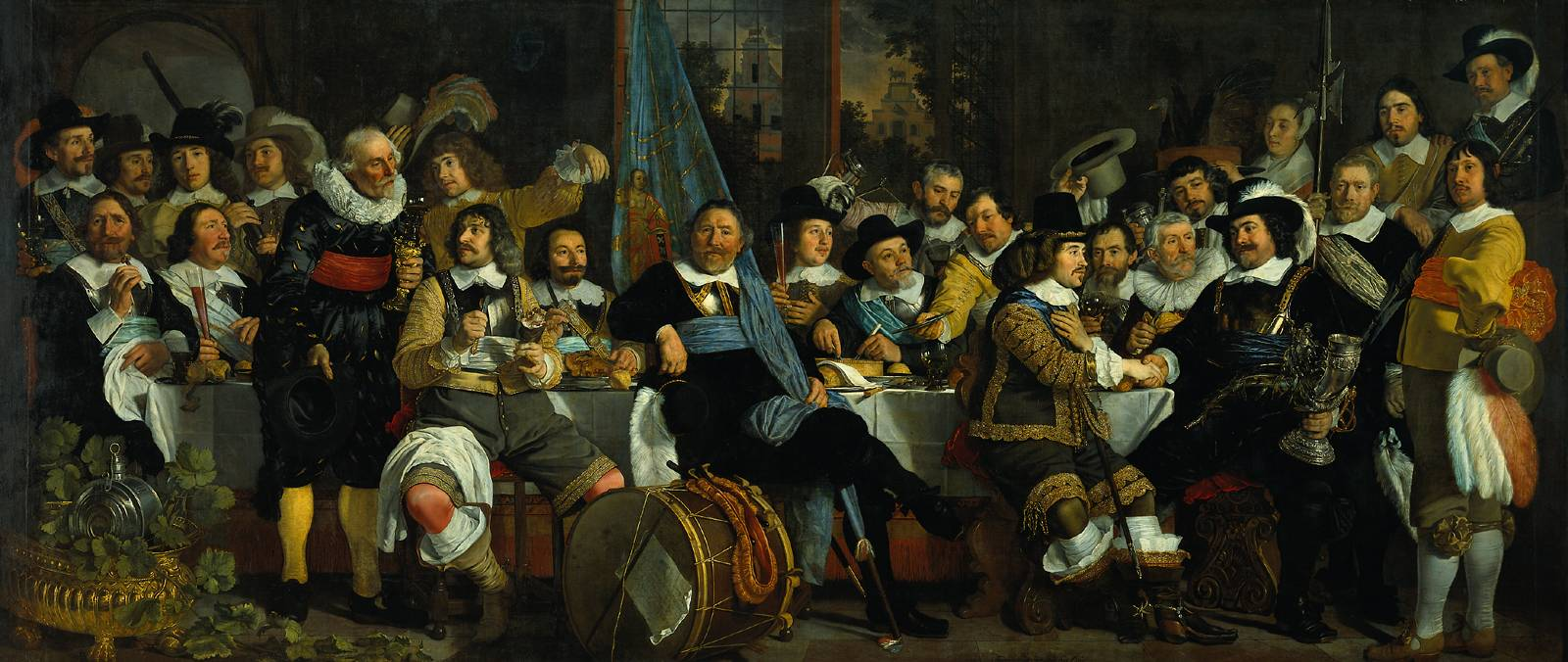
Bartholomeus van der Helst, Peace of Münster
Amsterdam (1648)

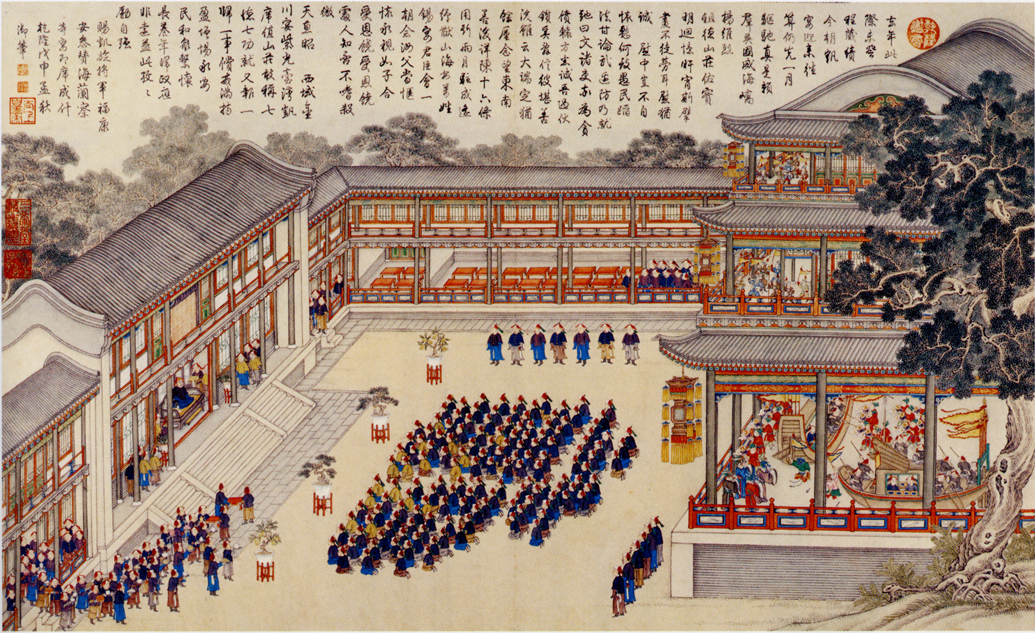
Victory banquet by Emperor Qianlong to greet the officers who attended the campaign against Taiwan (late 18th century)

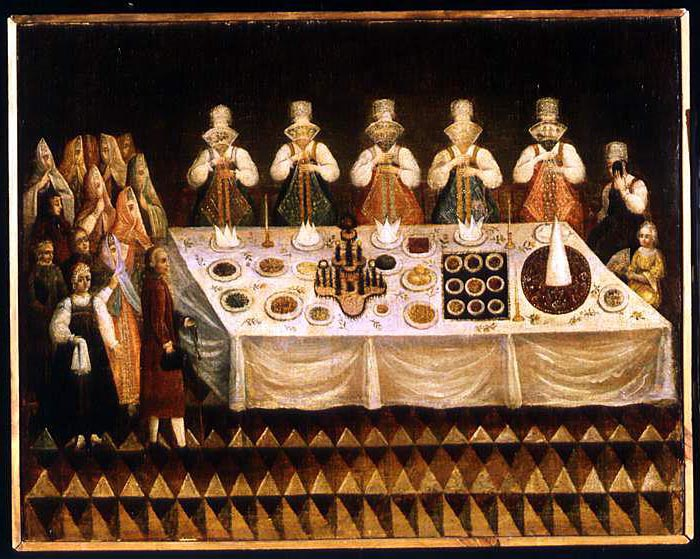
Landlords coming to the peasants' wedding banquet (late 18th century)

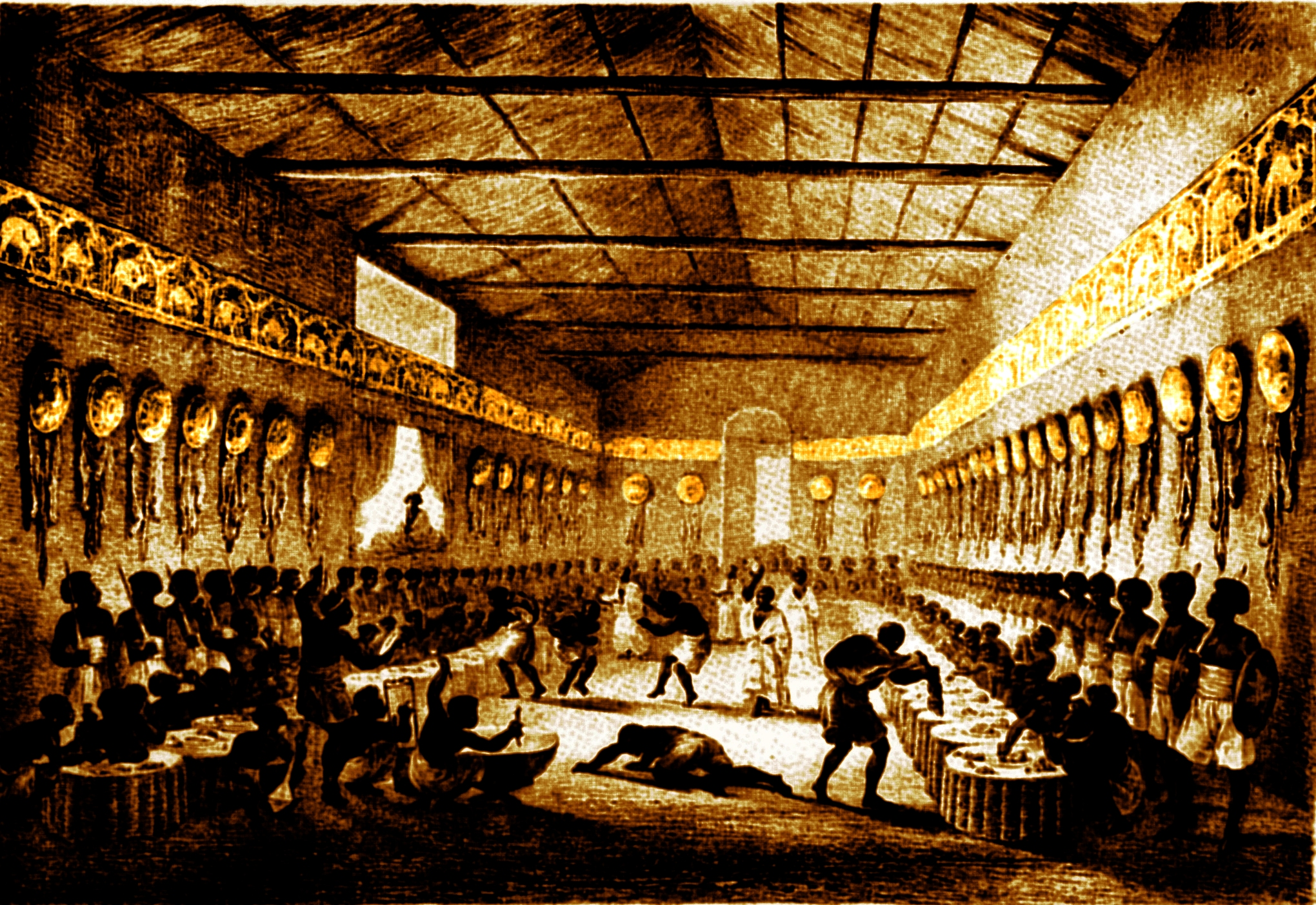
The banquet hall in the palace of King Sahle Selassie painting from a photo, Ethiopia (1852)

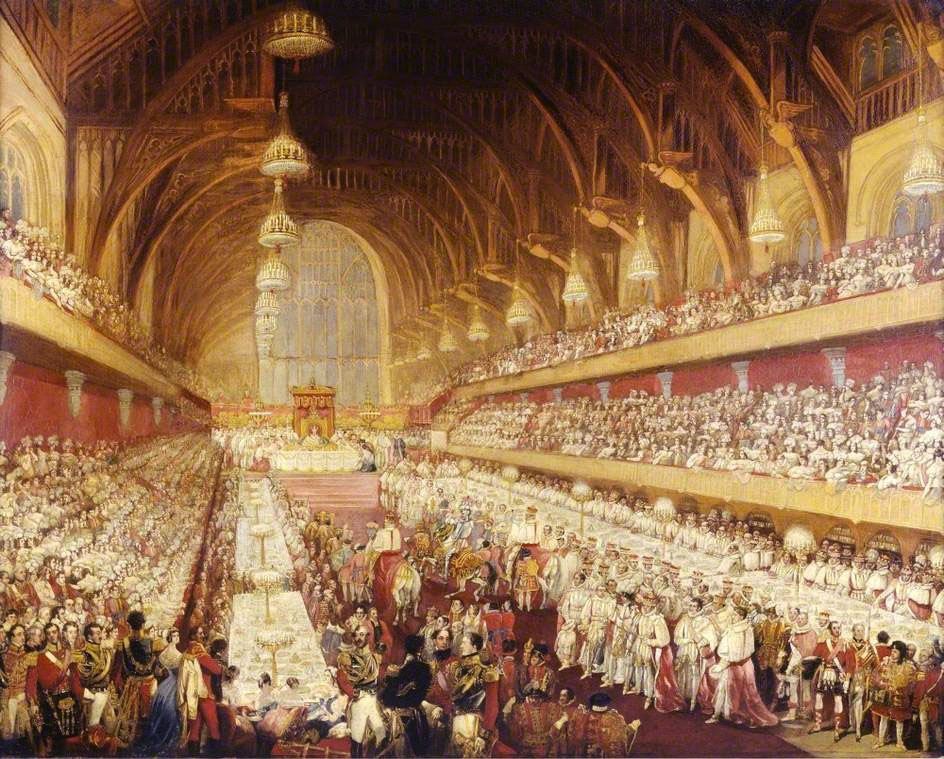
Coronation banquet of George IV in Westminster Hall (1821)

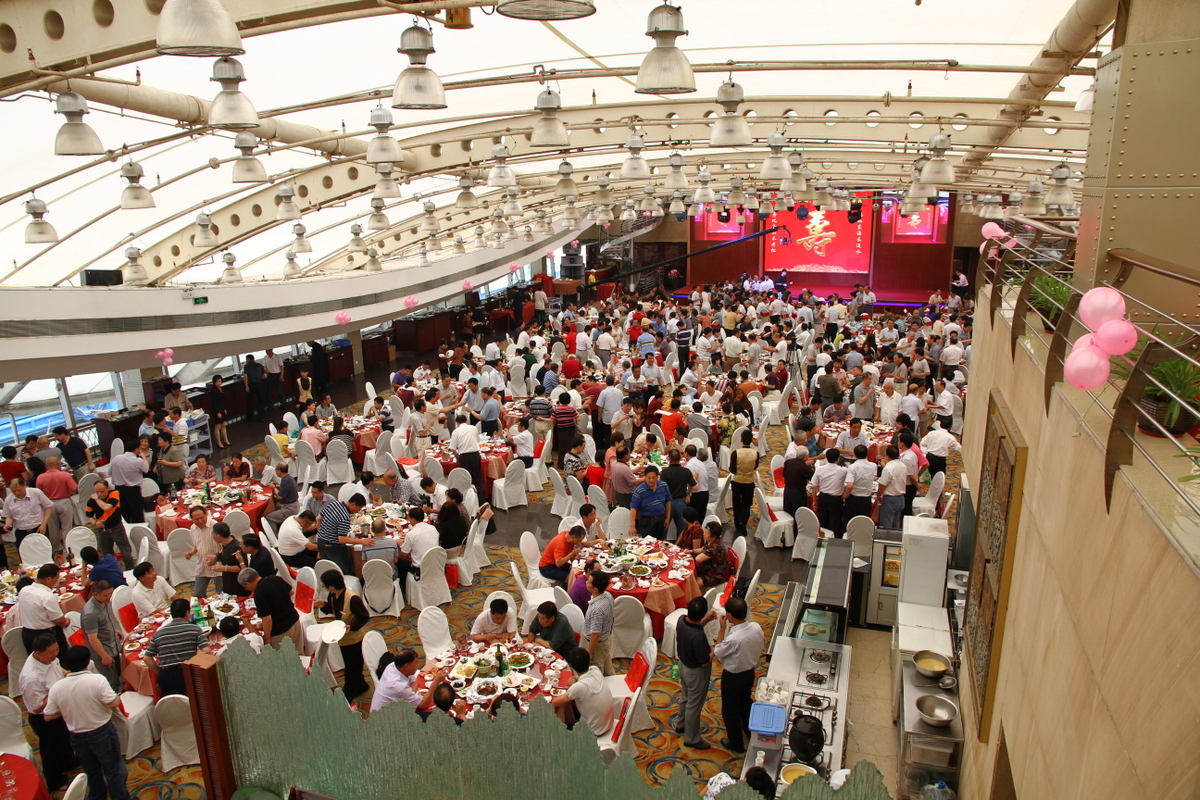
Chinese banquet in a banquet hall given as a birthday celebration (2012)

=== Music ===
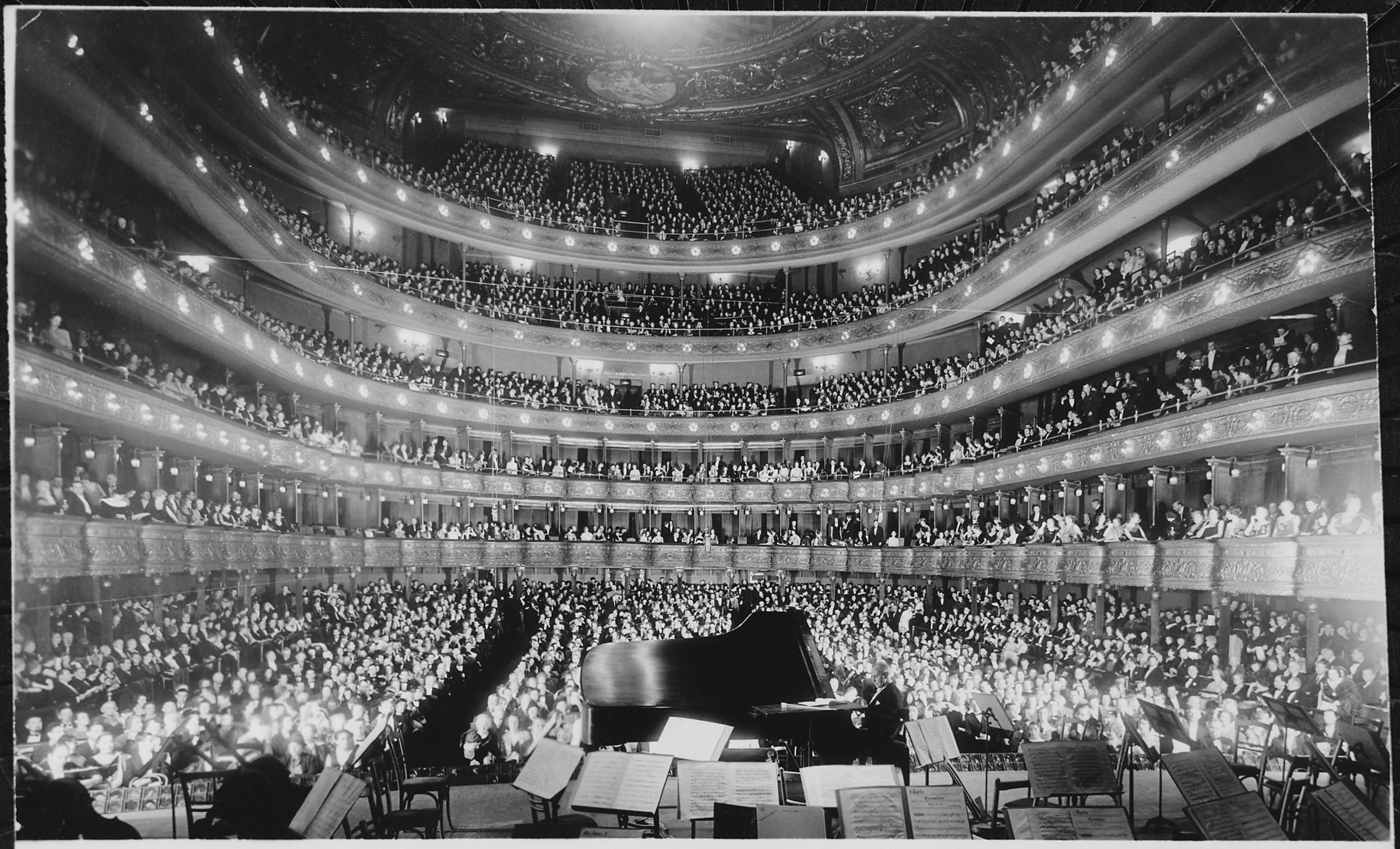
A full house at the Metropolitan Opera in New York City, waiting for a musical entertainment to begin (1937)

Music is a supporting component of many kinds of entertainment and most kinds of performance. For example, it is used to enhance storytelling, it is indispensable in dance and opera, and is usually incorporated into dramatic film or theatre productions.

Music is also a universal and popular type of entertainment on its own, constituting an entire performance, such as when concerts are given. Depending on the rhythm, instrument, performance and style, music is divided into many genres, such as classical, jazz, folk, rock, pop music or traditional. Since the 20th century, performed music, once available only to those who could pay for the performers, has been available cheaply to individuals by the entertainment industry, which broadcasts it or pre-records it for sale.

The wide variety of musical performances, whether or not they are artificially amplified, all provide entertainment irrespective of whether the performance is from soloists, choral or orchestral groups, or ensembles. Live performances use specialised venues, which might be small or large; indoors or outdoors; free or expensive. The audiences have different expectations of the performers as well as of their own role in the performance. For example, some audiences expect to listen silently and are entertained by the excellence of the music, its rendition or its interpretation. Other audiences of live performances are entertained by the ambience and the chance to participate. Even more listeners are entertained by pre-recorded music and listen privately.

The instruments used in musical entertainment are either solely the human voice or solely instrumental or some combination of the two. Whether the performance is given by vocalists or instrumentalists, the performers may be soloists or part of a small or large group, in turn entertaining an audience that might be individual, passing by, small or large. Singing is generally accompanied by instruments although some forms, notably a cappella and overtone singing, are unaccompanied. Modern concerts often use various special effects and other theatrics to accompany performances of singing and dancing.

Types of audience engagement with musical entertainment

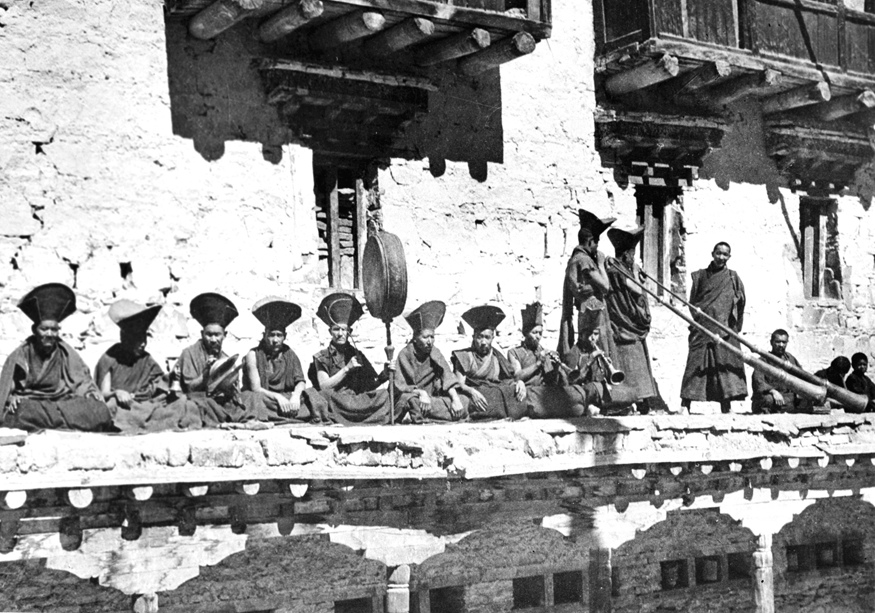
Traditional instruments used to accompany dance (Tibet, 1949)

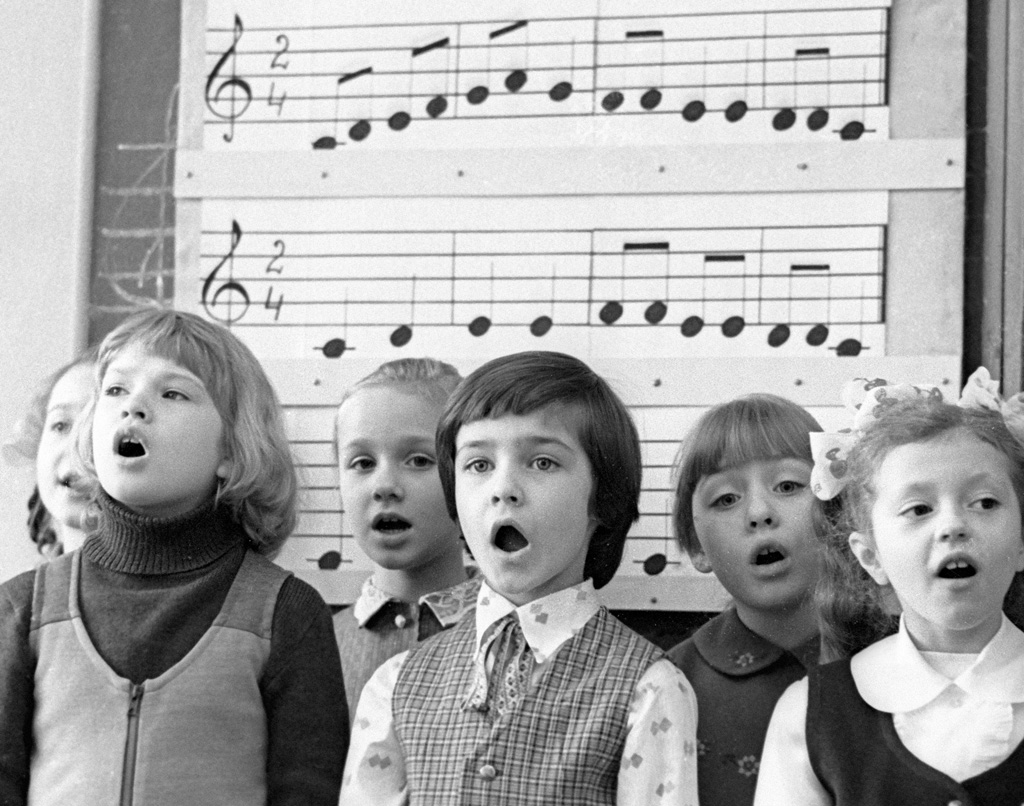
Children's choir providing musical entertainment (Soviet Union, 1979)

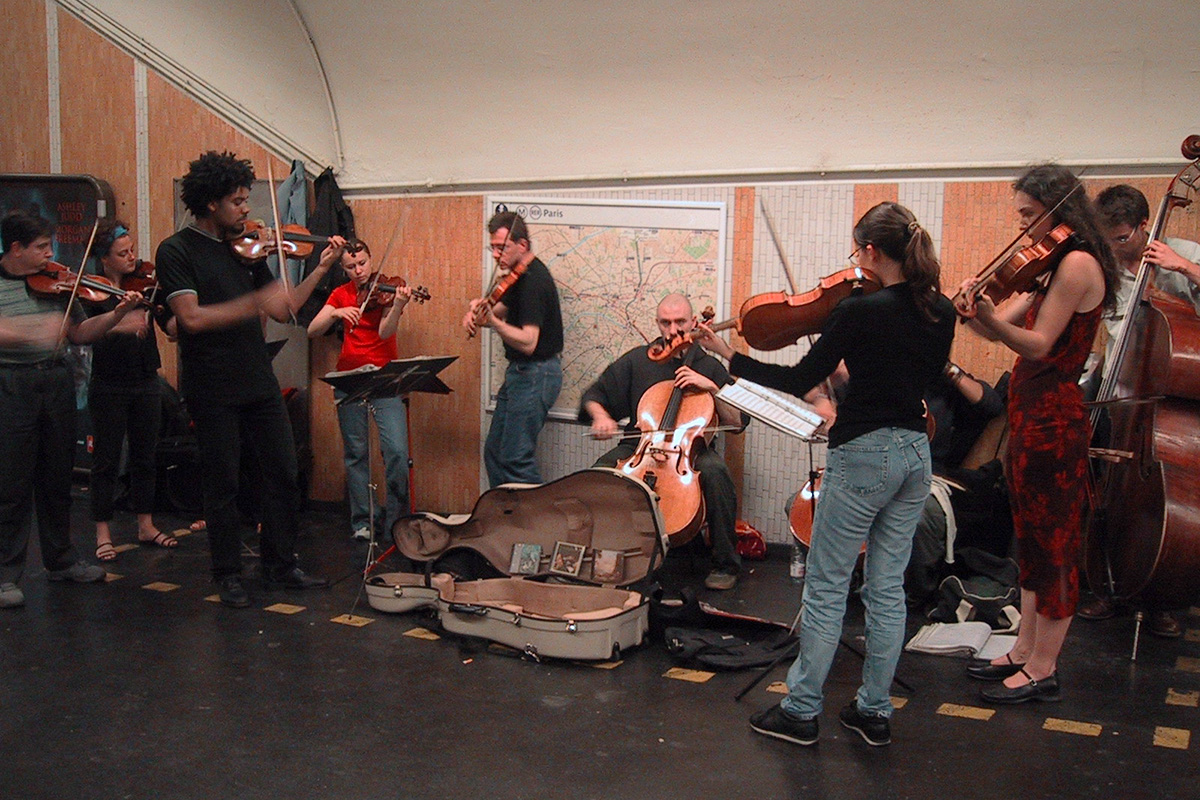
Ensemble entertains travellers in the Paris Metro (2002)

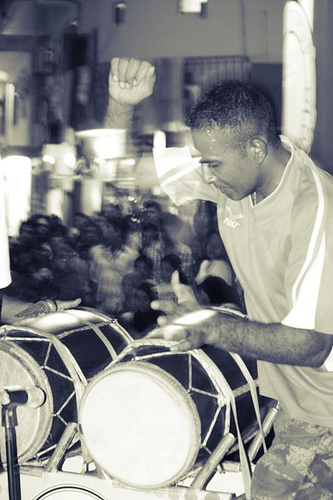
Drummer playing Boduberu (Maldives, 2010)

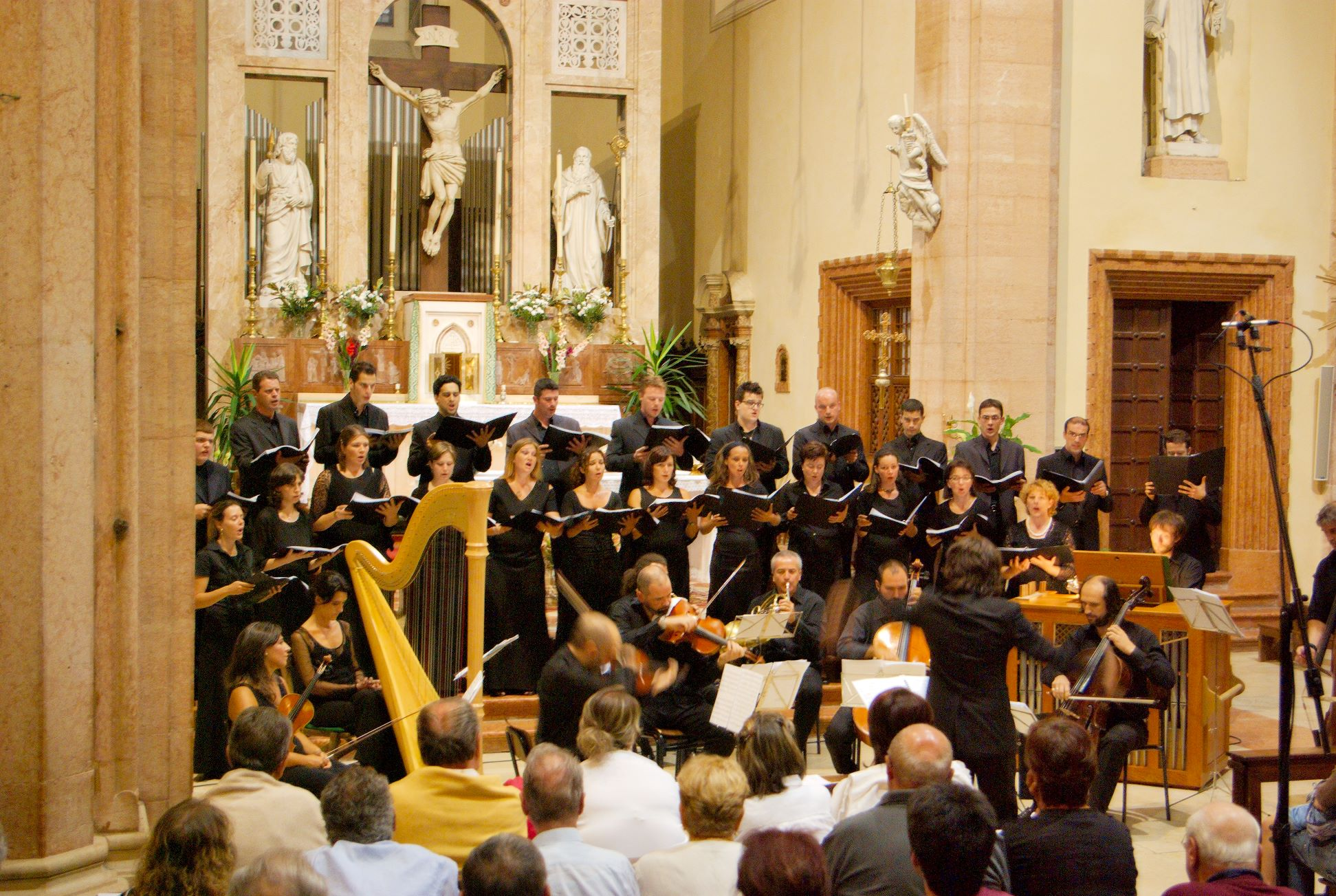
Choir and orchestra in ecclesiastical setting (Italy, 2008)

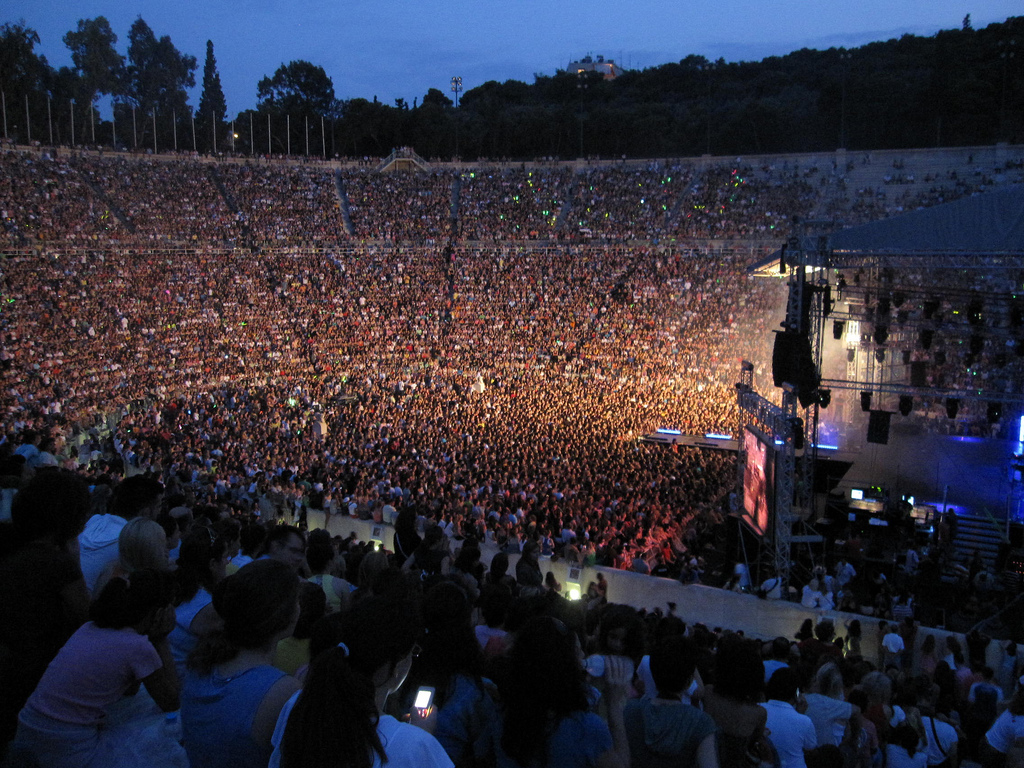
Contemporary audience in ancient outdoor stadium (Greece, 2009)

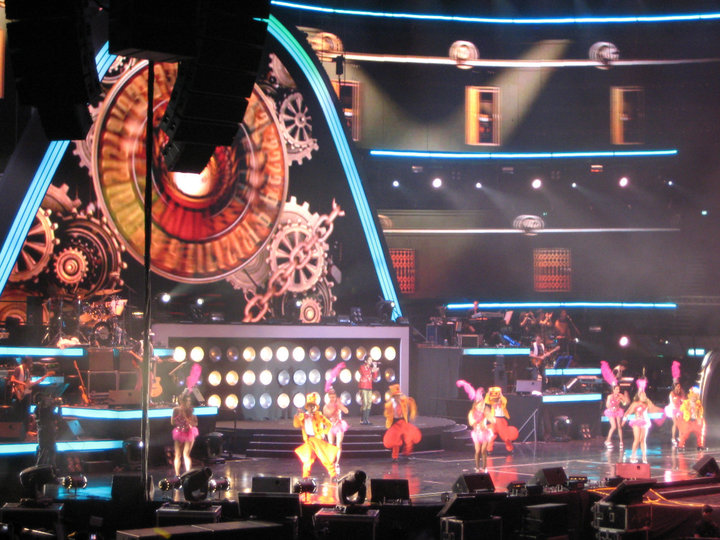
A concert with a 3D enhanced stage (Singapore, 2010)

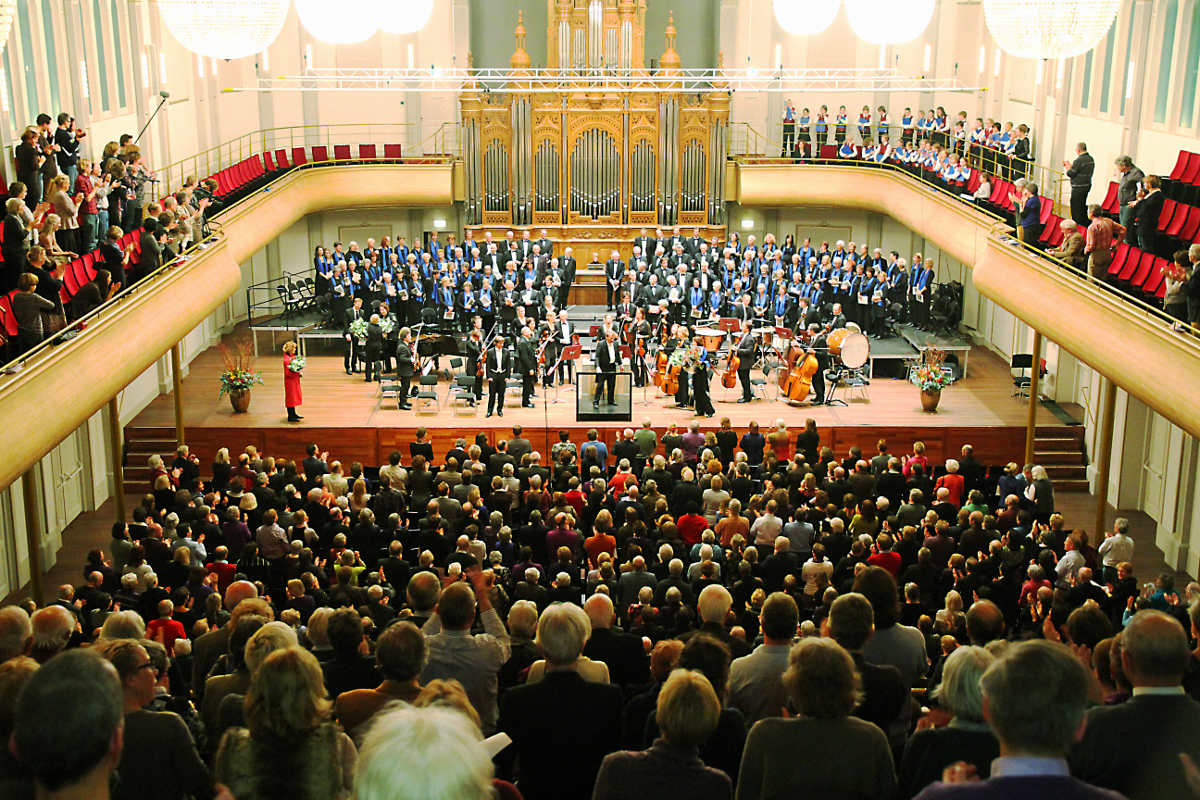
Concert hall audience (Netherlands, 2010)

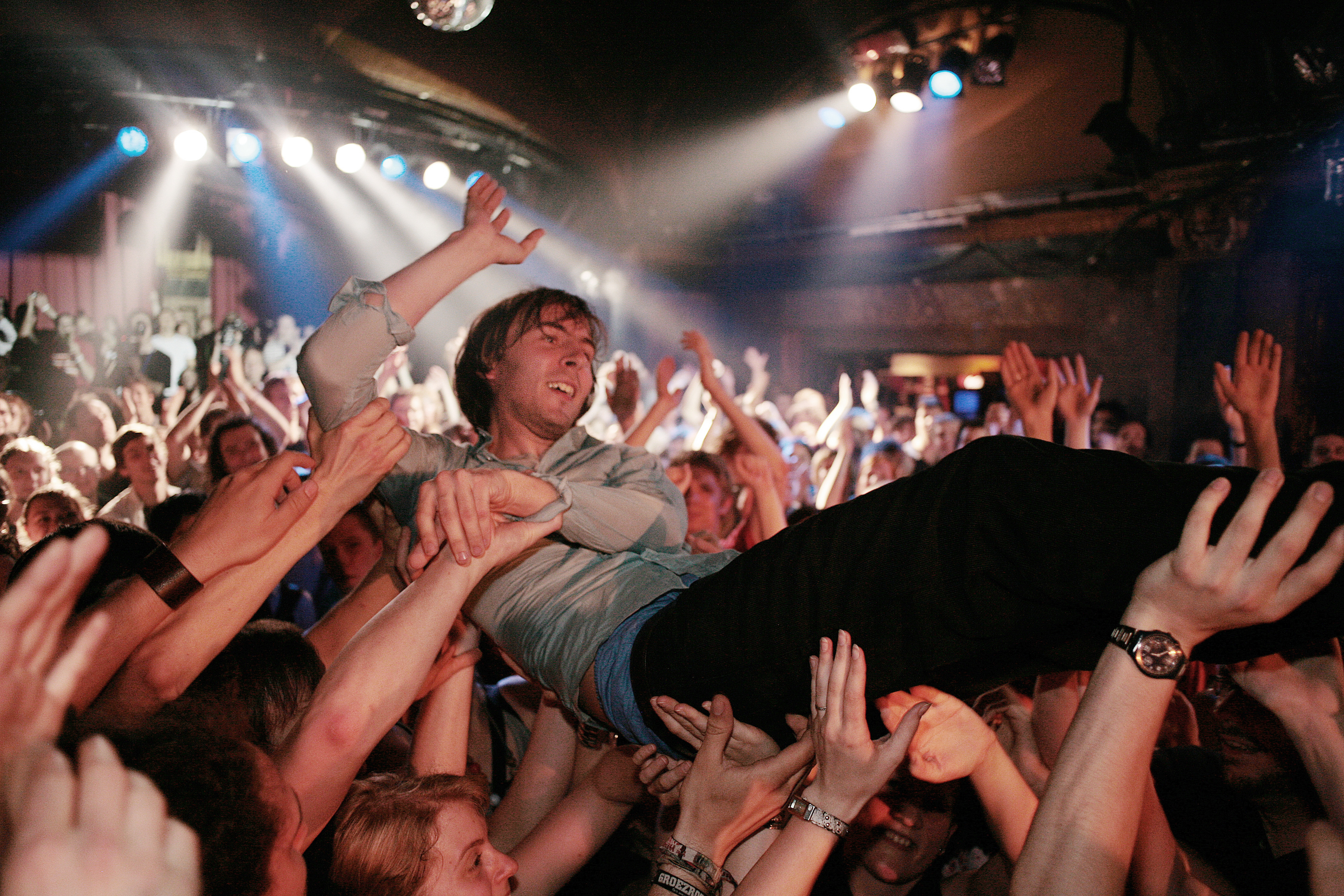
Crowd surfing at a concert (France, 2011)

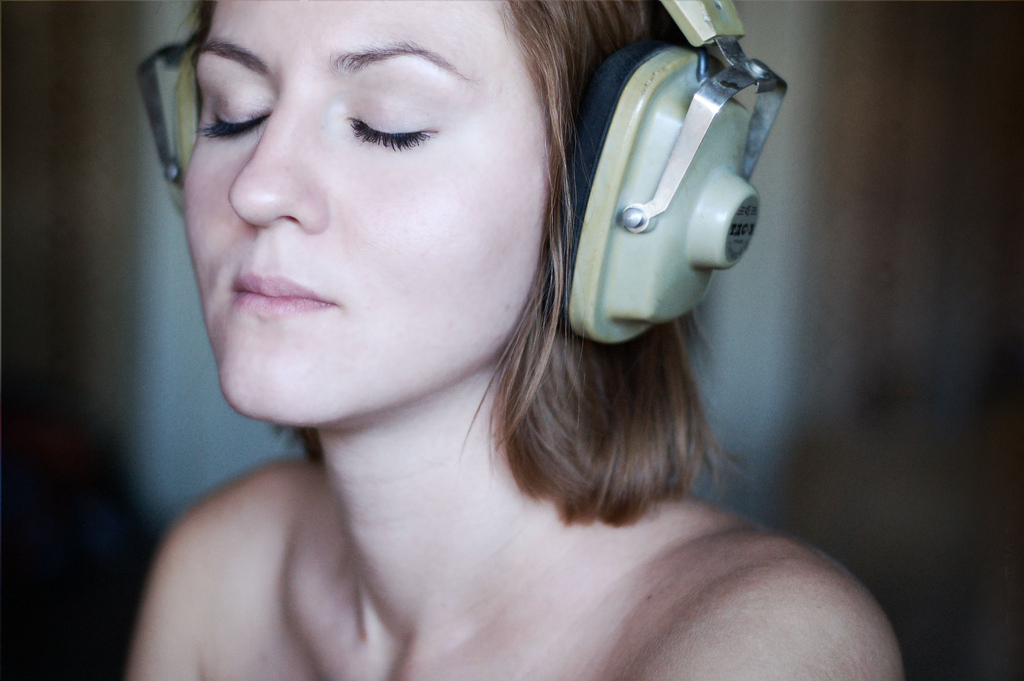
Woman listening privately to music through headphones (Russia, 2010)

=== Games ===
Games are played for entertainment – sometimes purely for recreation, sometimes for achievement or reward as well. They can be played alone, in teams, or online; by amateurs or by professionals. The players may have an audience of non-players, such as when people are entertained by watching a chess championship. On the other hand, players in a game may constitute their own audience as they take their turn to play. Often, part of the entertainment for children playing a game is deciding who is part of their audience and who is a player.

Equipment varies with the game. Board games, such as Go, Monopoly or backgammon, need a board and markers. One of the oldest known board games is Senet, a game played in Ancient Egypt, enjoyed by the pharaoh Tutankhamun. Card games, such as whist, poker and bridge, have long been played as evening entertainment among friends. For these games, all that is needed is a deck of playing cards. Other games, such as bingo, played with numerous strangers, have been organised to involve the participation of non-players via gambling. Many are geared for children and can be played outdoors, including hopscotch, hide and seek, and Blind man's bluff. The list of ball games is quite extensive. It includes, for example, croquet, lawn bowling and paintball, as well as many sports using various forms of balls. The options cater to a wide range of skill and fitness levels. Physical games can develop agility and competence in motor skills. Number games such as Sudoku and puzzle games like the Rubik's Cube can develop mental prowess.

Video games are played using a controller to create results on a screen. They can also be played online with participants joining in remotely. In the second half of the 20th century and in the 21st century, the number of such games increased enormously, providing a wide variety of entertainment to players around the world. Video games are popular across the world.

Games

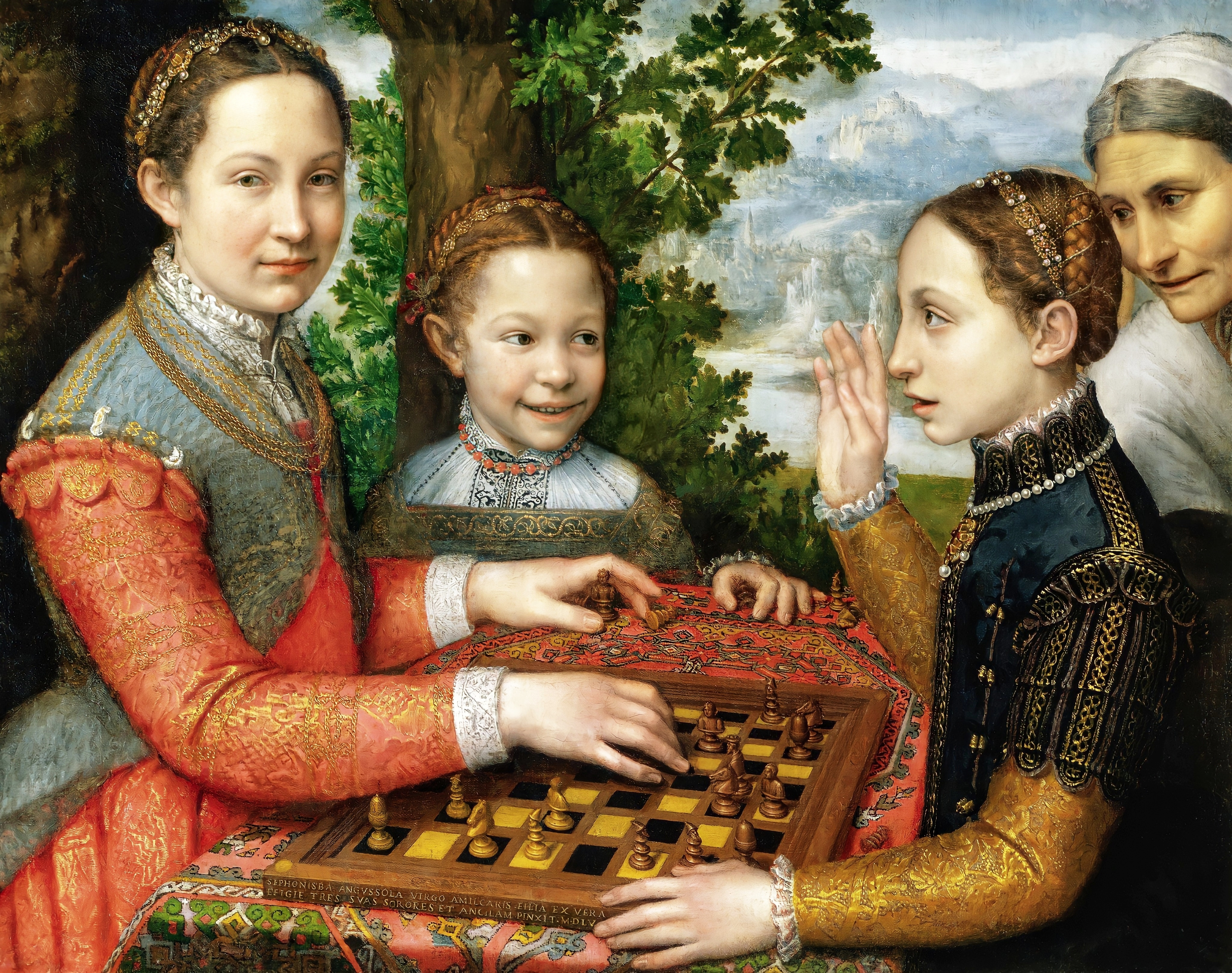
Sofonisba Anguissola
The Chess Game (1555)
An intellectual game

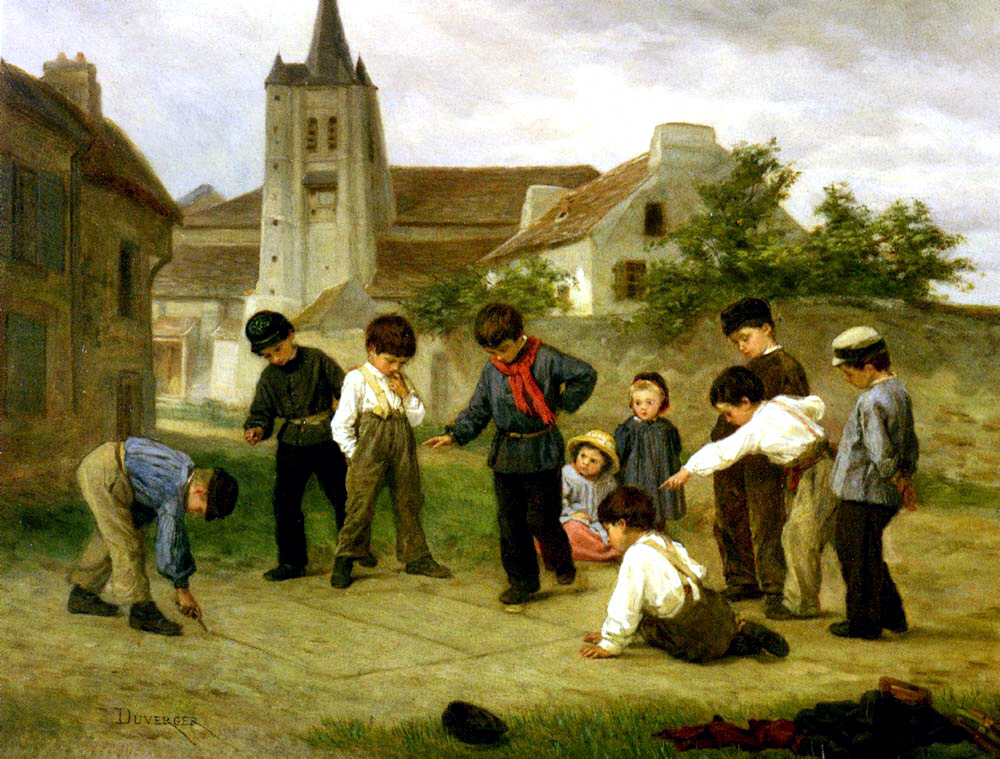
Théophile Emmanuel Duverger (before 1901) Hopscotch
A physical game

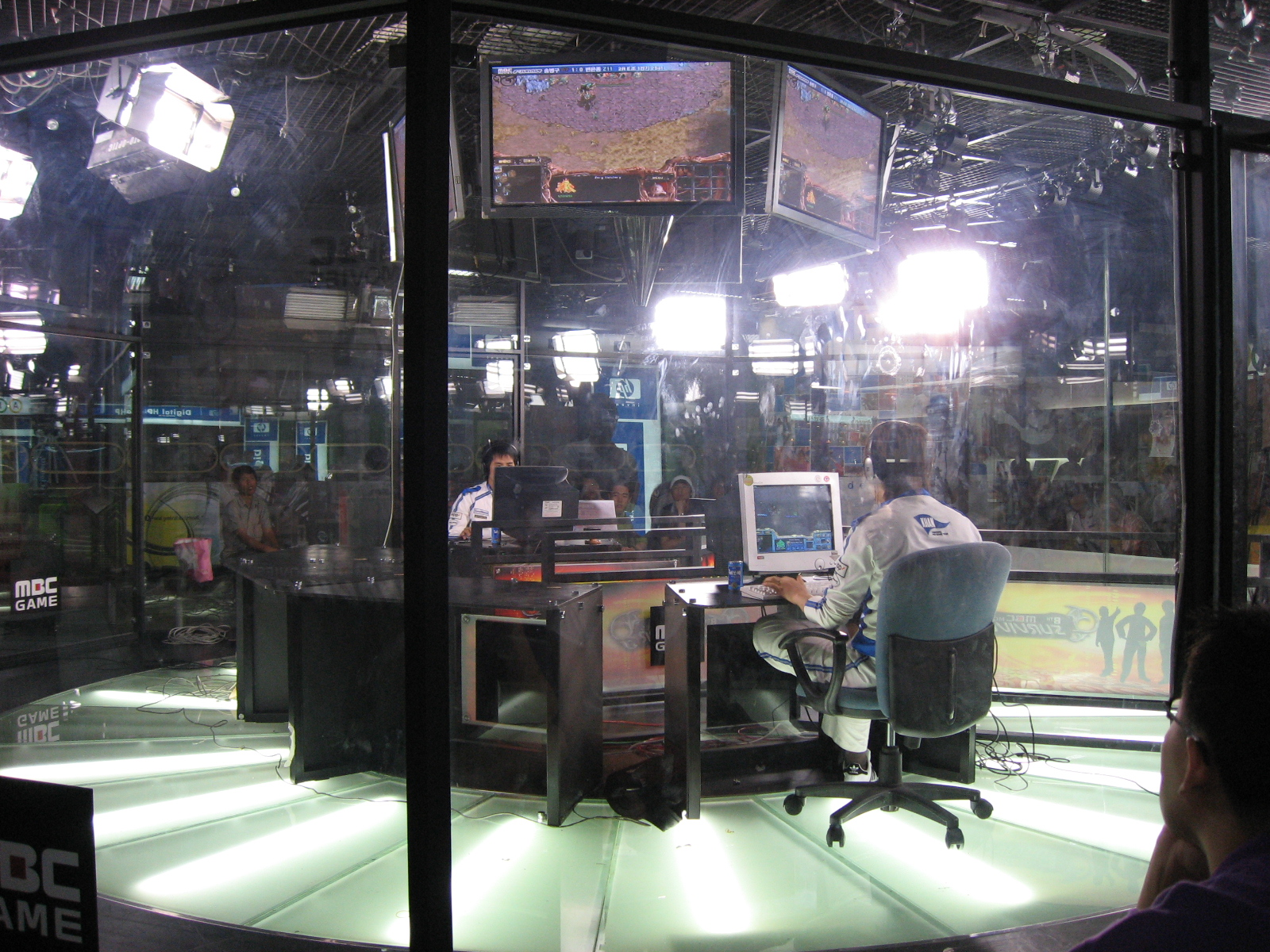
Televised match of StarCraft (2006) South Korea
An electronic game

=== Literature ===
French poet Louise Labé (1520/1522–1566) wrote "a profound and timeless insight into reading's innate power":

The past gives us pleasure and is of more service than the present; but the delight of what we once felt is dimly lost never to return and its memory is as distressing as the events themselves were then delectable ... But when we happen to put our thoughts in writing, how easily, later on, does our mind race through an infinity of events, incessantly alive, so that a long time afterwards when we take up those written pages we can return to the same place and to the same disposition in which we once found ourselves.

– Quote from and commentary by Fischer (2003)

The young Saint Teresa of Ávila (1515–1582) read chivalrous novels and wrote about the "rapture" that books provided:

I became accustomed to reading [novels] and that small fault made me cool my desire and will to do other tasks. I thought nothing of spending many hours a day and night in this vain exercise, hidden from my father. My rapture in this was so great, that unless I had a new book to read, it seemed to me that I could not be happy.

– Quoted in Fischer (2003)

Reading has been a source of entertainment for a very long time, especially when other forms, such as performance entertainments, were (or are) either unavailable or too costly. Even when the primary purpose of the writing is to inform or instruct, reading is well known for its capacity to distract from everyday worries. Both stories and information have been passed on through the tradition of orality, and oral traditions survive in the form of performance poetry, for example. However, they have drastically declined. "Once literacy had arrived in strength, there was no return to the oral prerogative." The advent of printing, the reduction in costs of books and an increasing literacy all served to enhance the mass appeal of reading. Furthermore, as fonts were standardised and texts became clearer, "reading ceased being a painful process of decipherment and became an act of pure pleasure". By the 16th century in Europe, the appeal of reading for entertainment was well established. Novels, which are extended works of fiction, are sources of entertainment for readers, ranging from children to adults.

Among literature's many genres are some designed, in whole or in part, purely for entertainment. Limericks, for example, use verse in a strict, predictable rhyme and rhythm to create humour and to amuse an audience of listeners or readers. Interactive books such as "choose your own adventure" can make literary entertainment more participatory.

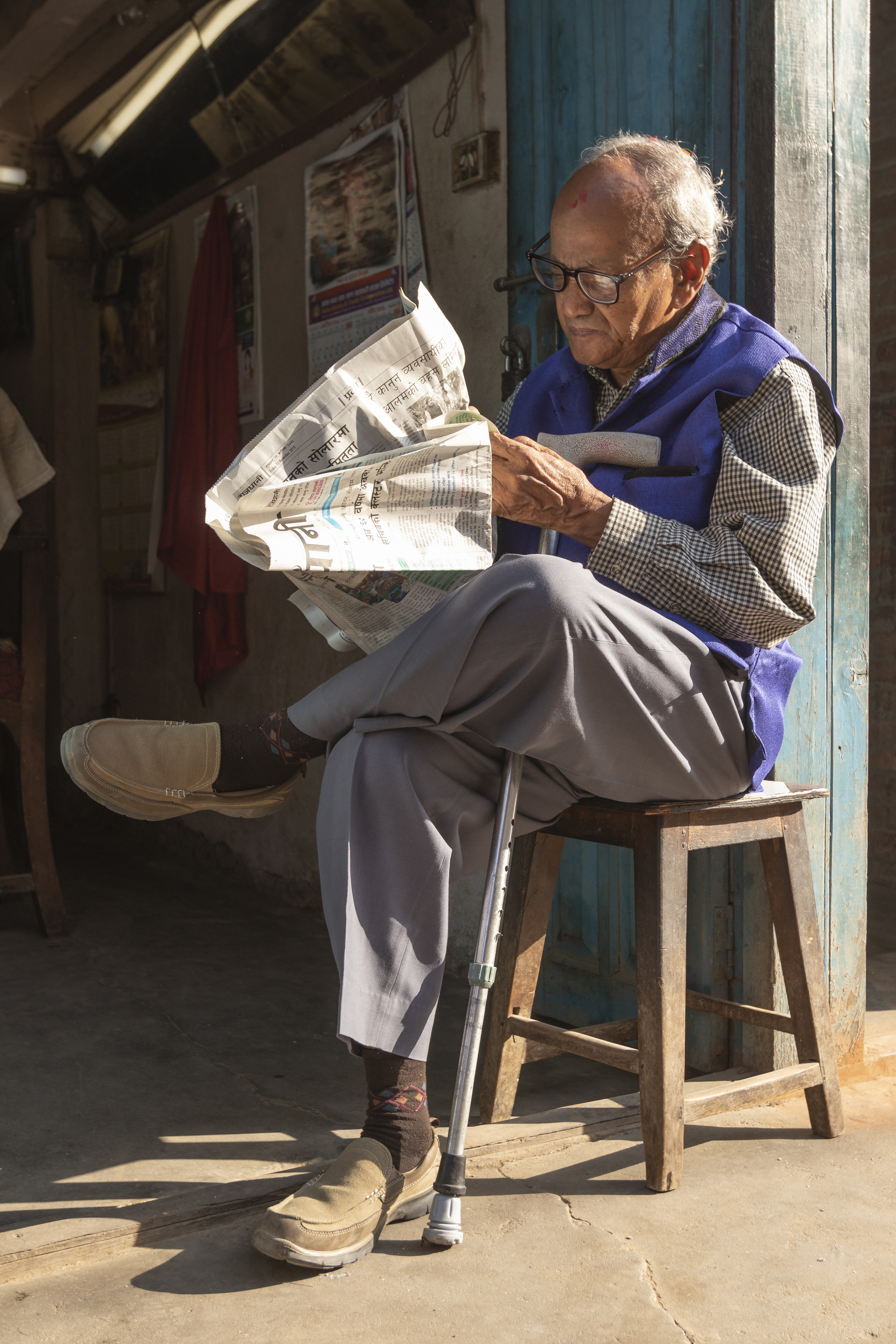
Old man reading newspaper at Basantapur

Comics and editorial cartoons are mediums that use drawings or graphics, usually in combination with text, to convey an entertaining narrative. Many contemporary comics have elements of fantasy and are produced by companies that are part of the entertainment industry. Others have unique authors who offer a more personal, philosophical view of the world and the problems people face. Comics about superheroes such as Superman are of the first type. Examples of the second sort include the individual work over 50 years of Charles M. Schulz, who produced a popular comic called Peanuts about the relationships among a cast of child characters; and Michael Leunig, who entertains by producing whimsical cartoons that also incorporate social criticism. The Japanese Manga style differs from the Western approach in that it encompasses a wide range of genres and themes for a readership of all ages. Caricature uses a kind of graphic entertainment for purposes ranging from merely putting a smile on the viewer's face, to raising social awareness, to highlighting the moral characteristics of a person being caricatured.

=== Comedy ===
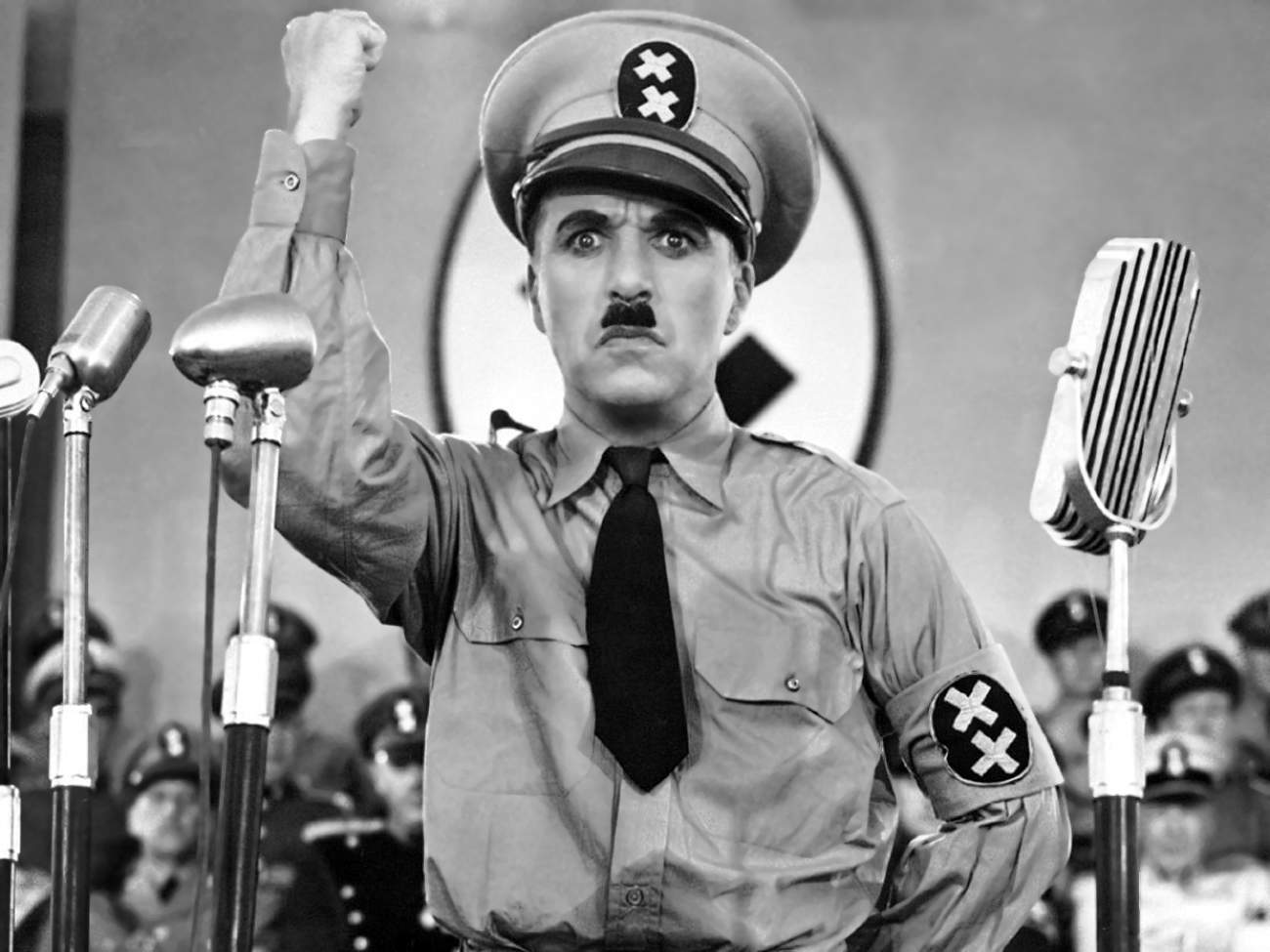
Comedian Charlie Chaplin impersonating Hitler for comic effect in the satirical film The Great Dictator (1940)

Comedy is both a genre of entertainment and a component of it, providing laughter and amusement, whether the comedy is the sole purpose or used as a form of contrast in an otherwise serious piece. It is a valued contributor to many forms of entertainment, including literature, theatre, opera, film and games. In royal courts, such as in the Byzantine court, and presumably also in its wealthy households

mimes were the focus of orchestrated humour, expected or obliged to make fun of all at court, not even excepting the emperor and members of the imperial family. This highly structured role of jester consisted of verbal humour, including teasing, jests, insult, ridicule, and obscenity and non-verbal humour such as slapstick and horseplay in the presence of an audience.

In medieval times, all comic types – the buffoon, jester, hunchback, dwarf, and jokester – were all "considered to be essentially of one comic type: the fool"; while not necessarily funny, the fool represented "the shortcomings of the individual".

Shakespeare wrote seventeen comedies that incorporate many techniques still used by performers and writers of comedy – such as jokes, puns, parody, wit, observational humour, or the unexpected effect of irony. One-liner jokes and satire are also used to comedic effect in literature. In farce, the comedy is a primary purpose.

The meaning of the word "comedy" and the audience's expectations of it have changed over time and vary according to culture. Simple physical comedy such as slapstick is entertaining to a broad range of people of all ages. However, as cultures become more sophisticated, national nuances appear in the style and references so that what is amusing in one culture may be unintelligible in another.

=== Performance ===
Live performances before an audience constitute a major form of entertainment, especially before the invention of audio and video recording. Performance takes a wide range of forms, including theatre, music and drama. In the 16th and 17th centuries, European royal courts presented masques that were complex theatrical entertainments involving dancing, singing and acting. Opera is a similarly demanding performance style that remains popular. It also encompasses all three forms, demanding a high level of musical and dramatic skill, collaboration and, like the masque, production expertise as well.

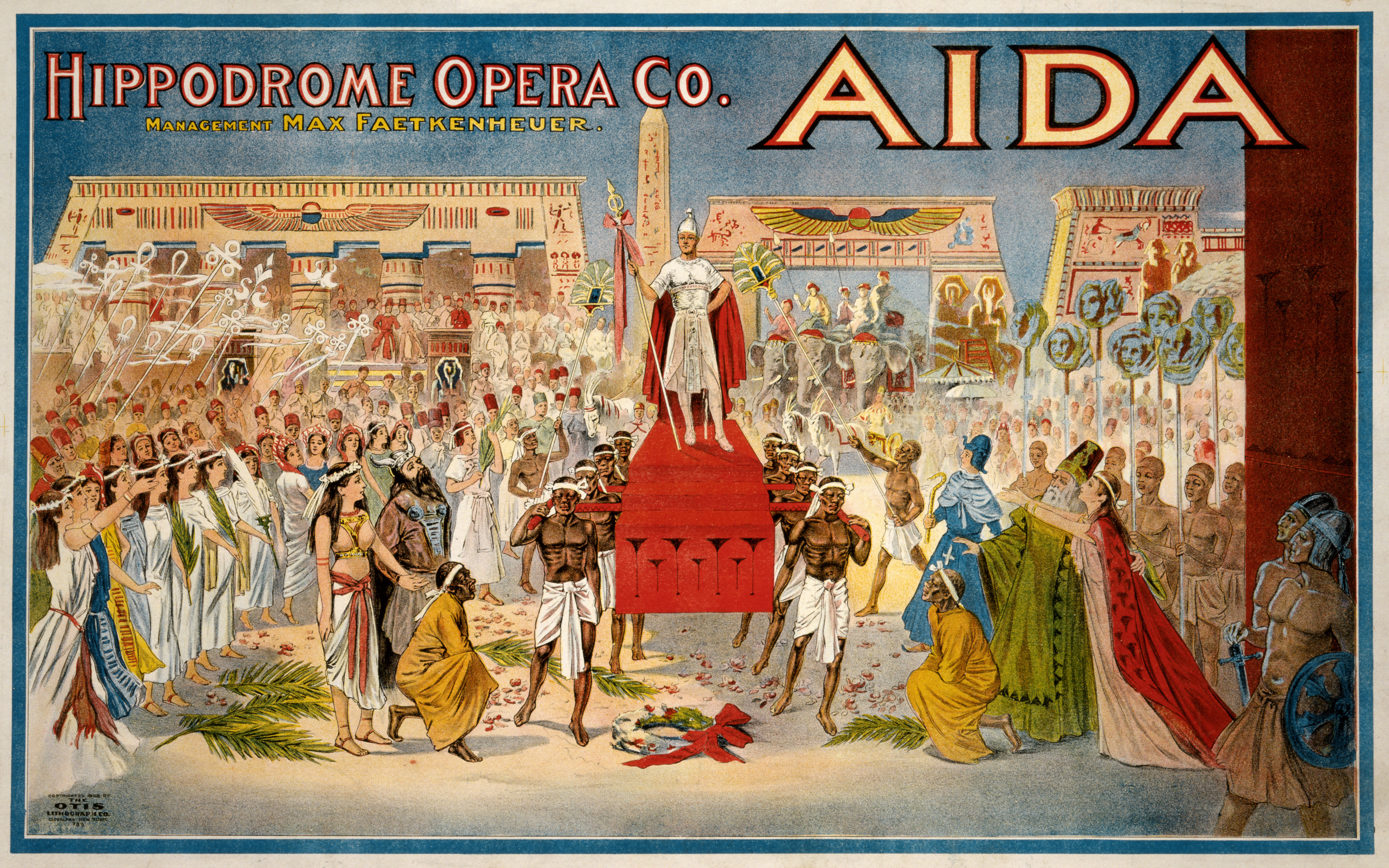
Poster for a 1908 production of Verdi's 1871 opera Aida, performed by the Hippodrome Opera Company of Cleveland, Ohio

Audiences generally show their appreciation of an entertaining performance with applause. However, all performers run the risk of failing to hold their audience's attention and thus, failing to entertain. Audience dissatisfaction is often brutally honest and direct.

Of course you all ought to know that while singing a good song or, or giving a good recitation ... helps to arrest the company's attention ... Such at least was the case with me – the publican devised a plan to bring my entertainment to an end abruptly, and the plan was, he told the waiter to throw a wet towel at me, which, of course, the waiter did ... and I received the wet towel, full force, in the face, which staggered me ... and had the desired effect of putting an end to me giving any more entertainments in the house.

— William McGonagall (Performance artist and poet)

==== Storytelling ====
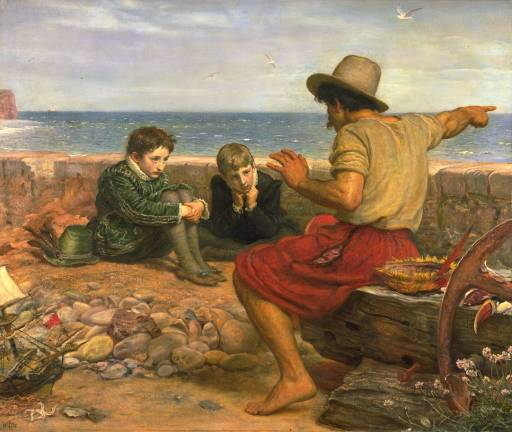
The Boyhood of Raleigh by Sir John Everett Millais, oil on canvas, 1870. A seafarer tells the young Sir Walter Raleigh and his brother the story of what happened out at sea.

Storytelling is an ancient form of entertainment that has influenced almost all other forms. It is "not only entertainment, but it is also thinking through human conflicts and contradictions". Hence, although stories may be delivered directly to a small listening audience, they are also presented as entertainment and used as a component of any piece that relies on a narrative, such as film, drama, ballet, and opera. Written stories have been enhanced by illustrations, often to a very high artistic standard, for example, on illuminated manuscripts and on ancient scrolls such as Japanese ones. Stories remain a common way of entertaining a group that is on a journey. Showing how stories are used to pass the time and entertain an audience of travellers, Chaucer used pilgrims in his literary work The Canterbury Tales in the 14th century, as did Wu Cheng'en in the 16th century in Journey to the West. Even though journeys can now be completed much faster, stories are still told to passengers en route in cars and aeroplanes, either orally or delivered by some form of technology.

The power of stories to entertain is evident in one of the most famous ones – Scheherazade – a story in the Persian professional storytelling tradition, of a woman who saves her own life by telling stories. The connections between the different types of entertainment are shown by the way that stories like this inspire a retelling in another medium, such as music, film or games. For example, composers Rimsky-Korsakov, Ravel and Szymanowski have each been inspired by the Scheherazade story and turned it into an orchestral work; director Pasolini made a film adaptation; and there is an innovative video game based on the tale. Stories may be told wordlessly, in music, dance or puppetry, for example, in the Javanese tradition of wayang, in which the performance is accompanied by a gamelan orchestra or the similarly traditional Punch and Judy show.

Epic narratives, poems, sagas and allegories from all cultures tell such gripping tales that they have inspired countless other stories in all forms of entertainment. Examples include the Hindu Ramayana and Mahabharata; Homer's Odyssey and Iliad; the first Arabic novel Hayy ibn Yaqdhan; the Persian epic Shahnameh; the Sagas of Icelanders and the celebrated Tale of the Genji. Collections of stories, such as Grimms' Fairy Tales or those by Hans Christian Andersen, have been similarly influential. Originally published in the early 19th century, this collection of folk stories significantly influences modern popular culture, which subsequently uses its themes, images, symbols, and structural elements to create new entertainment forms.

Some of the most powerful and long-lasting stories are the foundation stories, also called origin or creation myths, such as the Dreamtime myths of the Aboriginal Australians, the Mesopotamian Epic of Gilgamesh, or the Hawaiian stories of the origin of the world. These too are developed into books, films, music and games in a way that increases their longevity and enhances their entertainment value.

Telling stories

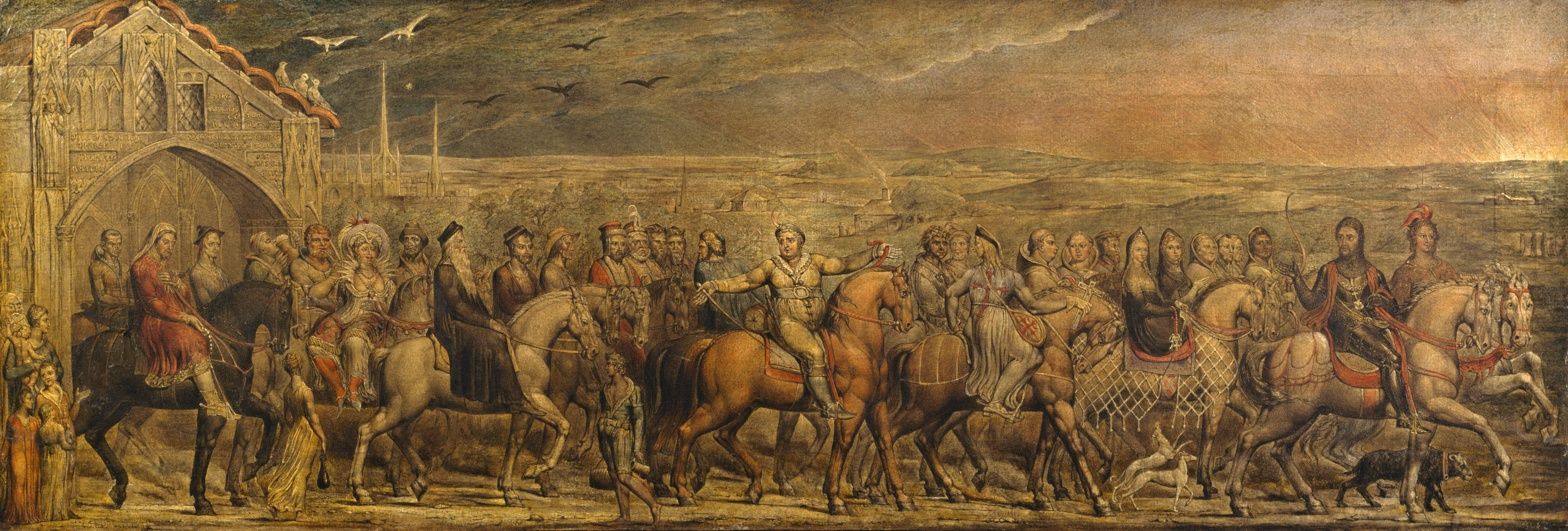
William Blake's painting of the pilgrims in The Canterbury Tales

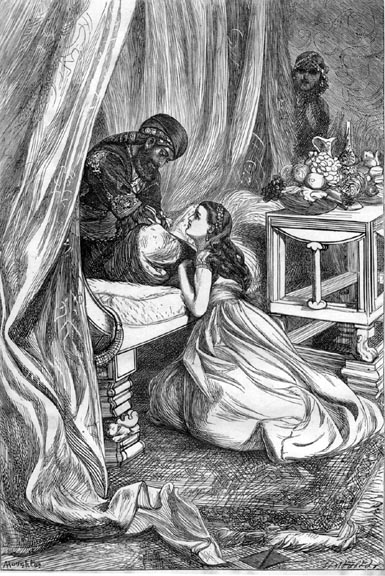
Scheherazade telling her stories to King Shahryar in The Arabian Nights

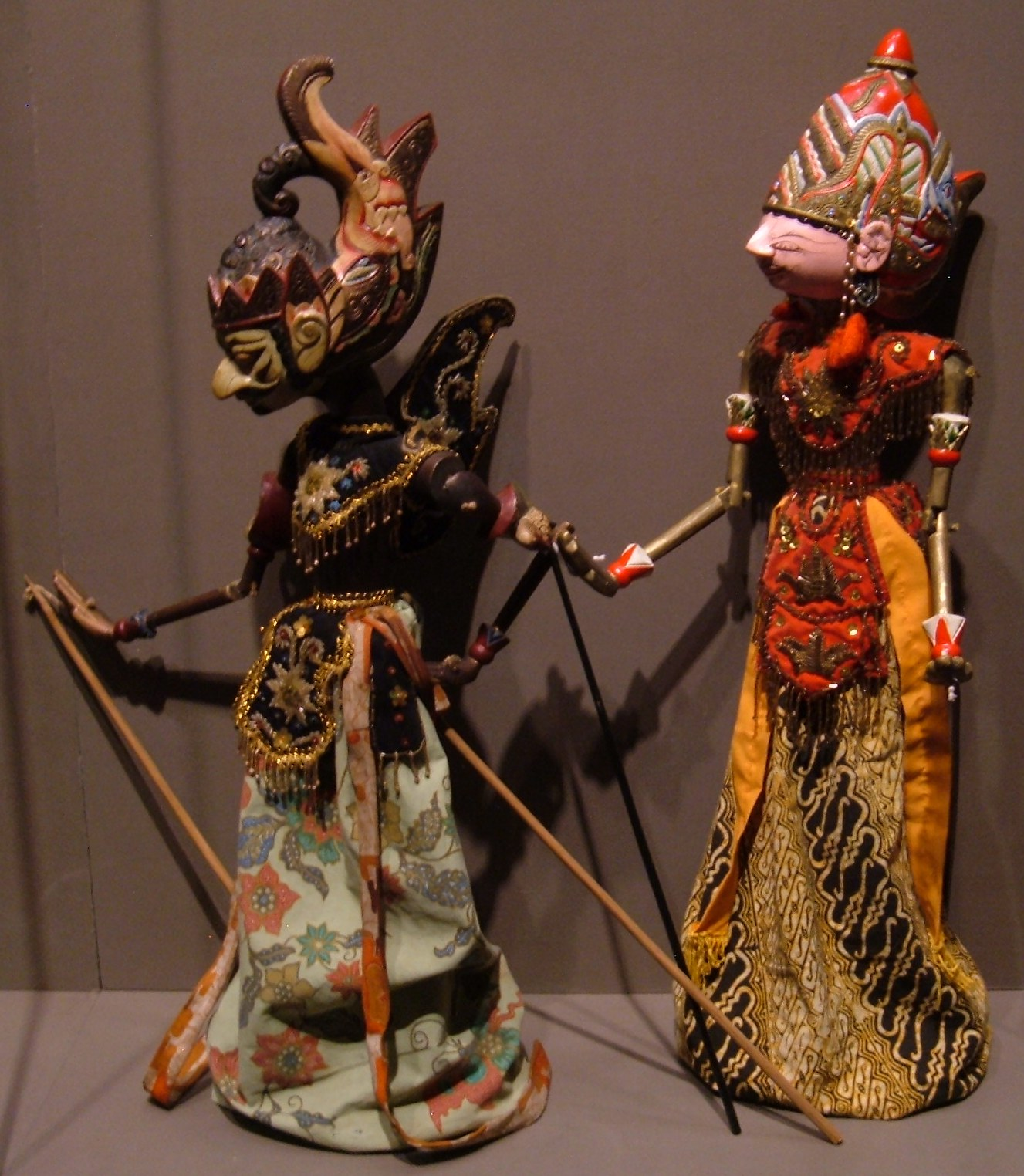
Telling stories via Wayang golek puppets in Java

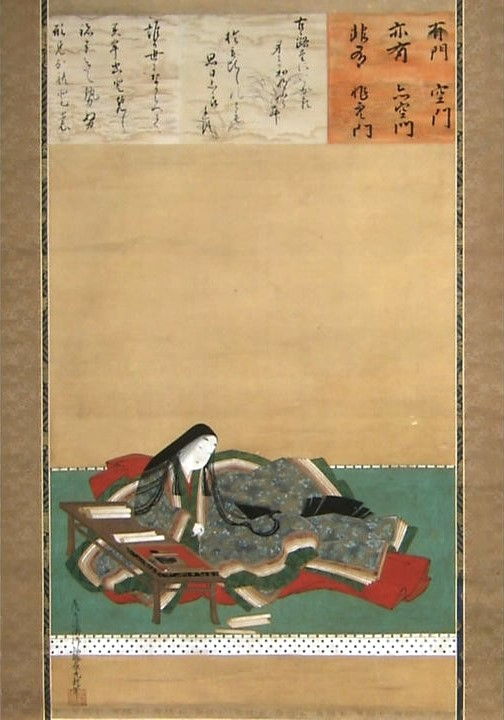
Tosa Mitsuoki illustrating her Tale of Genji

==== Theatre ====
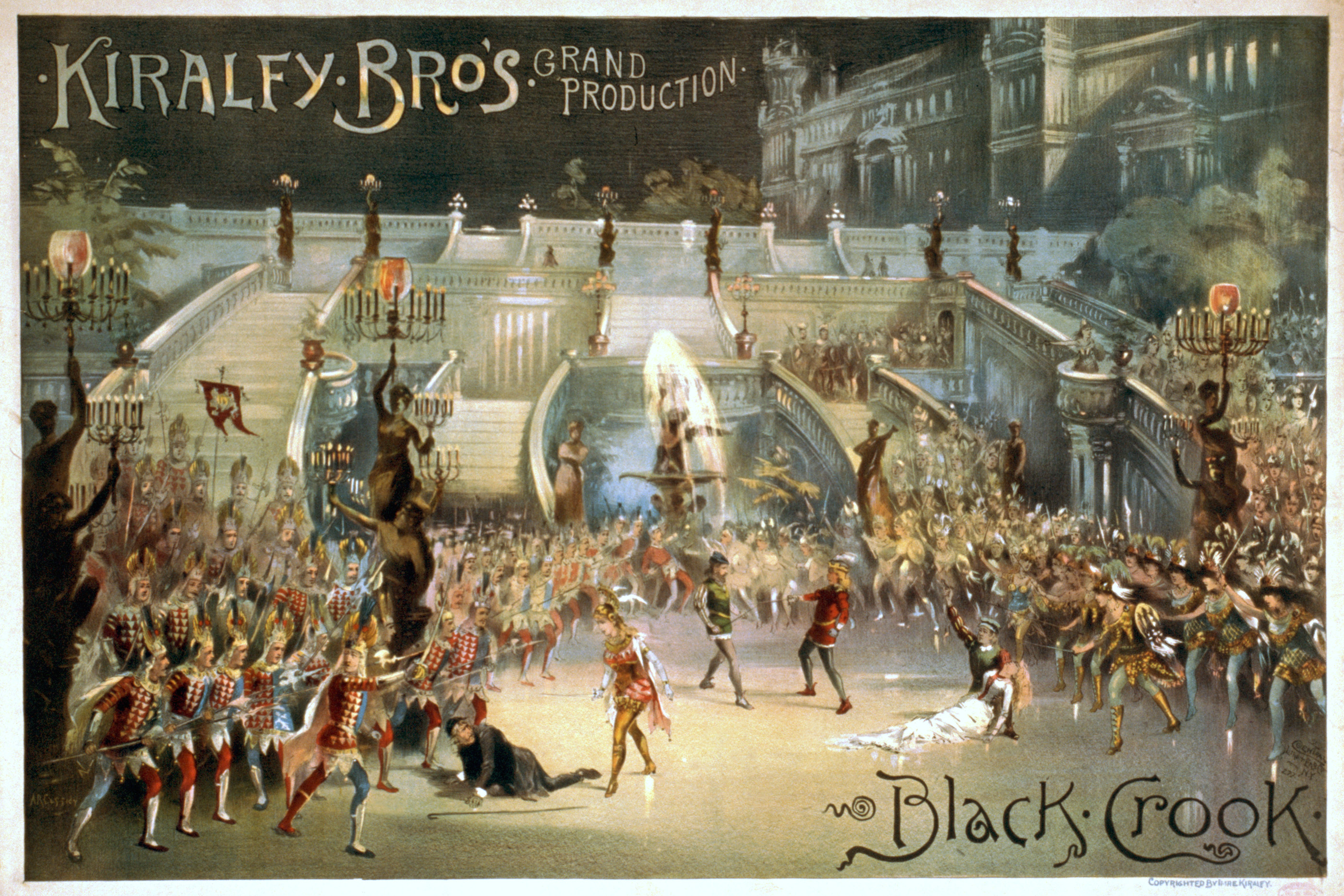
The Black Crook was a long-running musical on Broadway in 1866.

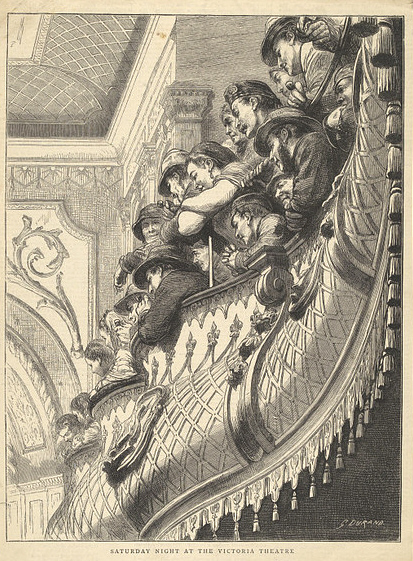
Saturday night audience at the Victoria Theatre, London (1872)

Theatre performances, typically dramatic or musical, are presented on a stage for an audience and have a history that goes back to Hellenistic times when "leading musicians and actors" performed widely at "poetical competitions", for example at "Delphi, Delos, Ephesus". Aristotle and his teacher Plato both wrote on the theory and purpose of theatre. Aristotle posed questions such as "What is the function of the arts in shaping character? Should a member of the ruling class merely watch performances or be a participant and perform? What kind of entertainment should be provided for those who do not belong to the elite?" The "Ptolemys in Egypt, the Seleucids in Pergamum" also had a strong theatrical tradition and later, wealthy patrons in Rome staged "far more lavish productions".

Expectations about the performance and their engagement with it have changed over time. For example, in England during the 18th century, "the prejudice against actresses had faded" and in Europe generally, going to the theatre, once a socially dubious activity, became "a more respectable middle-class pastime" in the late 19th and early 20th centuries, when the variety of popular entertainments increased. Operetta and music halls became available, and new drama theatres such as the Moscow Art Theatre and the Suvorin Theatre in Russia opened. At the same time, commercial newspapers "began to carry theatre columns and reviews" that helped make theatre "a legitimate subject of intellectual debate" in general discussions about art and culture. Audiences began to gather to "appreciate creative achievement, to marvel at, and be entertained by, the prominent 'stars'." Vaudeville and music halls, popular at this time in the United States, England, Canada, Australia and New Zealand, were themselves eventually superseded.

Plays, musicals, monologues, pantomimes, and performance poetry are part of the very long history of theatre, which is also the venue for the type of performance known as comedy. In the 20th century, radio and television, often broadcast live, extended the theatrical tradition that continued to exist alongside the new forms.

The stage and the spaces set out in front of it for an audience create a theatre. All types of stages are used with all types of seating for the audience, including the impromptu or improvised; the temporary; the elaborate; or the traditional and permanent. They are erected indoors or outdoors. The skill of managing, organising and preparing the stage for a performance is known as stagecraft. The audience's experience of the entertainment is affected by their expectations, the stagecraft, the type of stage, and the type and standard of seating provided.

Theatrical entertainment – stages, staging and stagecraft

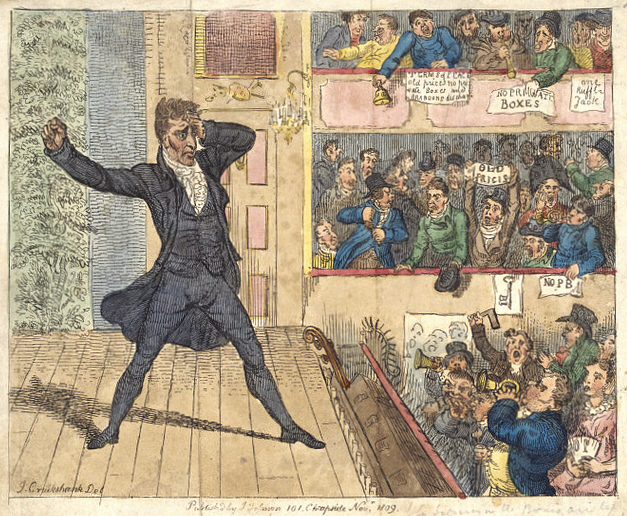
Satirical representation of audience reaction (1809)

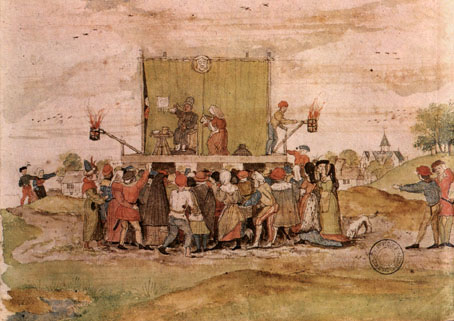
Improvised stage for a public performance at a fair (1642)

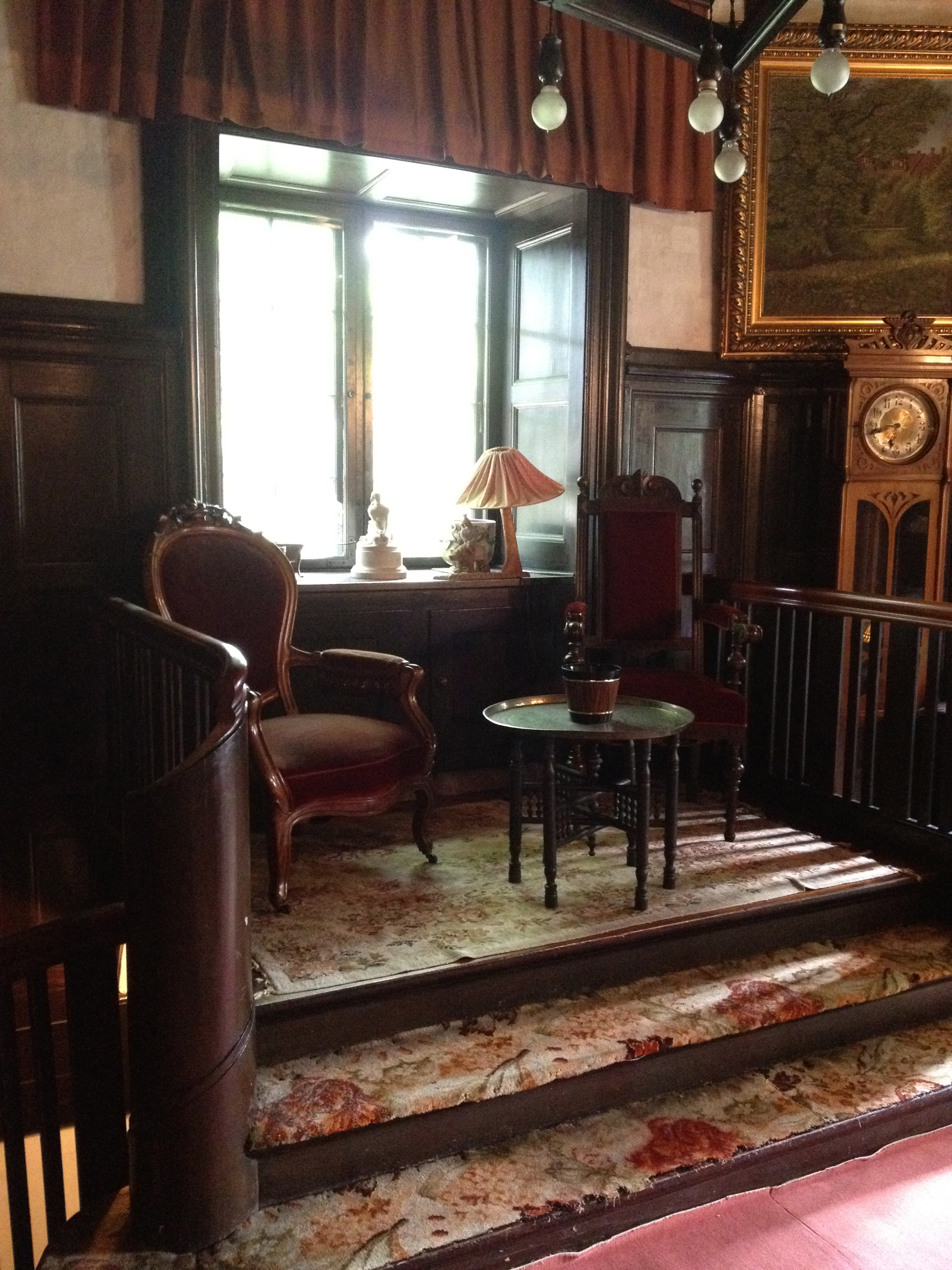
Improvised stage for domestic theatre

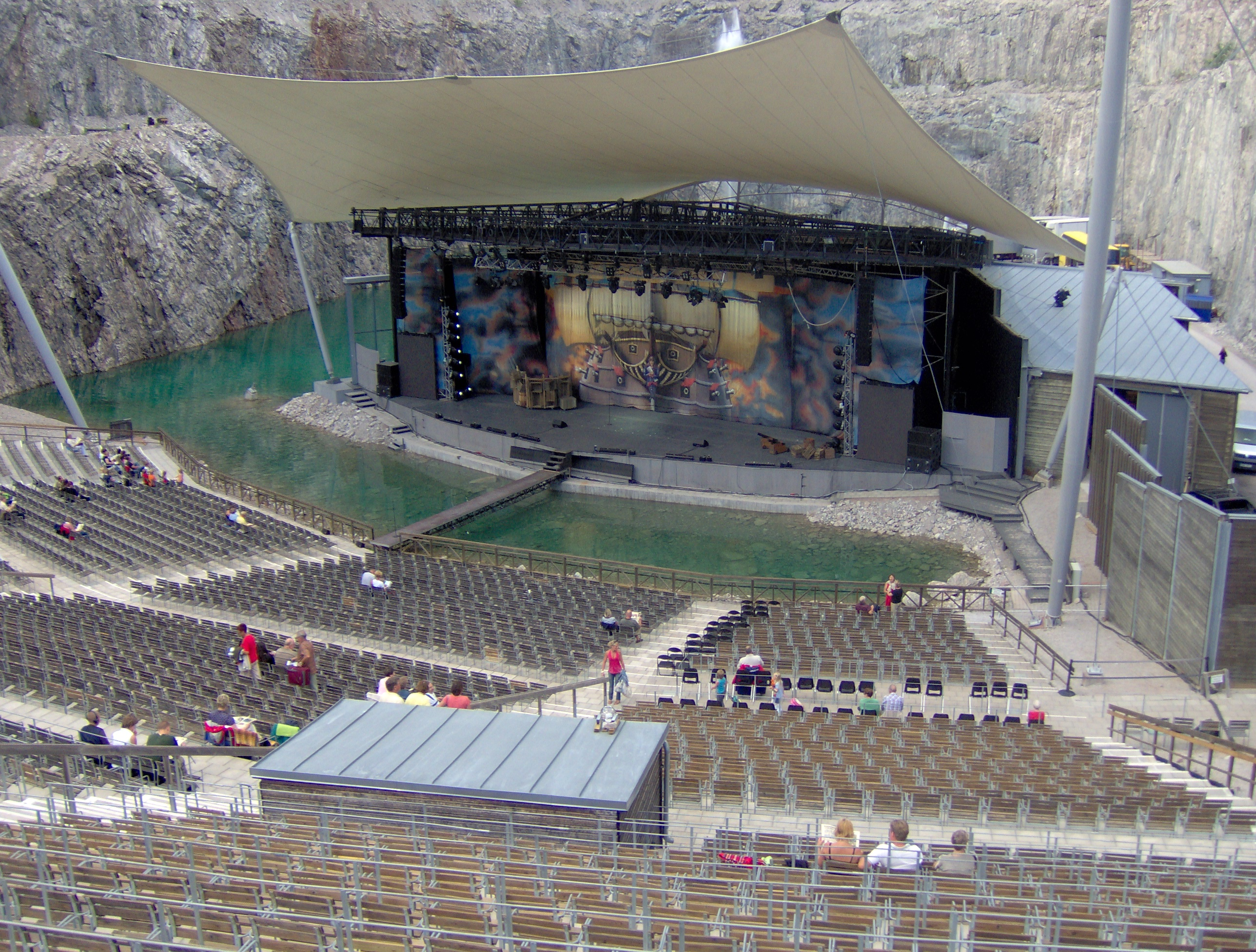
Outdoor stage before a show

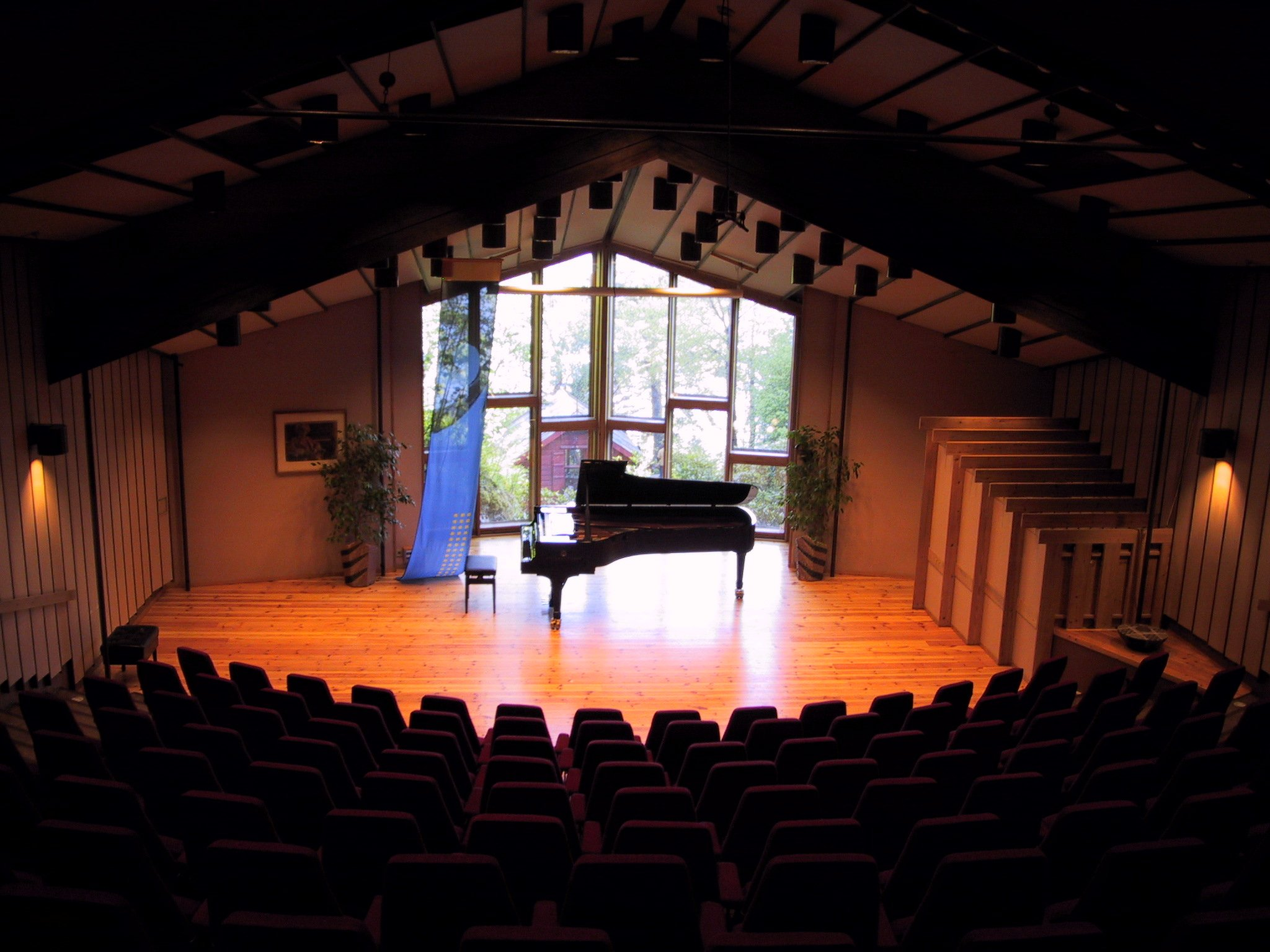
Concert theatre ready for solo instrumentalist

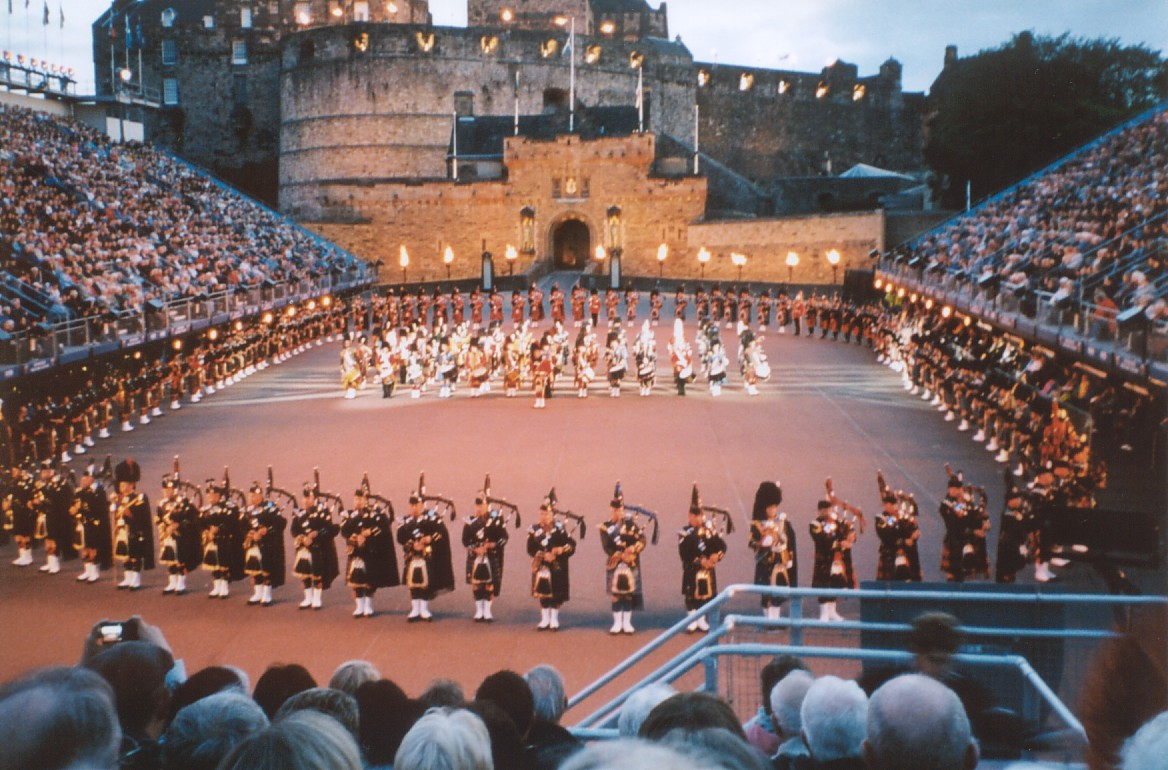
Outdoor theatre created from Edinburgh castle forecourt

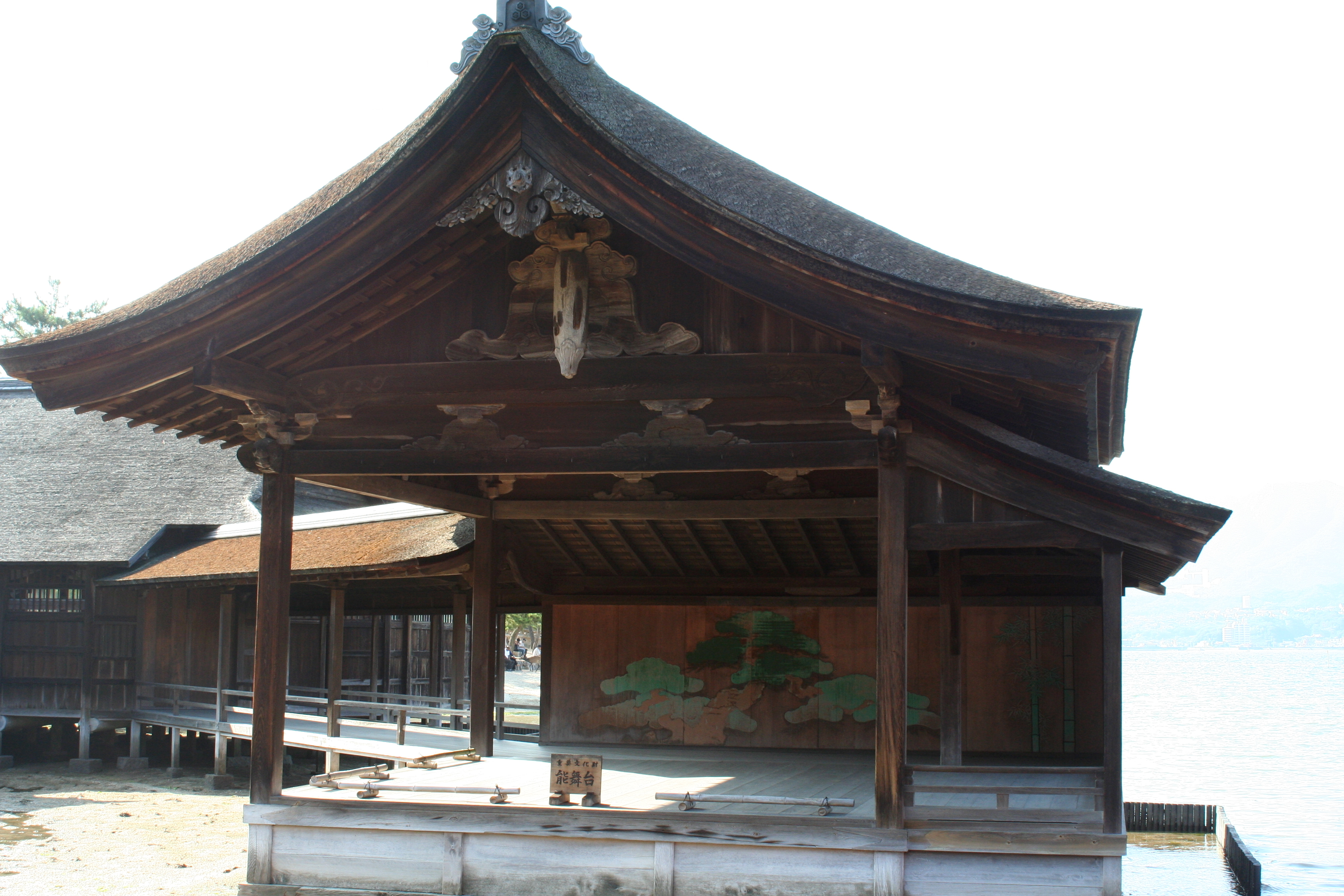
Traditional stage for Japanese Noh theatre

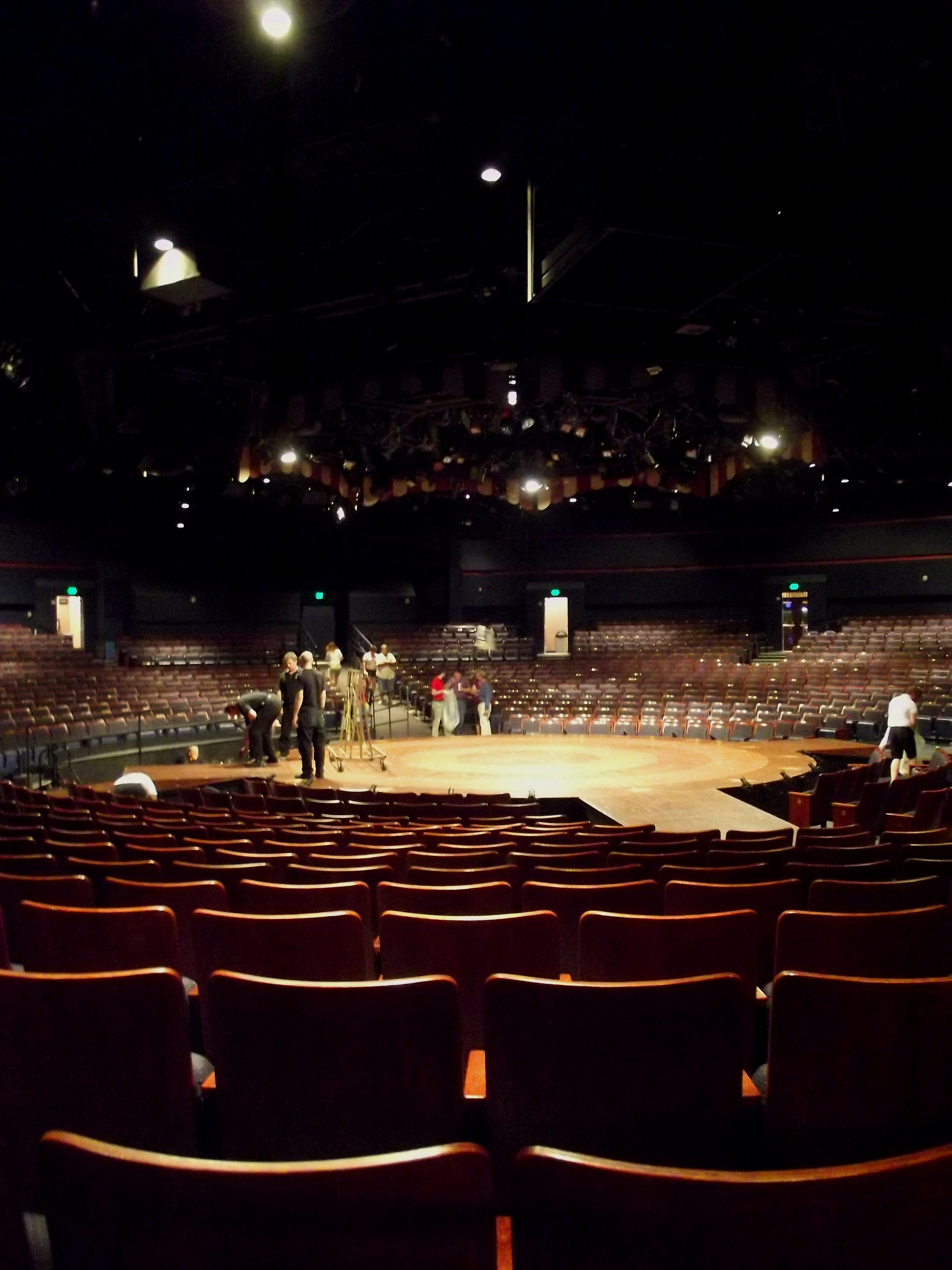
Stage for theatre in the round

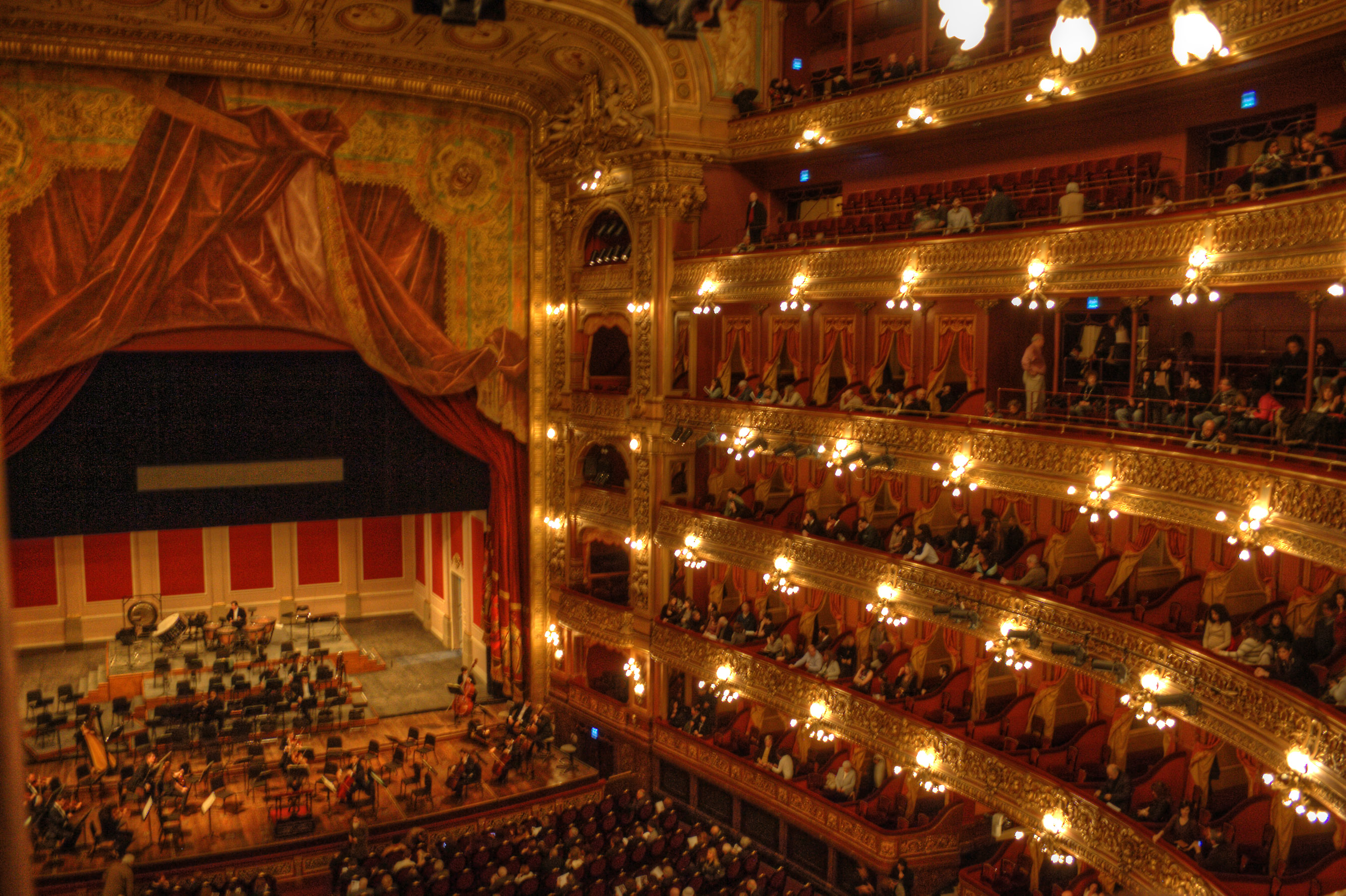
Teatro Colón, a highly decorative, horseshoe theatre

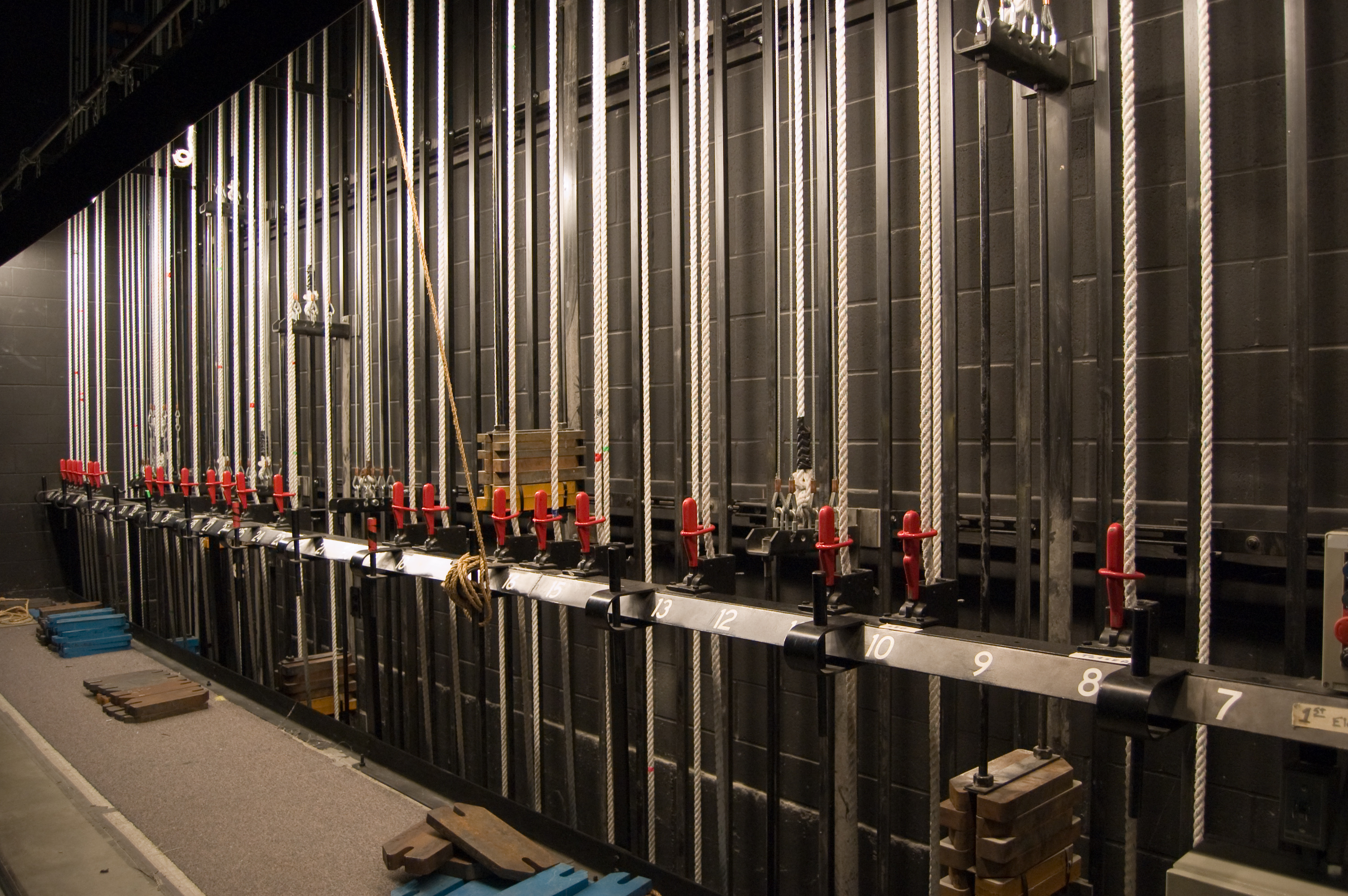
Stagecraft – a locking rail backstage

==== Cinema and film ====
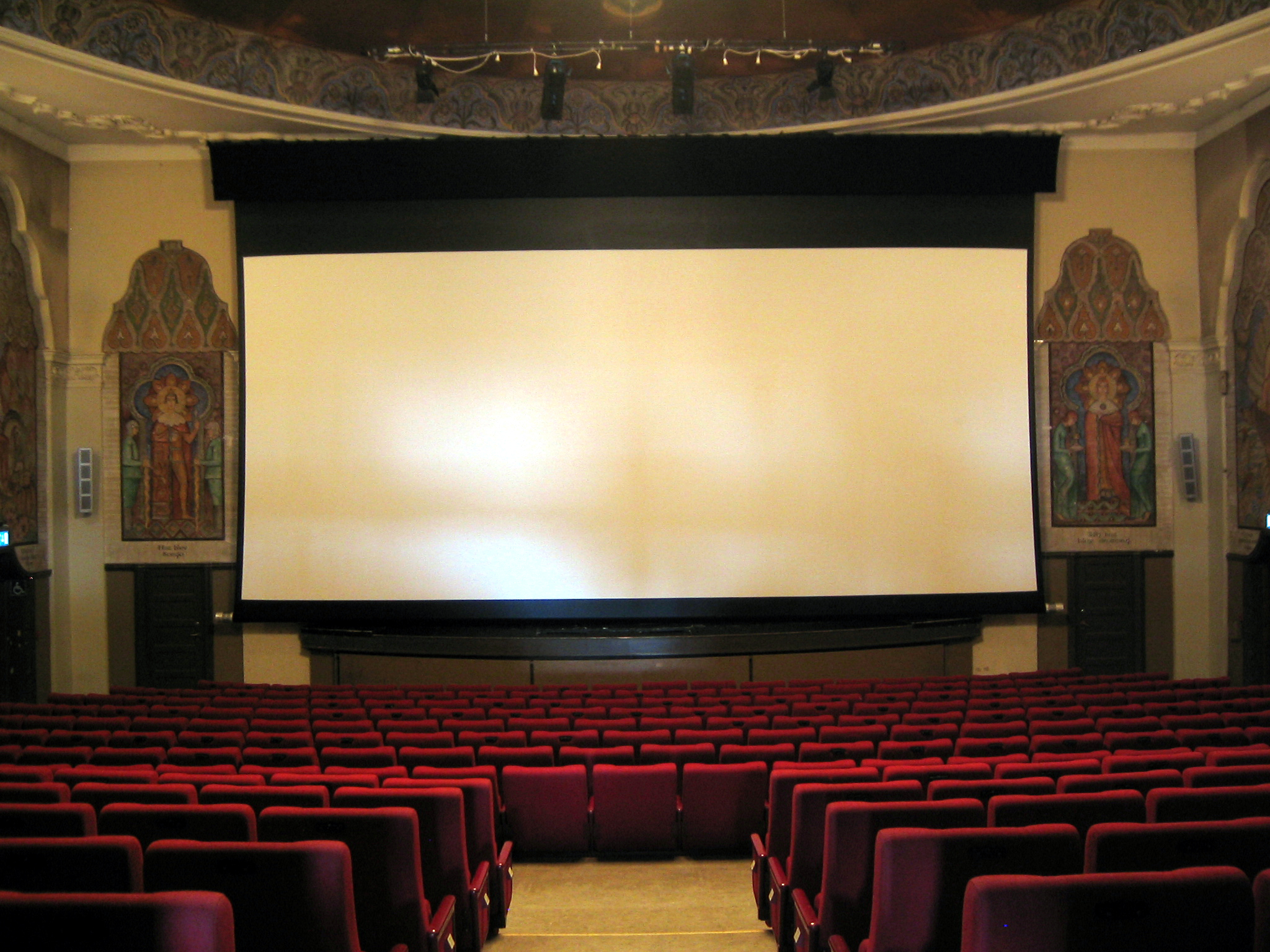
Film audiences are typically seated in comfortable chairs arranged in close rows before a projection screen. Norway (2005)

Films are a major form of entertainment, although not all films have entertainment as their primary purpose: documentary film, for example, aims to create a record or inform, but the two purposes often work together. The medium was a global business from the beginning: "The Lumière brothers were the first to send cameramen throughout the world, instructing them to film everything which could be of interest for the public." In 1908, Pathé launched and distributed newsreels and by World War I, films were meeting an enormous need for mass entertainment. "In the first decade of the [20th] century cinematic programmes combined, at random, fictions and newsfilms." The Americans first "contrived a way of producing an illusion of motion through successive images", but "the French were able to transform a scientific principle into a commercially lucrative spectacle". Film therefore became a part of the entertainment industry from its early days. Increasingly sophisticated techniques have been used in the film medium to delight and entertain audiences. Animation, for example, which involves the display of rapid movement in an artwork, is one of these techniques that particularly appeals to younger audiences. The advent of computer-generated imagery (CGI) in the 21st century made it "possible to do spectacle" more cheaply and "on a scale never dreamed of" by Cecil B. DeMille. From the 1930s to 1950s, movies and radio were the "only mass entertainment"; however, by the second decade of the 21st century, technological changes, economic decisions, risk aversion and globalisation reduced both the quality and range of films being produced. Sophisticated visual effects and CGI techniques, for example, rather than humans, were used not only to create realistic images of people, landscapes and events (both real and fantastic) but also to animate non-living items such as Lego toys, normally used as entertainment as a game in physical form. Creators of The Lego Movie "wanted the audience to believe they were looking at actual Lego bricks on a tabletop that were shot with a real camera, not what we actually did, which was create vast environments with digital bricks inside the computer." The convergence of computers and film has allowed entertainment to be presented in a new way; in addition, the technology has allowed for those with the personal resources to screen films in a home theatre, recreating in a private venue the quality and experience of a public theatre. This is similar to the way that the nobility in earlier times could stage private musical performances or the use of domestic theatres in large homes to perform private plays in earlier centuries.

Films also re-imagine entertainment from other forms, turning stories, books and plays, for example, into new entertainments. The Story of Film, a documentary about the history of film, gives a survey of global achievements and innovations in the medium, as well as changes in the conception of film-making. It demonstrates that while some films, particularly those in the Hollywood tradition that combines "realism and melodramatic romanticism", are intended as a form of escapism, others require a deeper engagement or more thoughtful response from their audiences. For example, the award-winning Senegalese film Xala takes government corruption as its theme. Charlie Chaplin's film The Great Dictator was a brave and innovative parody, also on a political theme. Stories that are thousands of years old, such as Noah, have been re-interpreted in film, applying familiar literary devices such as allegory and personification with new techniques such as CGI to explore big themes such as "human folly", good and evil, courage and despair, love, faith, and death – themes that have been a mainstay of entertainment across all its forms.

As in other media, excellence and achievement in films is recognised through a range of awards, including ones from the American Academy of Motion Picture Arts and Sciences, the British Academy of Film and Television Arts, the Cannes International Film Festival in France and the Asia Pacific Screen Awards.

==== Dance ====
Contra dancers at a ball in New Hampshire, United States (silent video)

The many forms of dance provide entertainment for all age groups and cultures. Dance can be serious in tone, such as when it is used to express a culture's history or important stories; it may be provocative; or it may put in the service of comedy. Since it combines many forms of entertainment – music, movement, storytelling, theatre – it provides a good example of the various ways that these forms can be combined to create entertainment for different purposes and audiences.

Dance is "a form of cultural representation" that involves not just dancers, but "choreographers, audience members, patrons and impresarios ... coming from all over the globe and from vastly varied time periods." Whether from Africa, Asia or Europe, dance is constantly negotiating the realms of political, social, spiritual and artistic influence." Even though dance traditions may be limited to one cultural group, they all develop. For example, in Africa, there are "Dahomean dances, Hausa dances, Masai dances and so forth." Ballet is an example of a highly developed Western form of dance that moved to the theatres from the French court during the time of Louis XIV, with the dancers becoming professional theatrical performers. Some dances – such as the quadrille, a square dance that "emerged during the Napoleonic years in France", and other country dances – were once popular at social gatherings like balls, but are now rarely performed. On the other hand, many folk dances (such as Scottish Highland dancing and Irish dancing) have evolved into competitions, which, by adding to their audiences, have increased their entertainment value. "Irish dance theatre, which sometimes features traditional Irish steps and music, has developed into a major dance form with an international reputation."

Since dance is often "associated with the female body and women's experiences", female dancers, who dance to entertain, have in some cases been regarded as distinct from "decent" women because they "use their bodies to make a living instead of hiding them as much as possible". Society's attitudes to female dancers depend on the culture, its history and the entertainment industry itself. For example, while some cultures regard any dancing by women as "the most shameful form of entertainment", other cultures have established venues such as strip clubs where deliberately erotic or sexually provocative dances such as striptease are performed in public by professional women dancers for mostly male audiences.

Various political regimes have sought to control or ban dancing or specific types of dancing, sometimes because of disapproval of the music or clothes associated with it. Nationalism, authoritarianism and racism have played a part in banning dances or dancing. For example, during the Nazi regime, American dances such as swing, regarded as "completely un-German", had "become a public offense and needed to be banned". Similarly, in Shanghai, China, in the 1930s, "dancing and nightclubs had come to symbolise the excess that plagued Chinese society", and officials wondered if "other forms of entertainment such as brothels" should also be banned. Banning had the effect of making "the dance craze" even greater. In Ireland, the Public Dance Hall Act of 1935 "banned – but did not stop – dancing at the crossroads and other popular dance forms such as house and barn dances." In the US, various dances were once banned; some, like burlesque, were considered suggestive, while others, like the Twist, were associated with African Americans. "African American dancers were typically banned from performing in minstrel shows until after the American Civil War."

Dances can be performed solo, in pairs, in groups, or by massed performers. They might be improvised or highly choreographed; spontaneous for personal entertainment (such as when children begin dancing for themselves); for a private audience, a paying audience, a world audience, or an audience interested in a particular dance genre. They might be a part of a celebration, such as a wedding or New Year, or a cultural ritual with a specific purpose, such as a dance by warriors like a haka. Some dances, such as traditional dance and ballet, need a very high level of skill and training; others, such as the can-can, require a very high level of energy and physical fitness. Entertaining the audience is a normal part of dance, but its physicality often also produces joy for the dancers themselves.

Dance across cultures

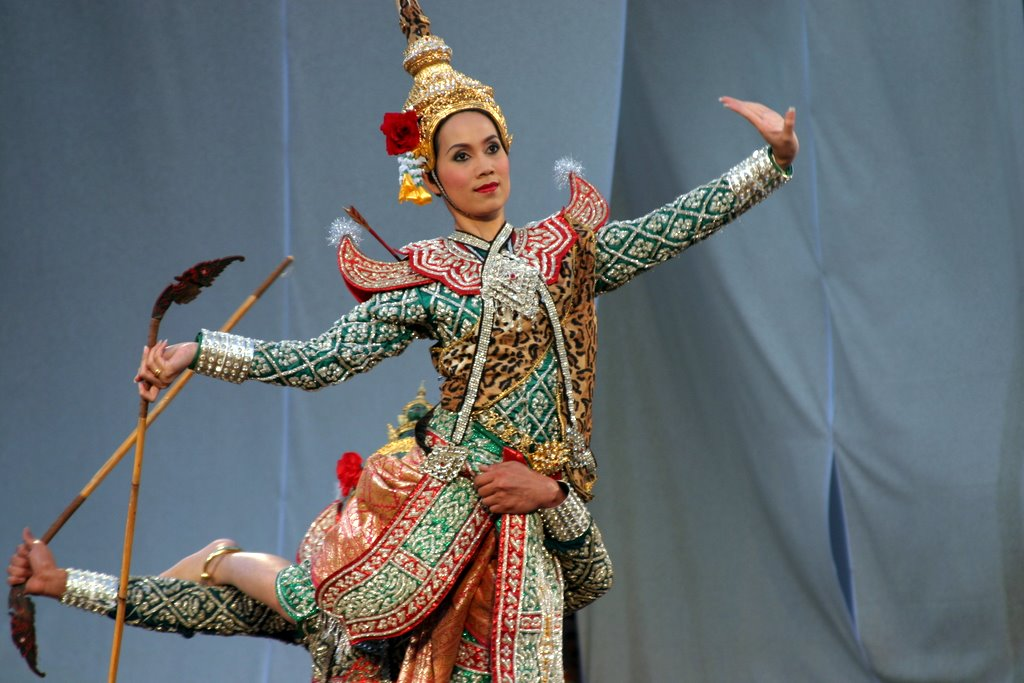
Traditional dancer (Thailand)

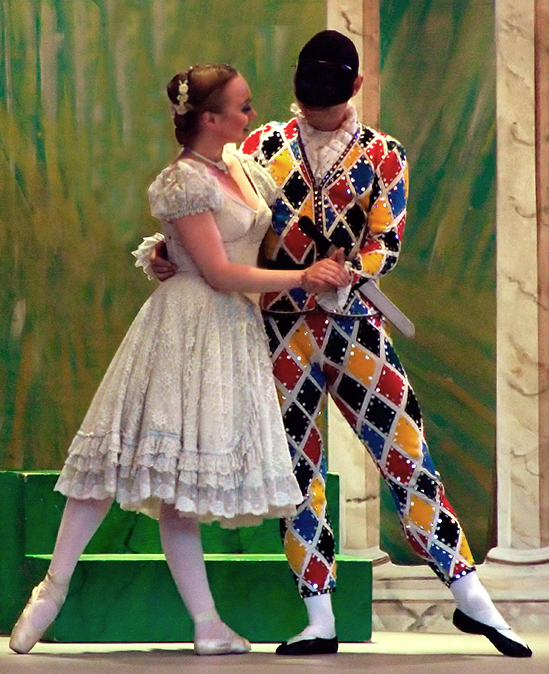
Harlequin and Columbine (Denmark)

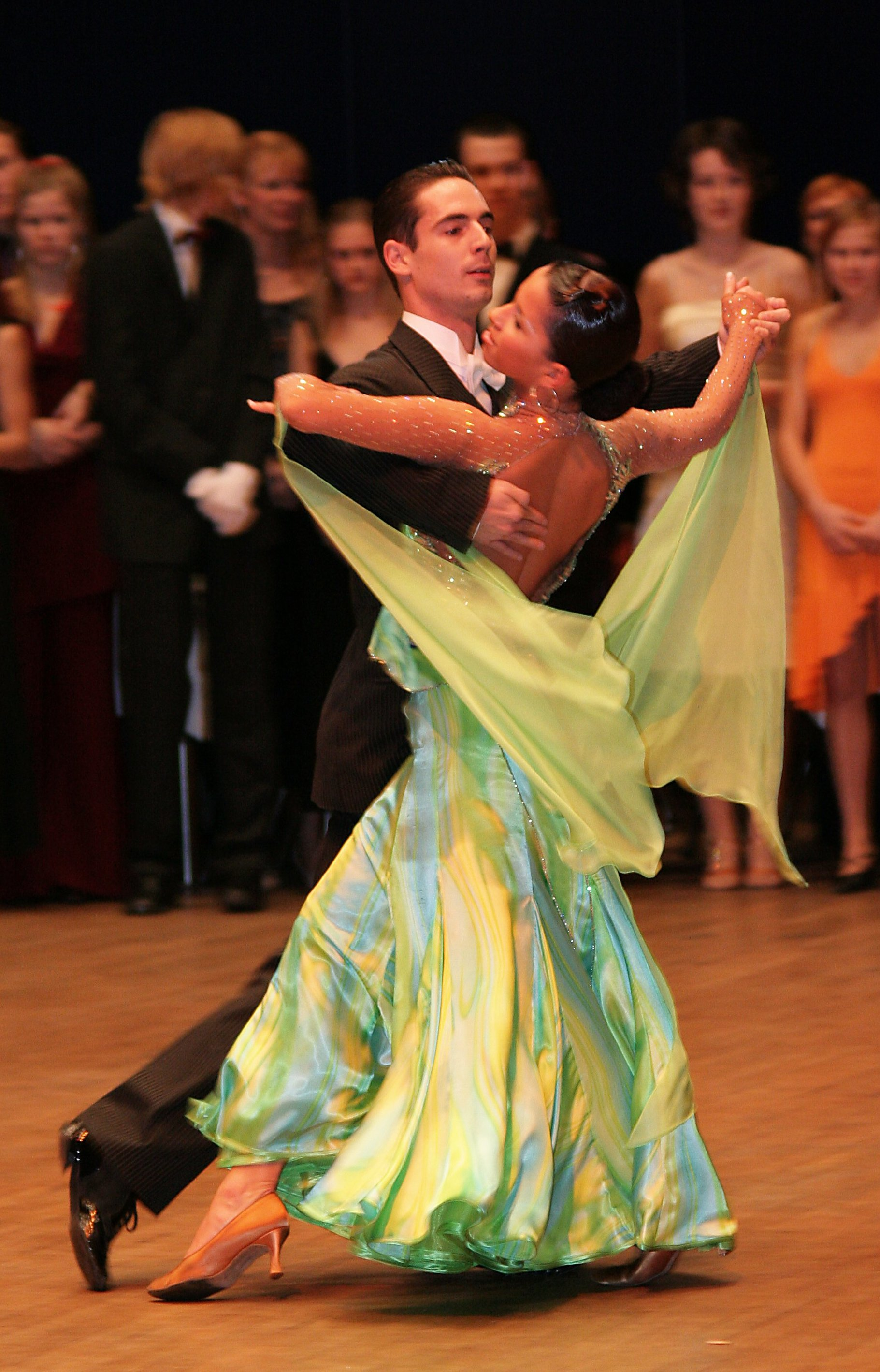
Ballroom dancing (Czech Republic)

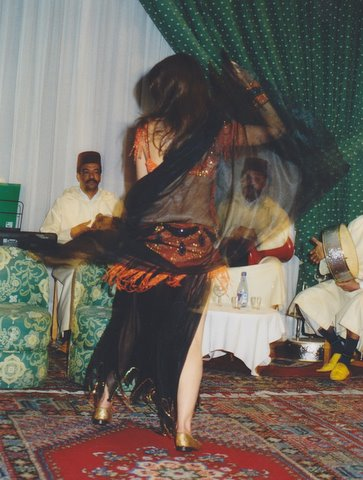
Belly dancer (Morocco)

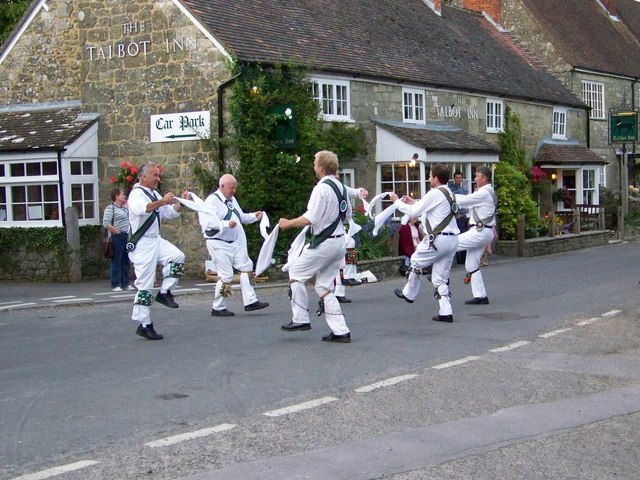
Morris dancing (England)

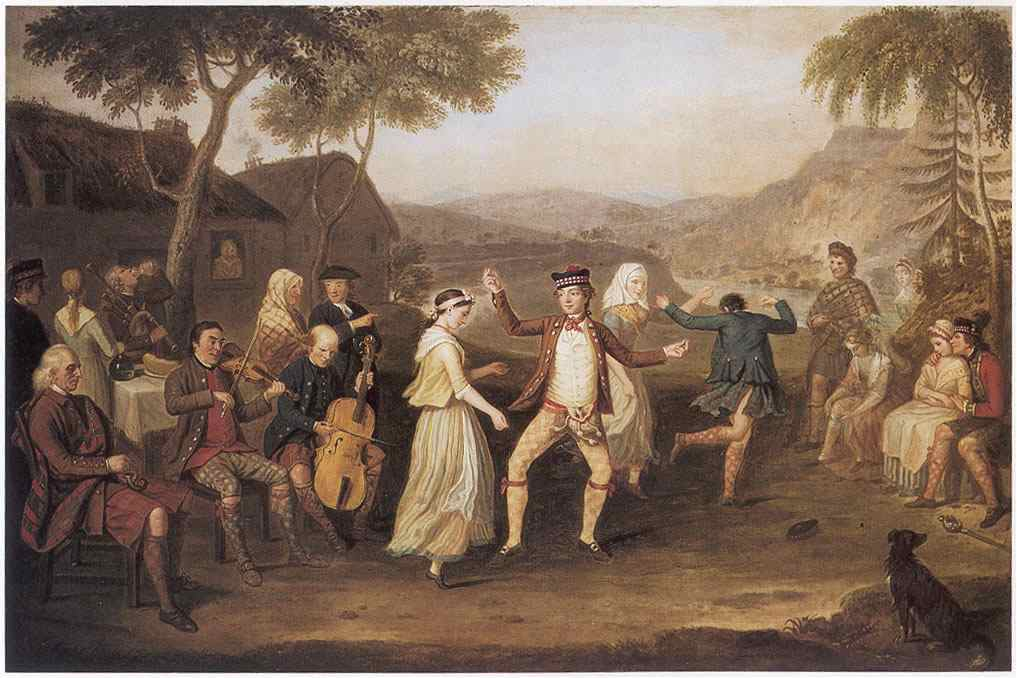
Highland wedding (Scotland, 1780)

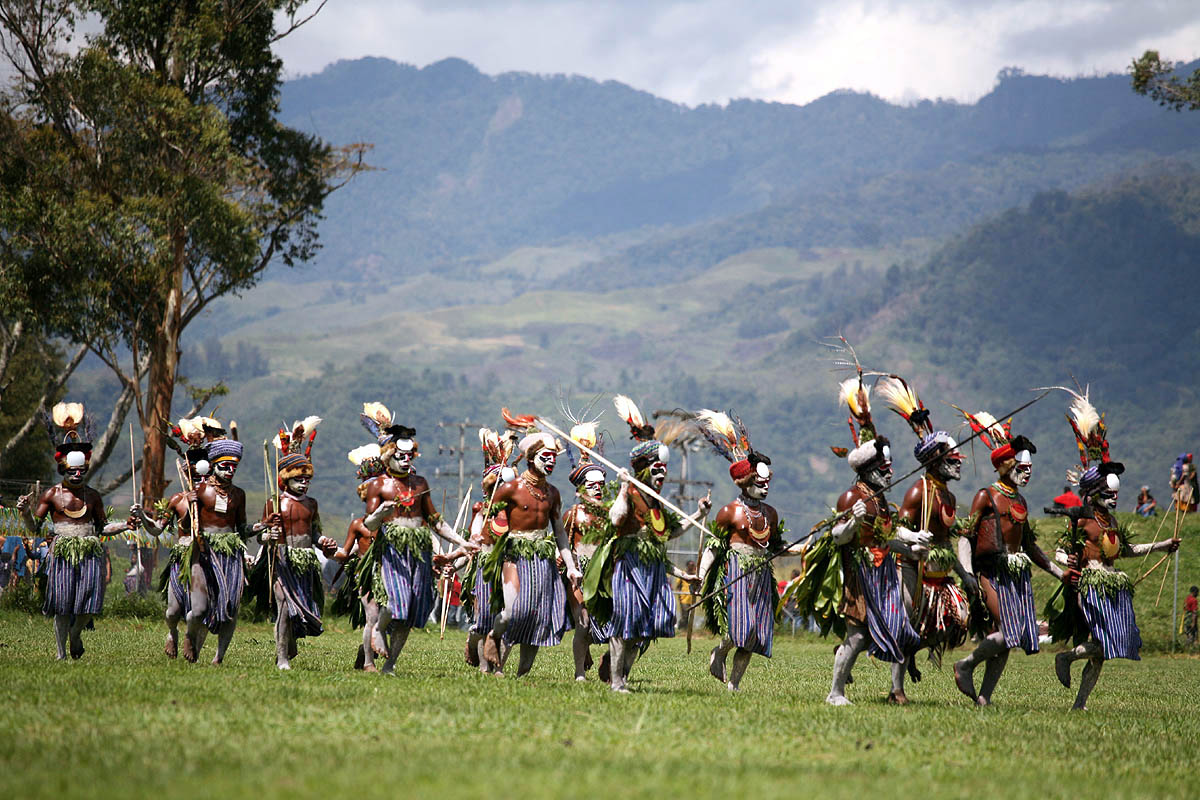
Warrior dancers (Papua New Guinea)

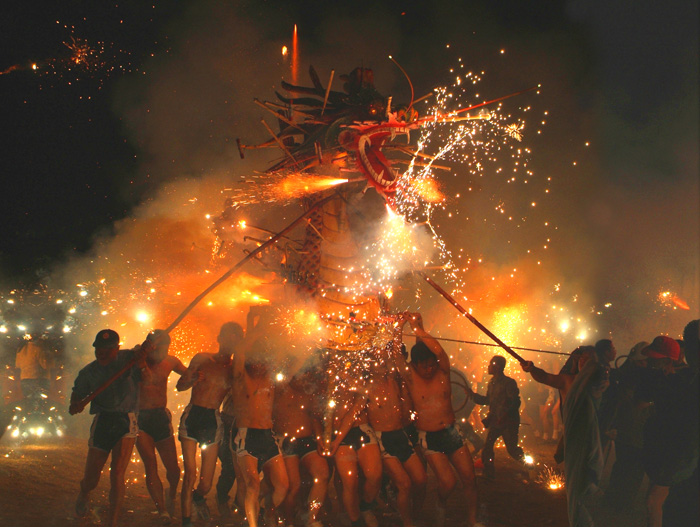
Fire Dragon dance for Chinese New Year

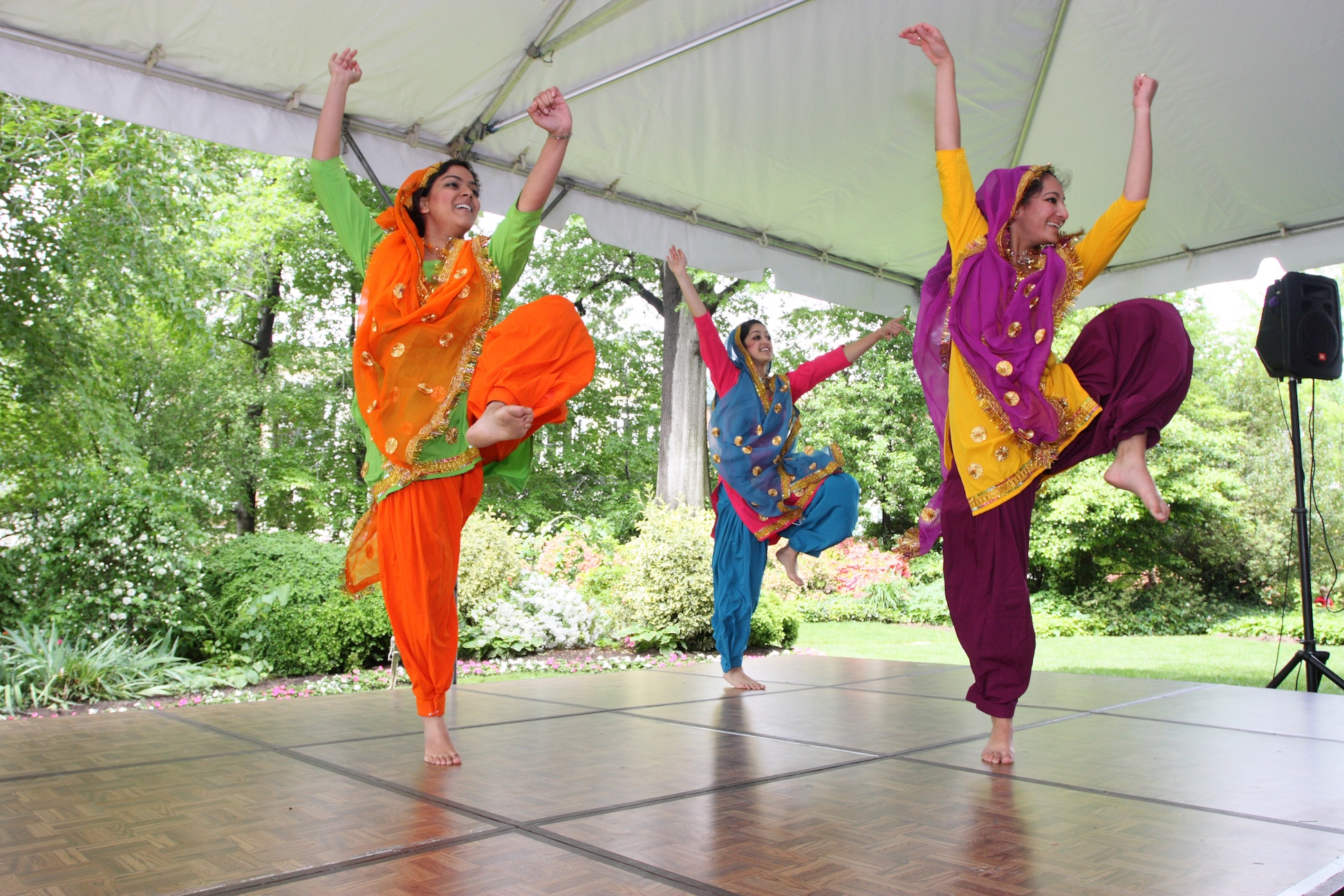
Bhangra dancers at the International Children's Festival

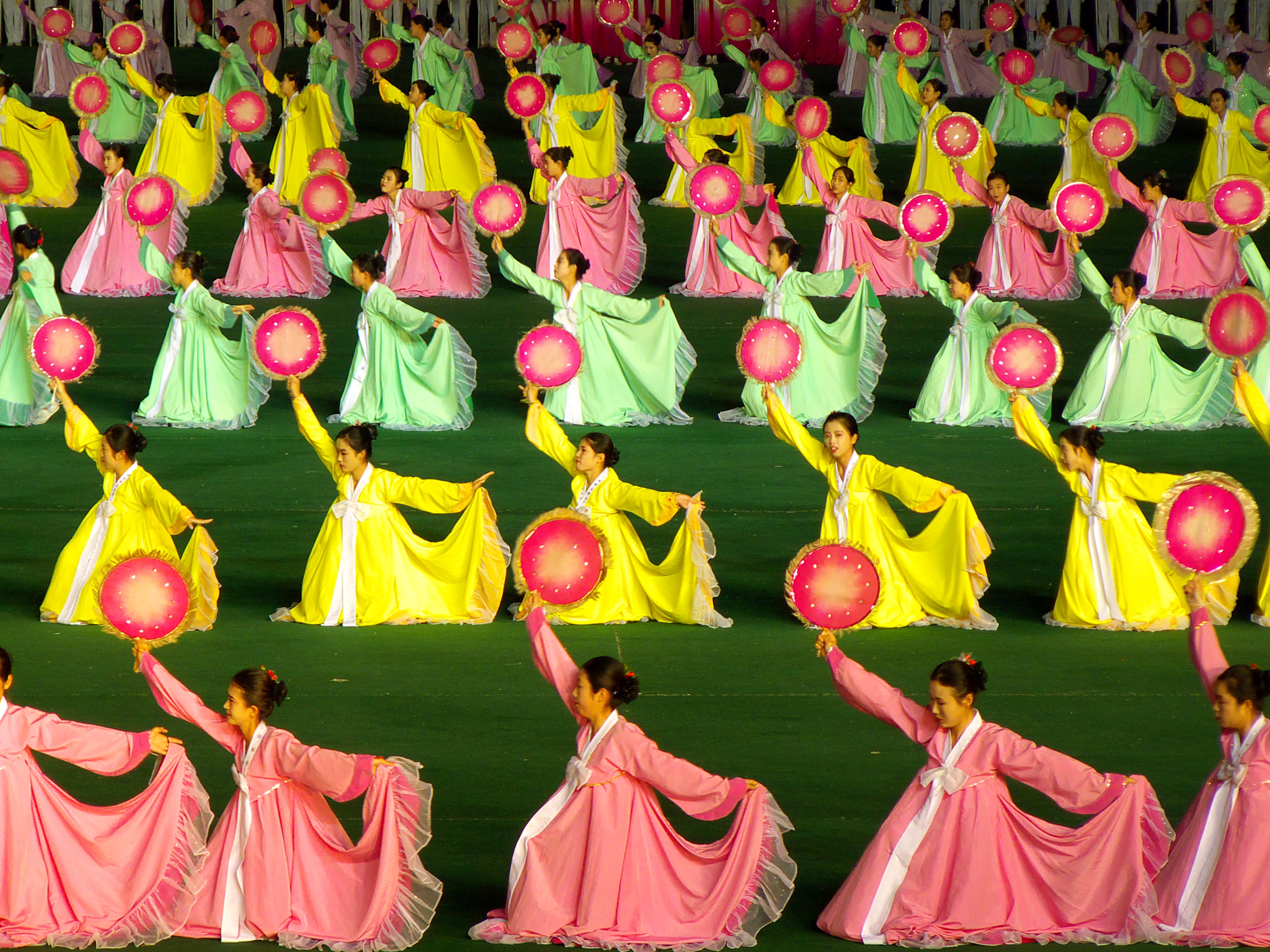
Children in Mass Games (North Korea)

==== Animals ====
Animals have been used for the purposes of entertainment for millennia. They have been hunted for entertainment (as opposed to hunted for food); displayed while they hunt for prey; watched when they compete with each other; and watched while they perform a trained routine for human amusement. The Romans, for example, were entertained both by competitions involving wild animals and acts performed by trained animals. They watched as "lions and bears danced to the music of pipes and cymbals; horses were trained to kneel, bow, dance and prance ... acrobats turning handsprings over wild lions and vaulting over wild leopards." There were "violent confrontations with wild beasts" and "performances over time became more brutal and bloodier".

Animals that perform trained routines or "acts" for human entertainment include fleas in flea circuses, dolphins in dolphinaria, and monkeys doing tricks for an audience on behalf of the player of a street organ. Animals kept in zoos in ancient times were often kept there for later use in the arena as entertainment or for their entertainment value as exotica.

Many contests between animals are now regarded as sports – for example, horse racing is regarded as both a sport and an important source of entertainment. Its economic impact means that it is also considered a global industry, one in which horses are carefully transported around the world to compete in races. In Australia, the horse race run on Melbourne Cup Day is a public holiday and the public regards the race as an important annual event. Like horse racing, camel racing requires human riders, while greyhound racing does not. People find it entertaining to watch animals race competitively, whether they are trained, like horses, camels or dogs, or untrained, like cockroaches.

The use of animals for entertainment is sometimes controversial, especially the hunting of wild animals. Some contests between animals, once popular entertainment for the public, have become illegal because of the cruelty involved. Among these are blood sports such as bear-baiting, dog fighting and cockfighting. Other contests involving animals remain controversial and have both supporters and detractors. For example, the conflict between opponents of pigeon shooting, who view it as "a cruel and moronic exercise in marksmanship, and proponents, who view it as entertainment", has been tested in a court of law. Fox hunting, which involves the use of horses as well as hounds, and bullfighting, which has a strong theatrical component, are two entertainments that have a long and significant cultural history. They both involve animals and are variously regarded as sport, entertainment or cultural tradition. Among the organisations set up to advocate for the rights of animals are some whose concerns include the use of animals for entertainment. However, "in many cases of animal advocacy groups versus organisations accused of animal abuse, both sides have cultural claims."

Animals used for entertainment

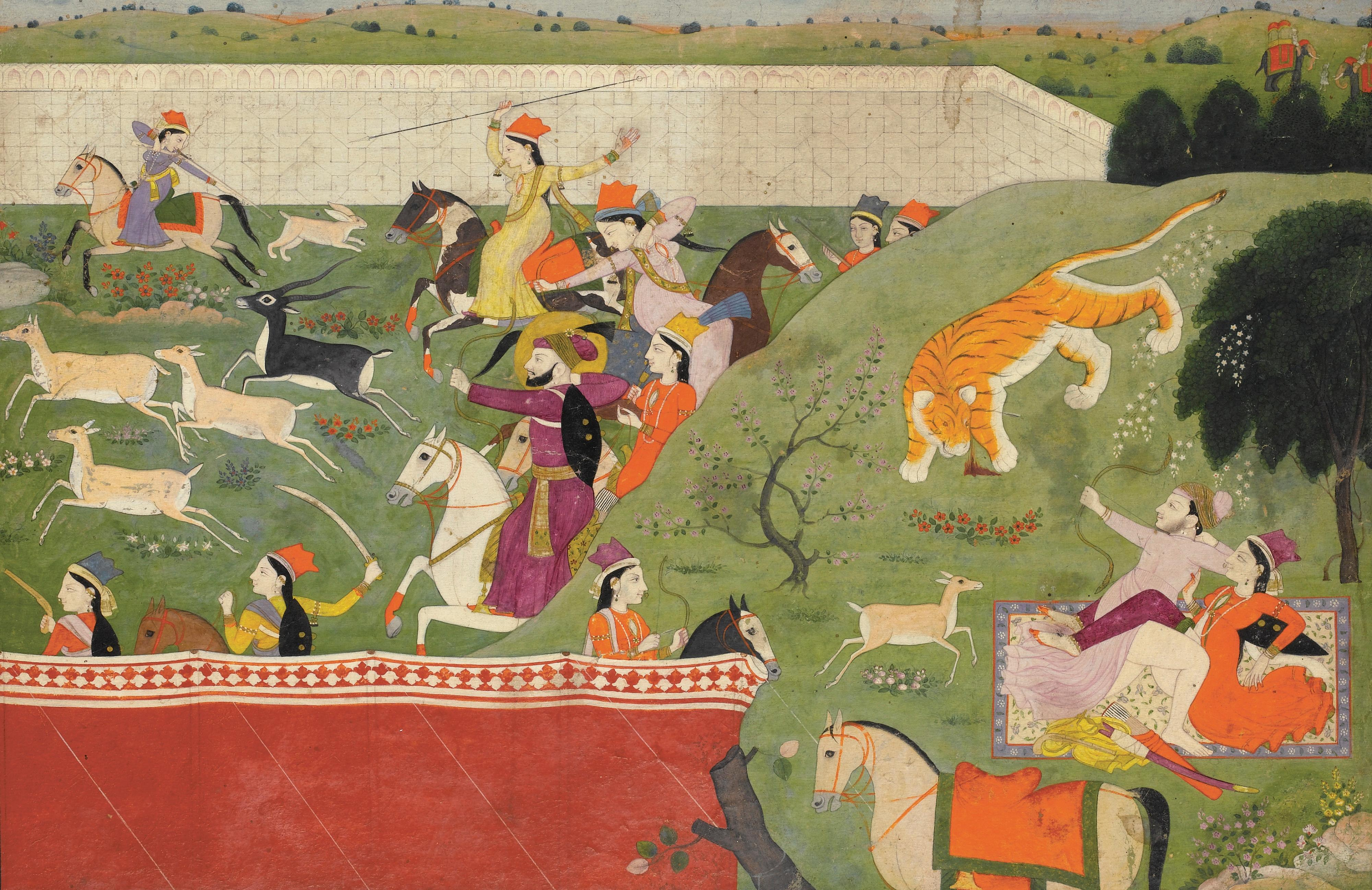
'Ala'ud-Din and Mahima Dharma hunting a tiger while in an intimate relationship, Punjab Hills, India, 1790

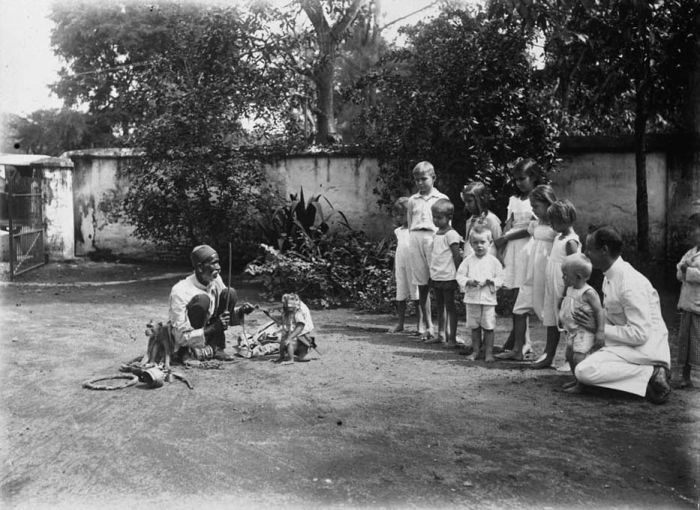
Trained monkey performing for an audience of children (1900–20)

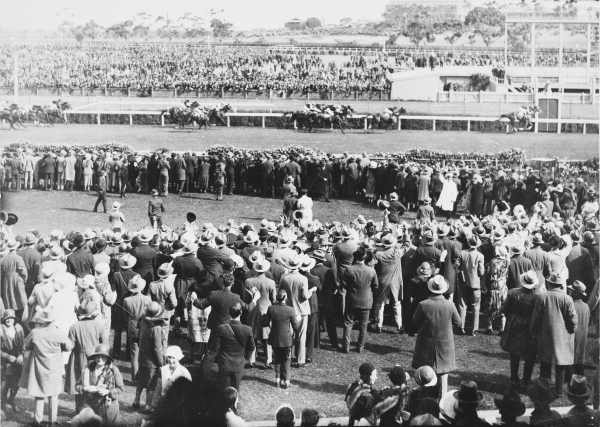
Crowd watches Phar Lap win the Melbourne Cup in Australia, 1930.

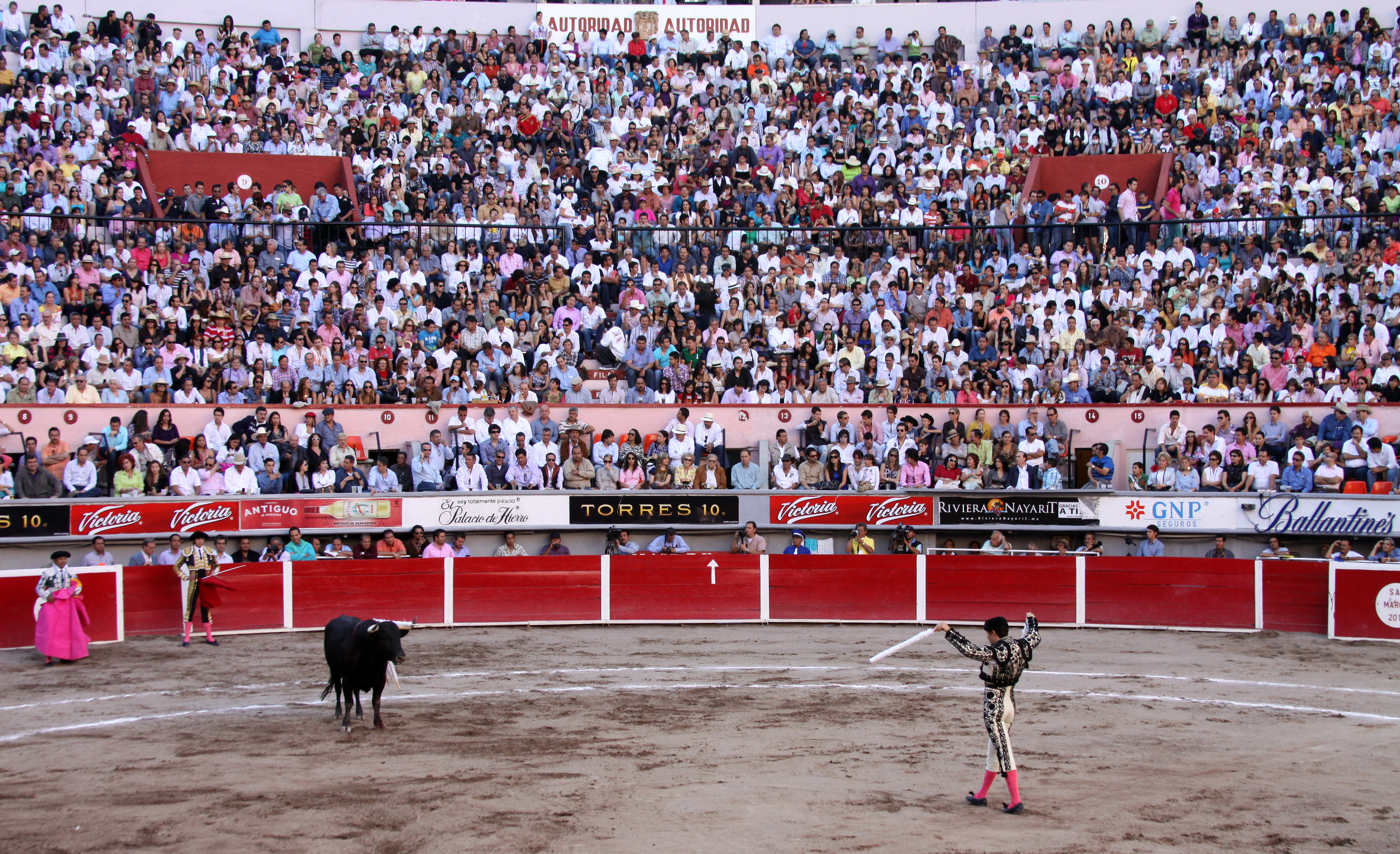
Crowd watches a bullfight in Mexico, 2010.

==== Circus ====
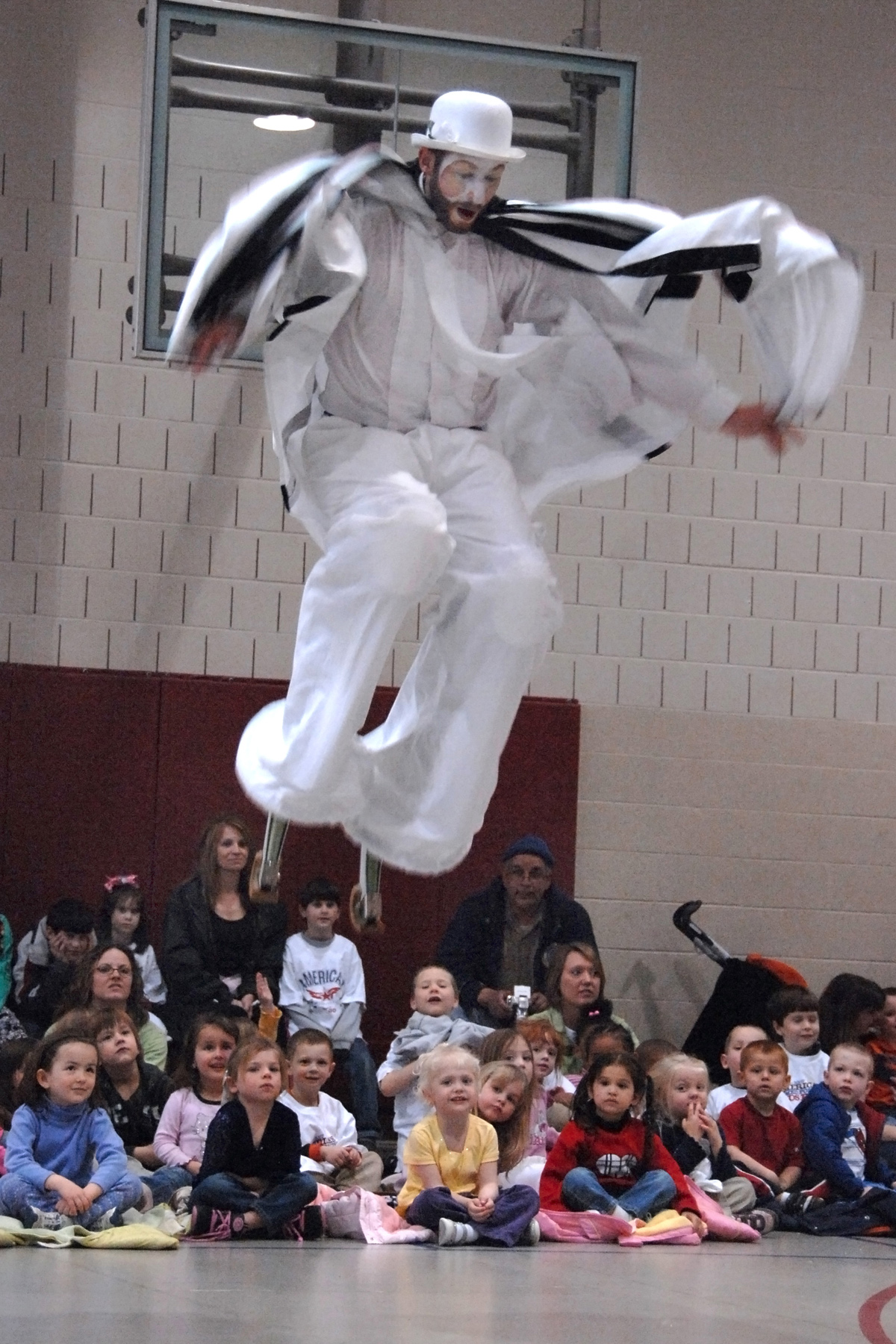
Children entertained by a stilt walker performing in a circus act

A circus, described as "one of the most brazen of entertainment forms", is a special type of theatrical performance, involving a variety of physical skills such as acrobatics and juggling and sometimes performing animals. Usually thought of as a travelling show performed in a big top, the circus was first performed in permanent venues. Philip Astley is regarded as the founder of the modern circus in the second half of the 18th century, and Jules Léotard is the French performer credited with developing the art of the trapeze, considered synonymous with circuses. Astley brought together performances that were generally familiar in traditional British fairs "at least since the beginning of the 17th century": "tumbling, rope-dancing, juggling, animal tricks and so on". It has been claimed that

there is no direct link between the Roman circus and the circus of modern times. ... Between the demise of the Roman 'circus' and the foundation of Astley's Amphitheatre in London some 1300 years later, the nearest thing to a circus ring was the rough circle formed by the curious onlookers who gathered around the itinerant tumbler or juggler on a village green.

==== Magic ====
The form of entertainment known as stage magic or conjuring, and recognisable as performance, is based on traditions and texts of magical rites and dogmas that have been a part of most cultural traditions since ancient times. (References to magic, for example, can be found in the Bible, in Hermeticism, in Zoroastrianism, in the Kabbalistic tradition, in mysticism and in the sources of Freemasonry.)

Stage magic is performed for an audience in a variety of media and locations: on stage, on television, in the street, and live at parties or events. It is often combined with other forms of entertainment, such as comedy or music, and showmanship is often an essential part of magic performances. Performance magic relies on deception, psychological manipulation, sleight of hand and other forms of trickery to give an audience the illusion that a performer can achieve the impossible. Audiences amazed at the stunt performances and escape acts of Harry Houdini, for example, regarded him as a magician.

Fantasy magicians have held an important place in literature for centuries, offering entertainment to millions of readers. Famous wizards such as Merlin in the Arthurian legends have been written about since the 5th and 6th centuries, while in the 21st century, the young wizard Harry Potter became a global entertainment phenomenon when the book series about him sold about 450 million copies (as at June 2011), making it the best-selling book series in history.

==== Street performance ====
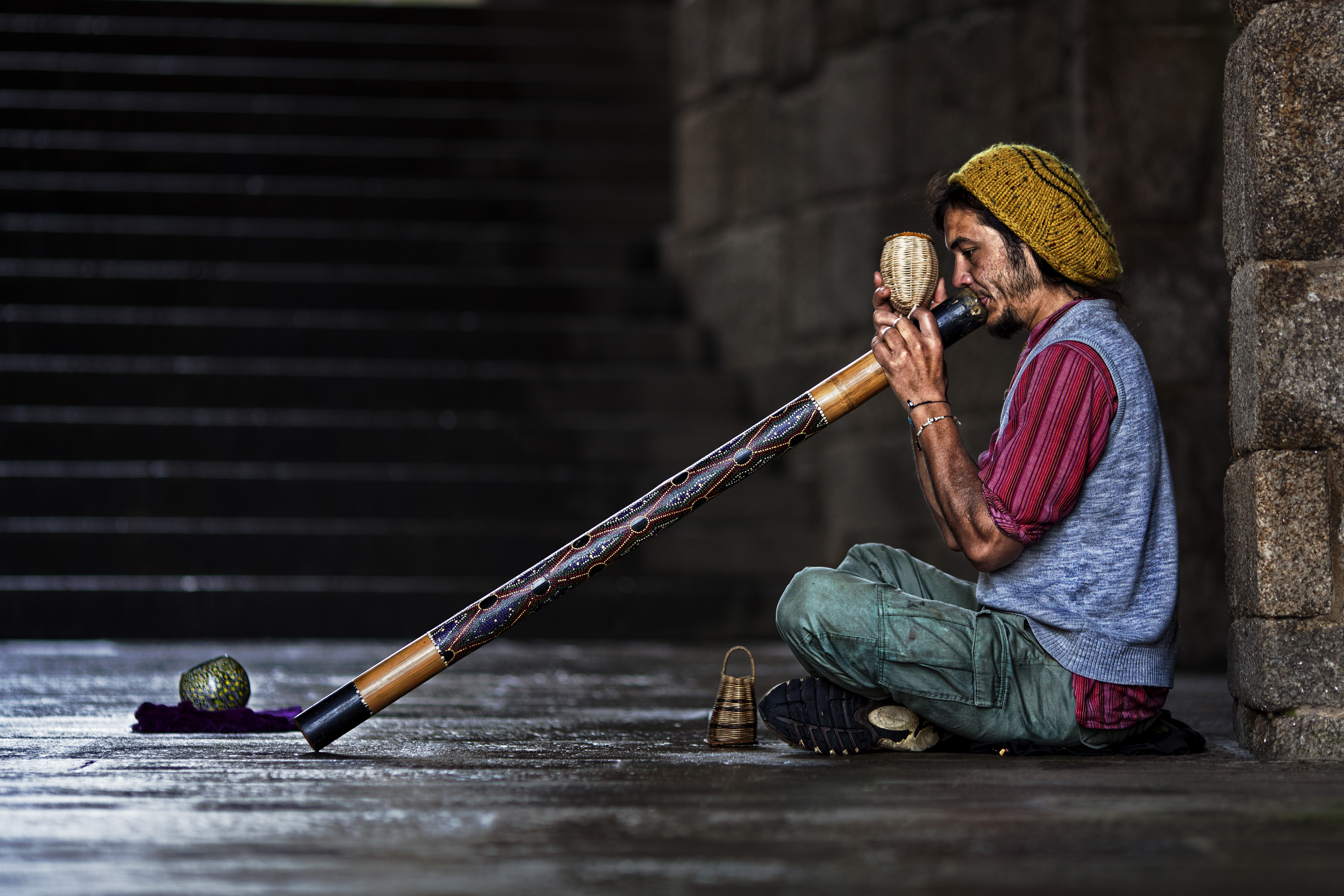
Didgeridoo player entertaining passers-by in the street

Street entertainment, street performance, or "busking" are forms of performance that have been meeting the public's need for entertainment for centuries. It was "an integral aspect of London's life", for example, when the city in the early 19th century was "filled with spectacle and diversion". Minstrels or troubadours are part of the tradition. The art and practice of busking is still celebrated at annual busking festivals.

There are three basic forms of contemporary street performance. The first form is the "circle show". It tends to gather a crowd, usually has a distinct beginning and end, and is done in conjunction with street theatre, puppeteering, magicians, comedians, acrobats, jugglers and sometimes musicians. This type has the potential to be the most lucrative for the performer because there are likely to be more donations from larger audiences if they are entertained by the act. Good buskers control the crowd so patrons do not obstruct foot traffic. The second form, the walk-by act, has no distinct beginning or end. Typically, the busker provides an entertaining ambience, often with an unusual instrument, and the audience may not stop to watch or form a crowd. Sometimes a walk-by act spontaneously turns into a circle show. The third form, café busking, is performed mostly in restaurants, pubs, bars and cafés. This type of act occasionally uses public transport as a venue.

==== Parades ====
Parades are held for a range of purposes, often more than one. Whether their mood is sombre or festive, being public events that are designed to attract attention and activities that necessarily divert normal traffic, parades have a clear entertainment value to their audiences. Cavalcades and the modern variant, the motorcade, are examples of public processions. Some people watching the parade or procession may have made a special effort to attend, while others become part of the audience by happenstance. Whatever their mood or primary purpose, parades attract and entertain people who watch them pass by. Occasionally, a parade takes place in an improvised theatre space (such as Trooping the Colour in), and tickets are sold to the physical audience while the global audience participates via broadcast.

One of the earliest forms of parade was a triumph – a grand and sensational display of foreign treasures and spoils, given by triumphant Roman generals to celebrate their victories. Triumphs presented conquered peoples and nations that exalted the prestige of the victor. "In the summer of 46 BCE Julius Caesar chose to celebrate four triumphs held on different days extending for about one month." In Europe from the Middle Ages to the Baroque, the Royal Entry celebrated the formal visit of the monarch to the city with a parade through elaborately decorated streets, passing various shows and displays. The annual Lord Mayor's Show in London is an example of a civic parade that has survived since medieval times.

Many religious festivals (especially those that incorporate processions, such as Holy Week processions or the Indian festival of Holi) have some entertainment appeal in addition to their serious purpose. Sometimes, religious rituals have been adapted or evolved into secular entertainments, or, like the Festa del Redentore in Venice, have managed to grow in popularity while holding both secular and sacred purposes in balance. However, pilgrimages, such as the Roman Catholic pilgrimage of the Way of St. James, the Muslim Hajj and the Hindu Kumbh Mela, which may appear to the outsider as an entertaining parade or procession, are not intended as entertainment: they are instead about an individual's spiritual journey. Hence, the relationship between spectator and participant, unlike entertainments proper, is different. The manner in which the Kumbh Mela, for example, "is divorced from its cultural context and repackaged for Western consumption – renders the presence of voyeurs deeply problematic."

Parades generally impress and delight often by including unusual, colourful costumes. Sometimes they also commemorate or celebrate. Sometimes they have a serious purpose, such as when the context is military, when the intention is sometimes to intimidate; or religious, when the audience might participate or have a role to play. Even if a parade uses new technology and is some distance away, it is likely to have a strong appeal, draw the attention of onlookers and entertain them.

Parades across cultures

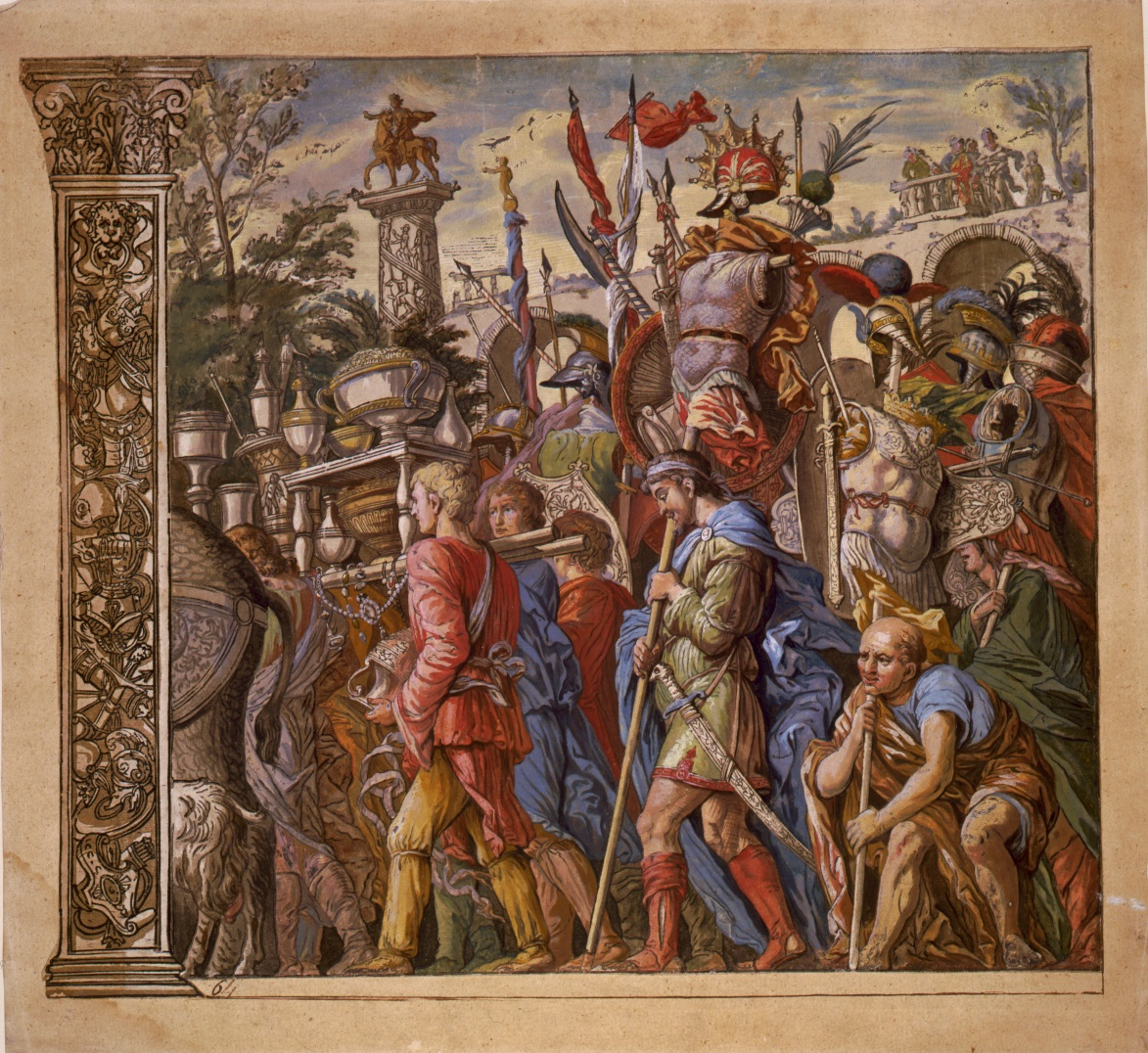
Triumph of Caesar, Andreani (1588/9)

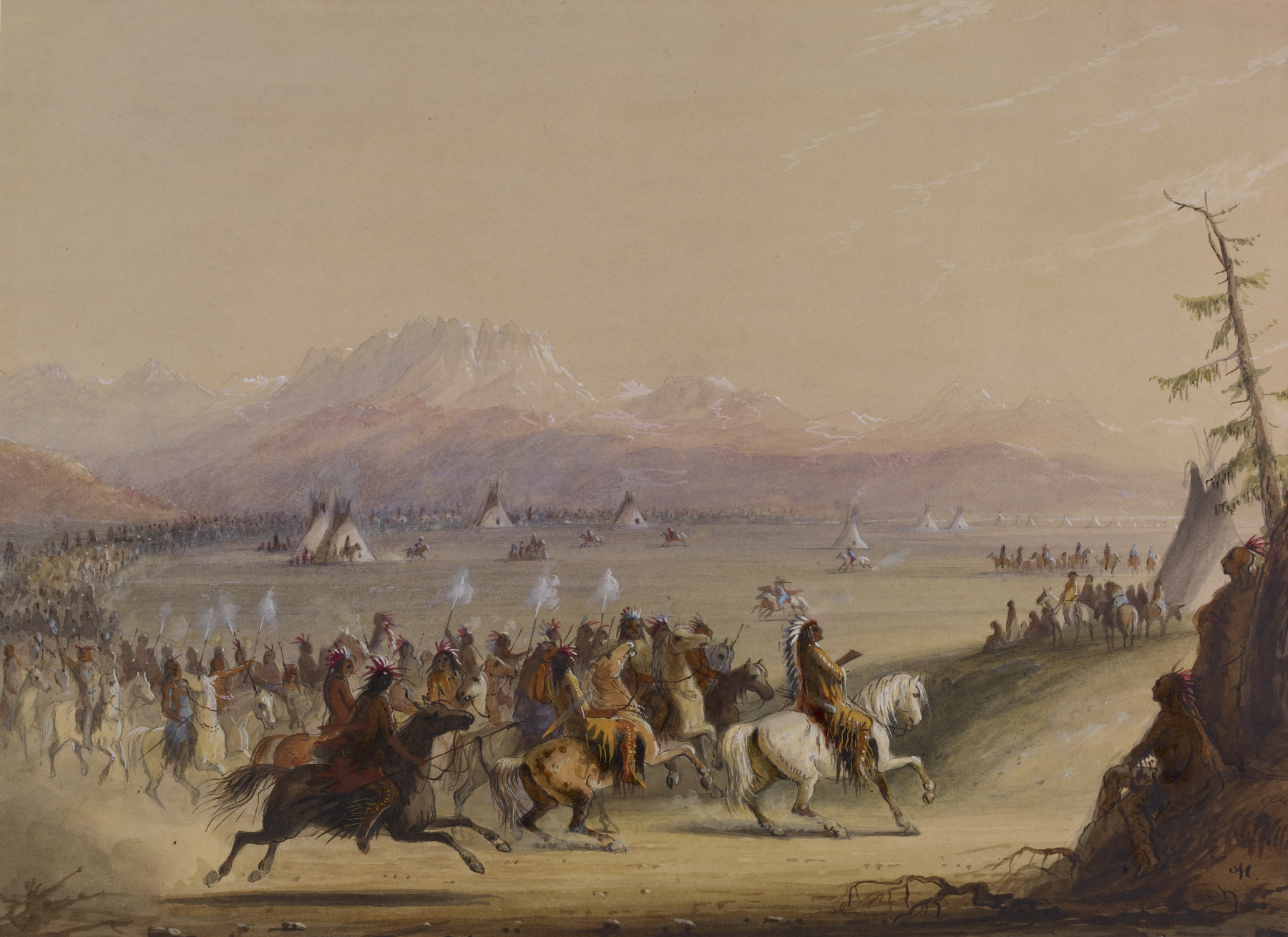
Alfred Jacob Miller Cavalcade by the Snake Indians (1858–60)

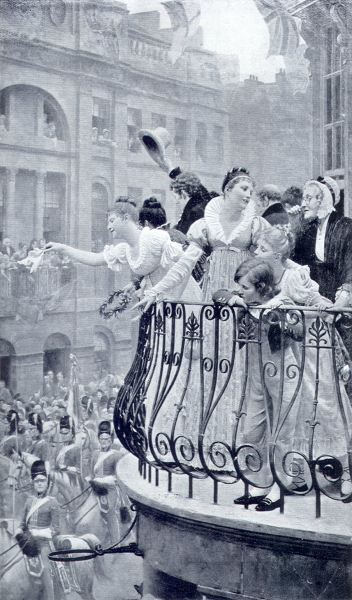
Parade from the onlooker perspective (1816)

Inauguration parade of US President McKinley (1897)

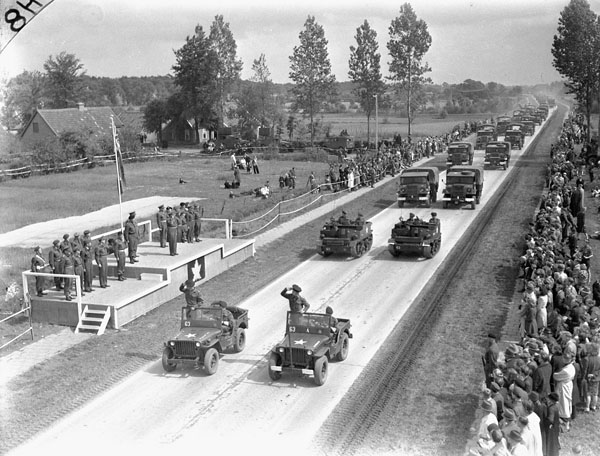
Respectful crowd at motorcade in Canada (1945)

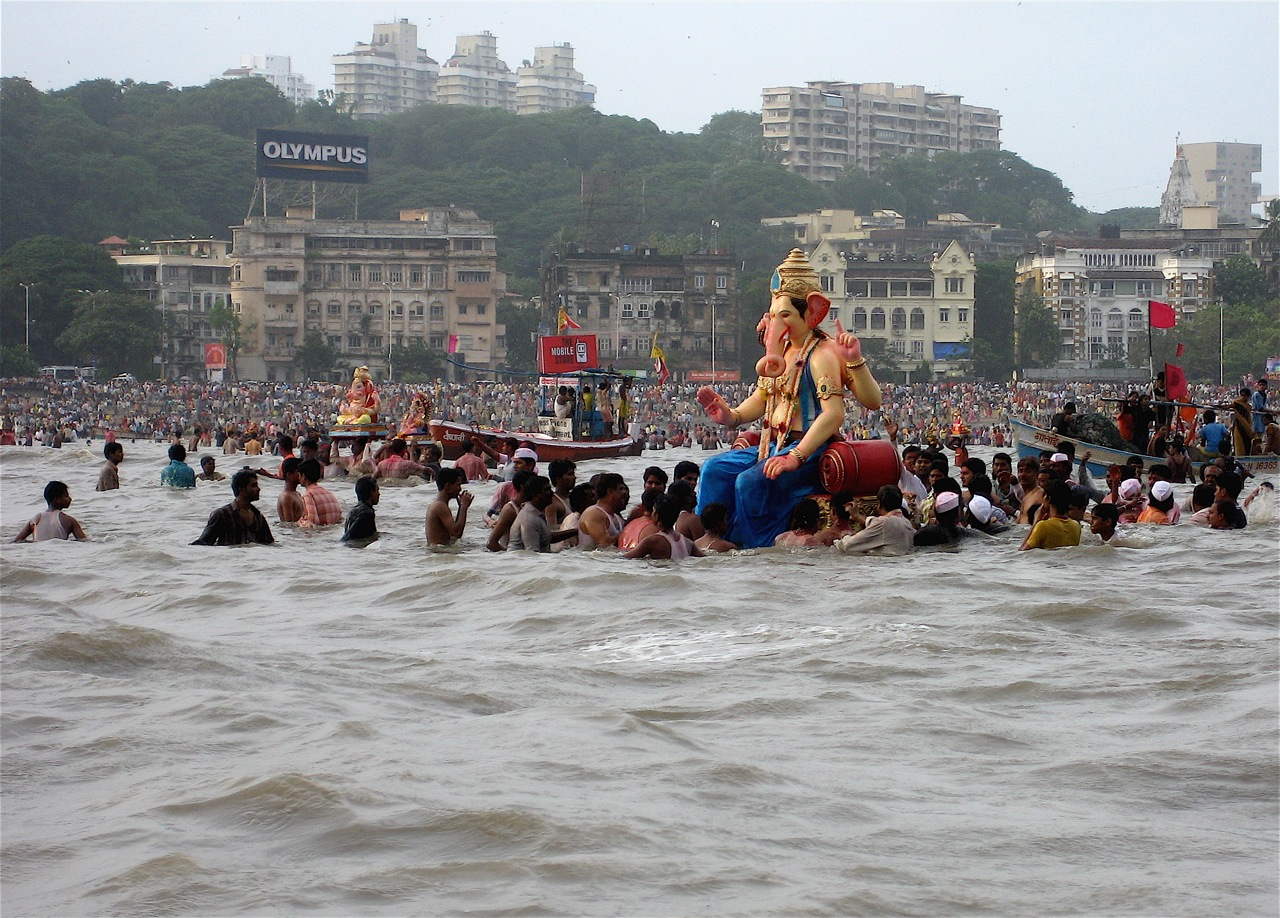
Ganesh Visarjan, Mumbai (2007)

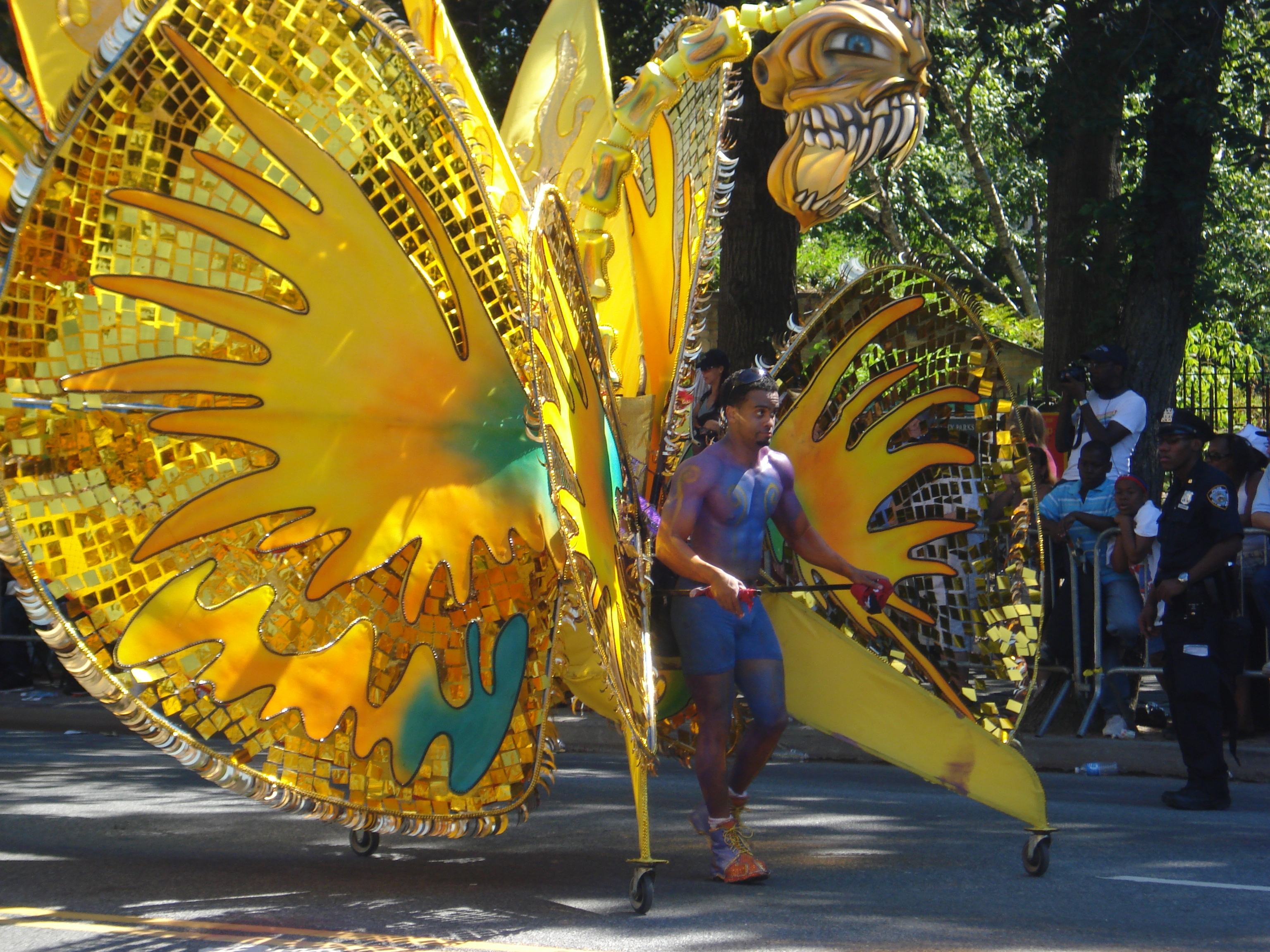
Costumes in West Indian Day parade (2008)

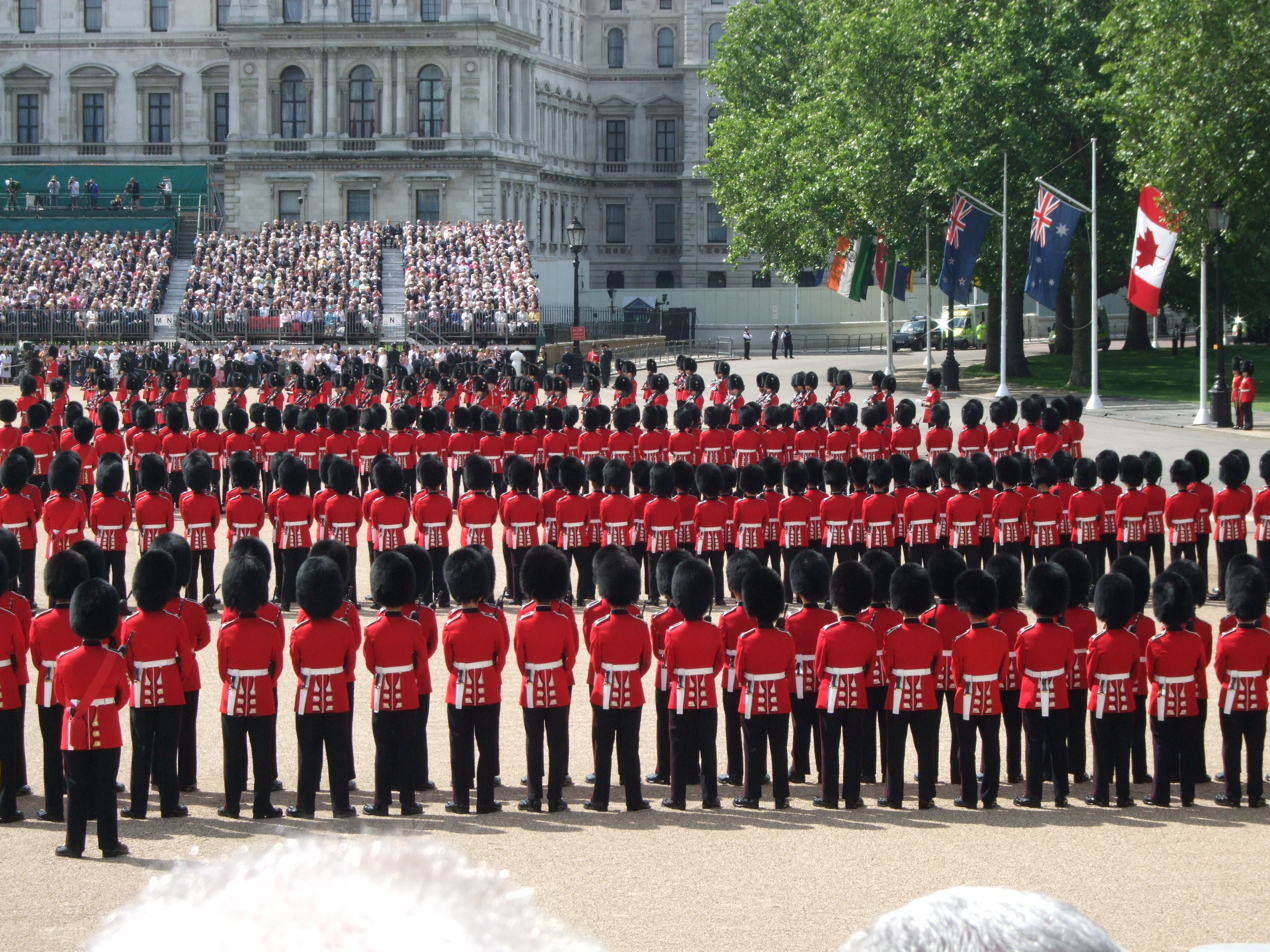
Celebratory parade in London before seated audience (2008)

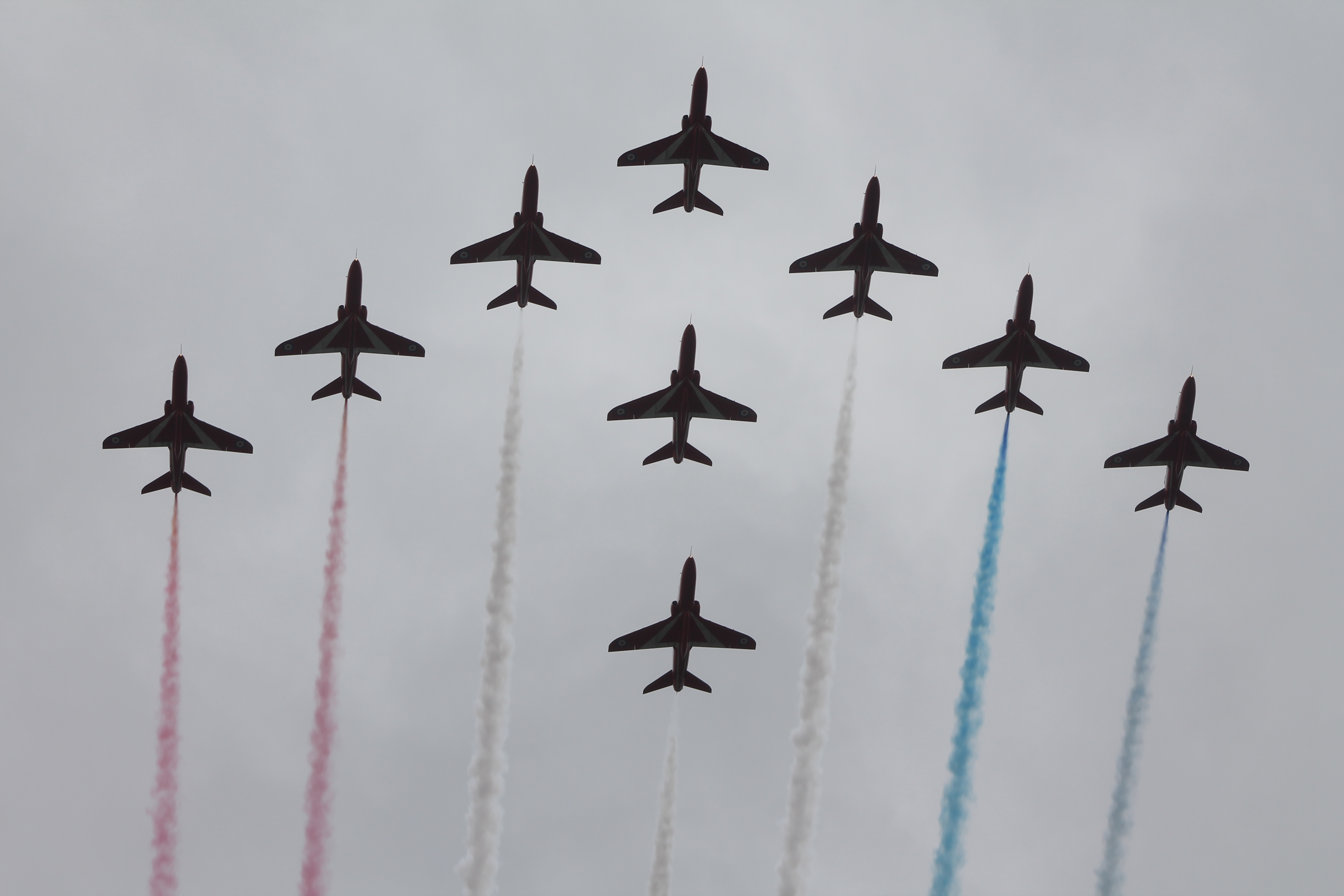
Flypast (2012)

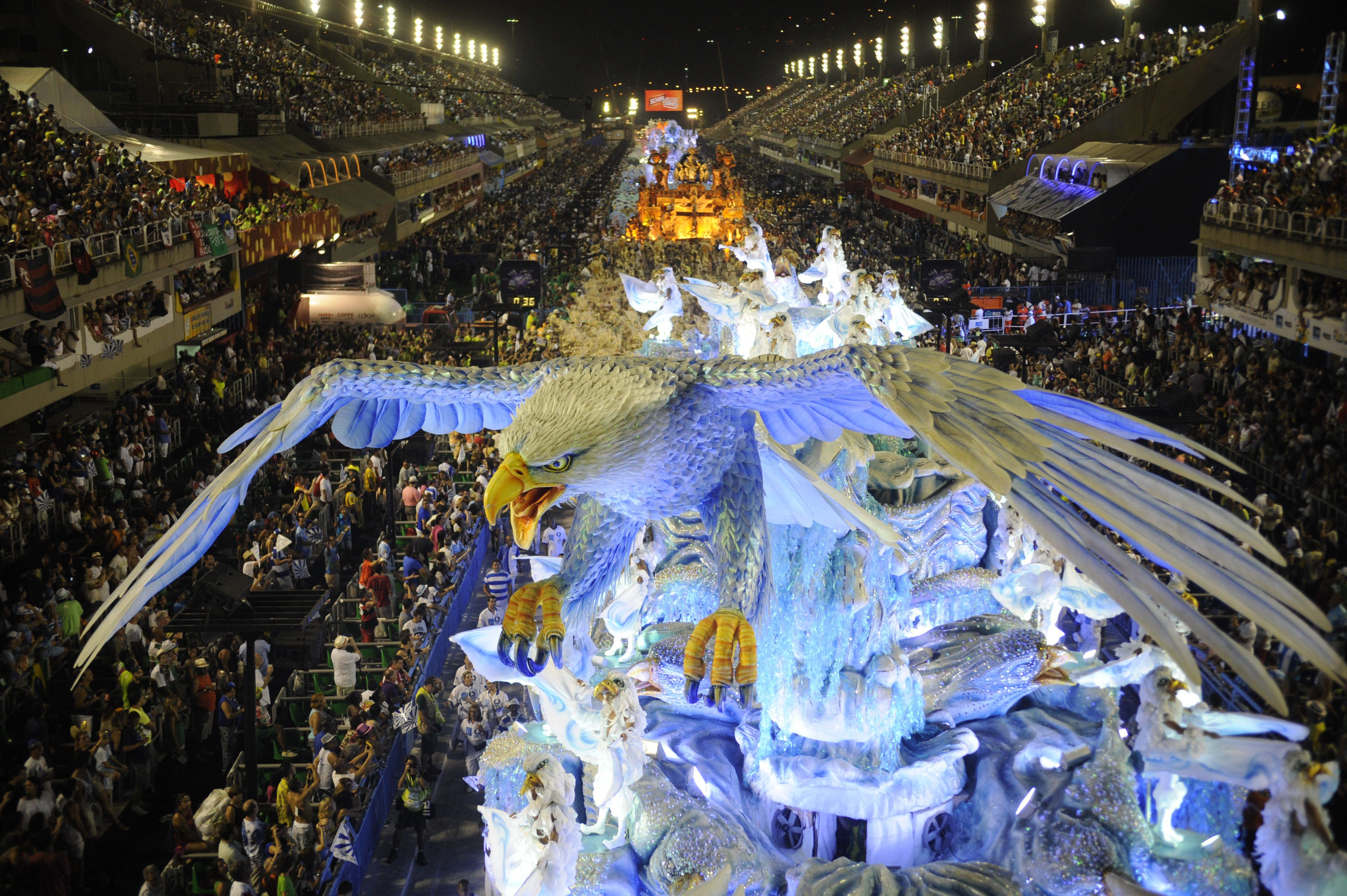
Festive parade in Brazil (2014)

==== Fireworks ====
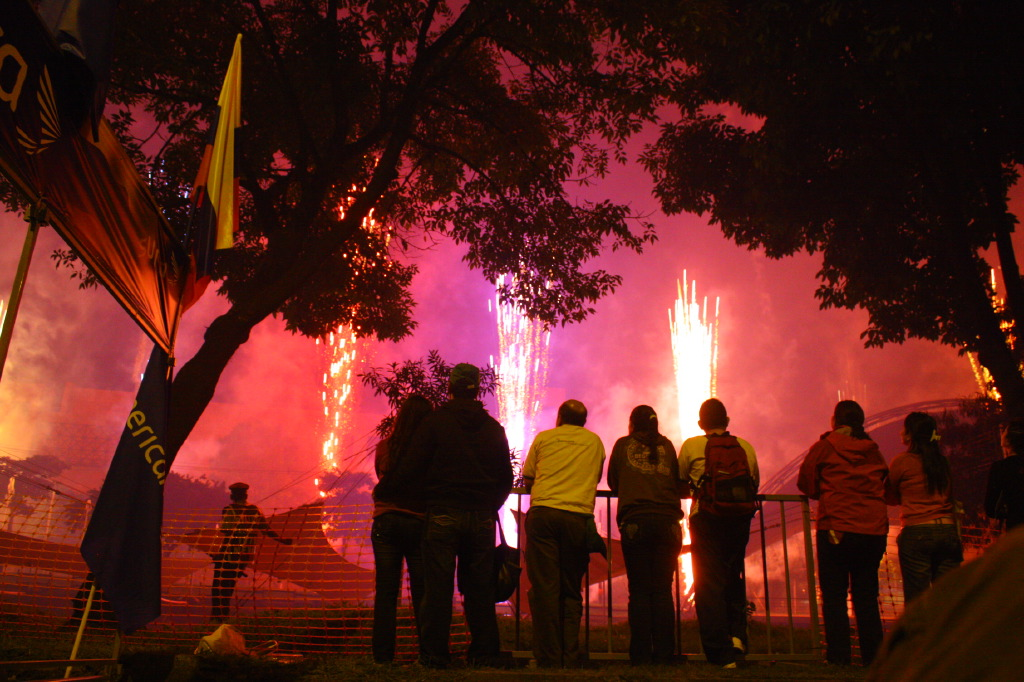
Spectators at Bicentennial fireworks in Colombia

Fireworks are a part of many public entertainments and have retained an enduring popularity since they became a "crowning feature of elaborate celebrations" in the 17th century. First used in China, classical antiquity and Europe for military purposes, fireworks were most popular in the 18th century, and high prices were paid for pyrotechnists, especially the skilled Italian ones, who were summoned to other countries to organise displays. Fire and water were important aspects of court spectacles because the displays

inspired by means of fire, sudden noise, smoke and general magnificence the sentiments thought fitting for the subject to entertain of his sovereign: awe fear and a vicarious sense of glory in his might. Birthdays, name-days, weddings and anniversaries provided the occasion for celebration.

One of the most famous courtly uses of fireworks was one used to celebrate the end of the War of the Austrian Succession; while the fireworks themselves caused a fire, the accompanying Music for the Royal Fireworks written by Handel has been popular ever since. Aside from their contribution to entertainments related to military successes, courtly displays and personal celebrations, fireworks are also used as part of religious ceremony. For example, during the Indian Dashavatara Kala of Gomantaka, "the temple deity is taken around in a procession with a lot of singing, dancing and display of fireworks".

The "fire, sudden noise and smoke" of fireworks is still a significant part of public celebration and entertainment. For example, fireworks were one of the primary forms of display chosen to celebrate the turn of the millennium around the world. As the clock struck midnight and 1999 became 2000, firework displays and open-air parties greeted the New Year as the time zones changed over to the next century. Fireworks, carefully planned and choreographed, were let off against the backdrop of many of the world's most famous buildings, including the Sydney Harbour Bridge, the Pyramids of Giza in Egypt, the Acropolis in Athens, Red Square in Moscow, Vatican City in Rome, the Brandenburg Gate in Berlin, the Eiffel Tower in Paris, and the Elizabeth Tower in London.

=== Sport ===
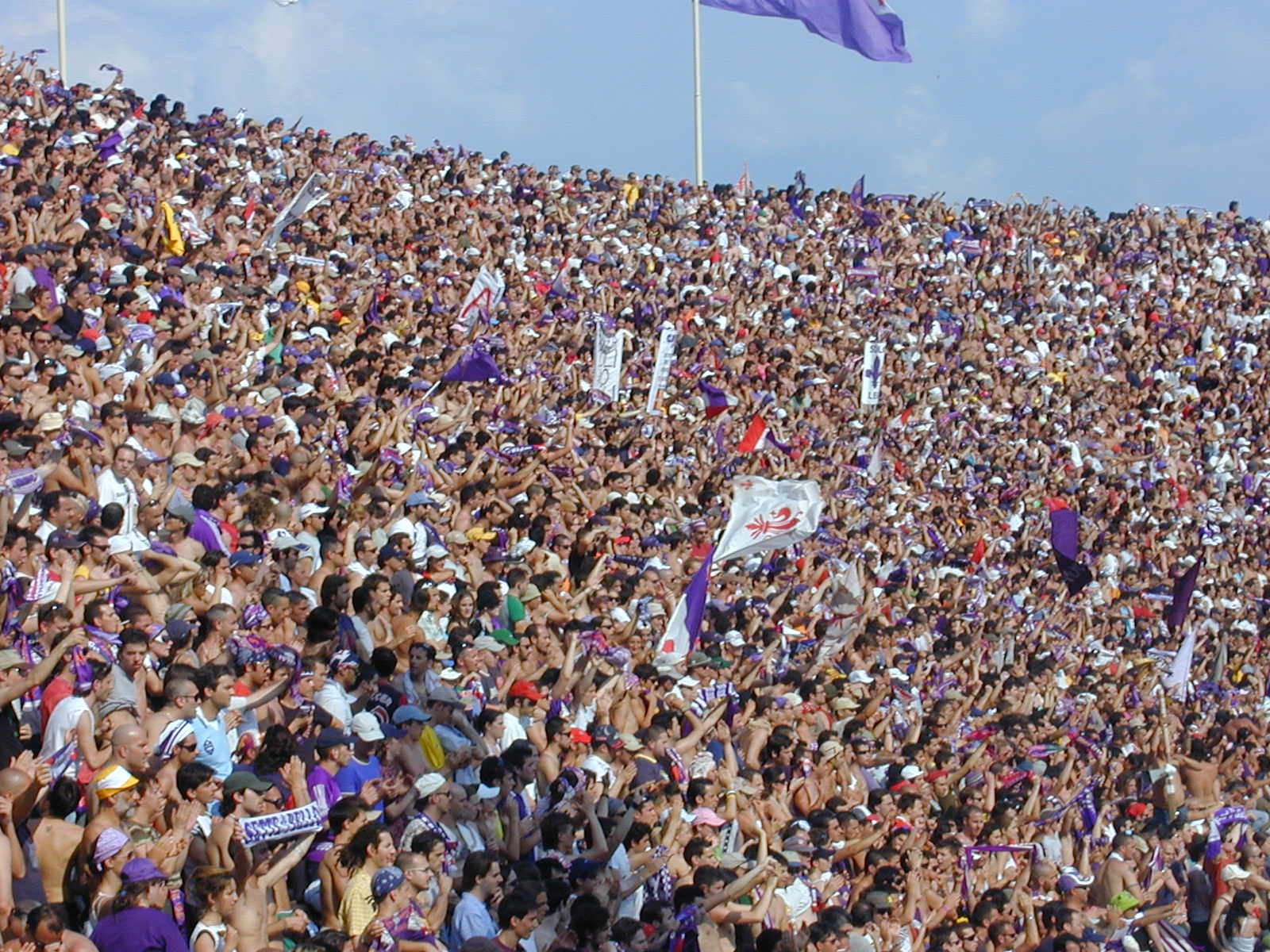
Audience engagement from a crowd of Italian sport fans

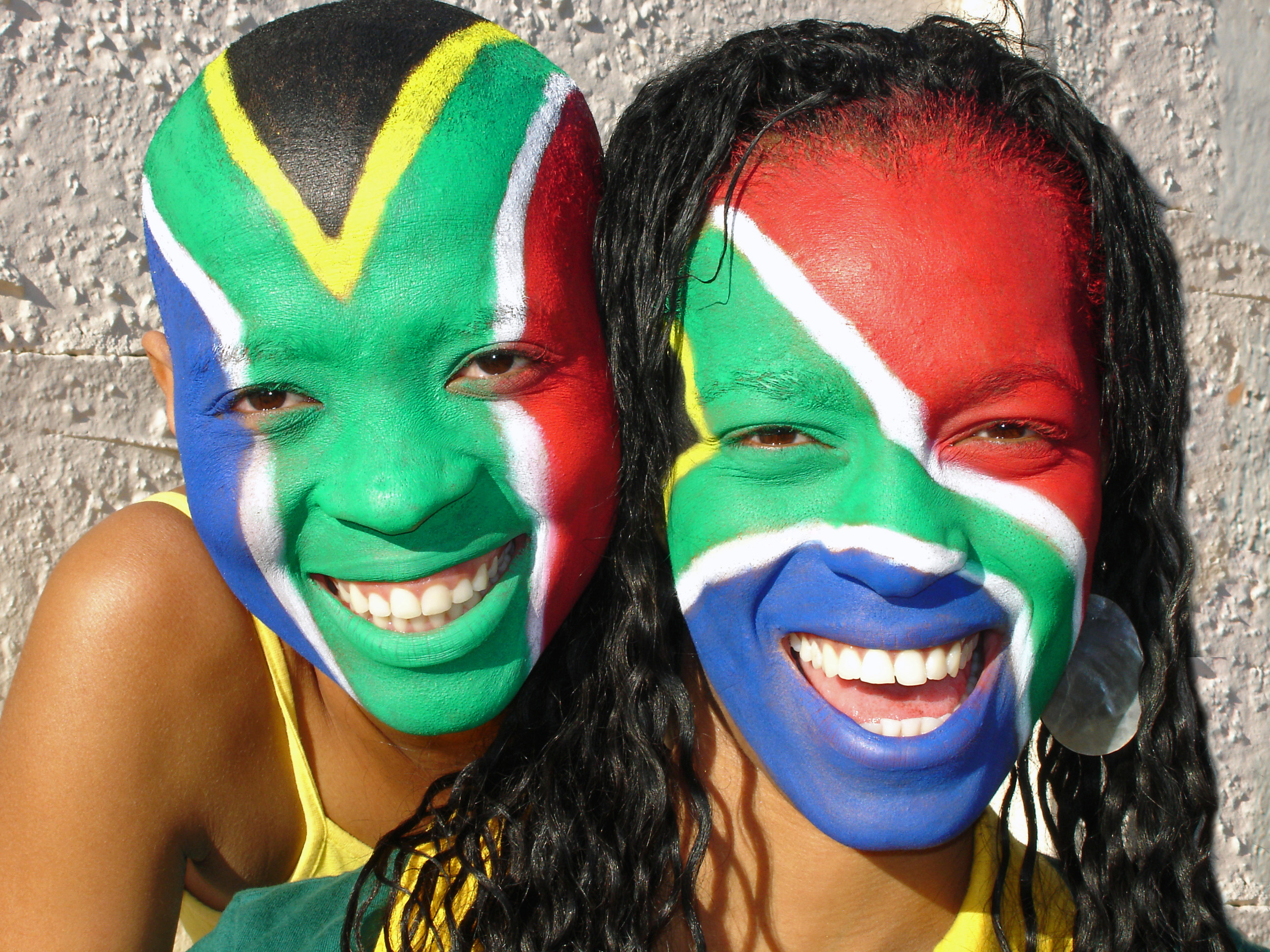
Audience engagement by individual South African fans at the 2010 FIFA World Cup

Sporting competitions have always provided entertainment for crowds. To distinguish the players from the audience, the latter are often known as spectators. Developments in stadium and auditorium design, as well as in recording and broadcast technology, have allowed off-site spectators to watch sport, with the result that the size of the audience has grown ever larger and spectator sport has become increasingly popular. Two of the most popular sports with global appeal are association football and cricket. Their ultimate international competitions, the FIFA World Cup and the Cricket World Cup, are broadcast around the world. Beyond the very large numbers involved in playing these sports, they are notable for being a major source of entertainment for many millions of non-players worldwide. A comparable multi-stage, long-form sport with global appeal is the Tour de France, unusual in that it takes place outside of special stadia, being run instead in the countryside.

Aside from sports that have worldwide appeal and competitions, such as the Olympic Games, the entertainment value of a sport depends on the culture and country where people play it. For example, in the United States, baseball and basketball games are popular forms of entertainment; in Bhutan, the national sport is archery; in New Zealand, it is rugby union; in Iran, it is freestyle wrestling. Japan's unique sumo wrestling contains ritual elements that derive from its long history. In some cases, such as the international running group Hash House Harriers, participants create a blend of sport and entertainment for themselves, largely independent of spectator involvement, where the social component is more important than the competitive.

The evolution of an activity into a sport and then an entertainment is also affected by the local climate and conditions. For example, the modern sport of surfing is associated with Hawaii, and that of snow skiing probably evolved in Scandinavia. While these sports and the entertainment they offer to spectators have spread around the world, people in the two originating countries remain well known for their prowess. Sometimes the climate offers a chance to adapt another sport, such as in the case of ice hockey – an important entertainment in Canada.

=== Fairs, expositions, shopping ===
Fairs and exhibitions have existed since ancient and medieval times, displaying wealth, innovations and objects for trade and offering specific entertainments as well as being places of entertainment in themselves. Whether in a medieval market or a small shop, "shopping always offered forms of exhilaration that took one away from the everyday". However, in the modern world, "merchandising has become entertainment: spinning signs, flashing signs, thumping music ... video screens, interactive computer kiosks, day care ... cafés".

By the 19th century, "expos" that encouraged arts, manufactures and commerce had become international. They were not only hugely popular but affected international ideas. For example, the 1878 Paris Exposition facilitated international cooperation about ideas, innovations and standards. From London 1851 to Paris 1900, "in excess of 200 million visitors had entered the turnstiles in London, Paris, Vienna, Philadelphia, Chicago and a myriad of smaller shows around the world." Since World War II, "well over 500 million visits have been recorded through world expo turnstiles". As a form of spectacle and entertainment, expositions influenced "everything from architecture, to patterns of globalisation, to fundamental matters of human identity"; in the process, expositions established the close relationship between "fairs, the rise of department stores and art museums", the modern world of mass consumption and the entertainment industry.

Entertainment in expositions and shops

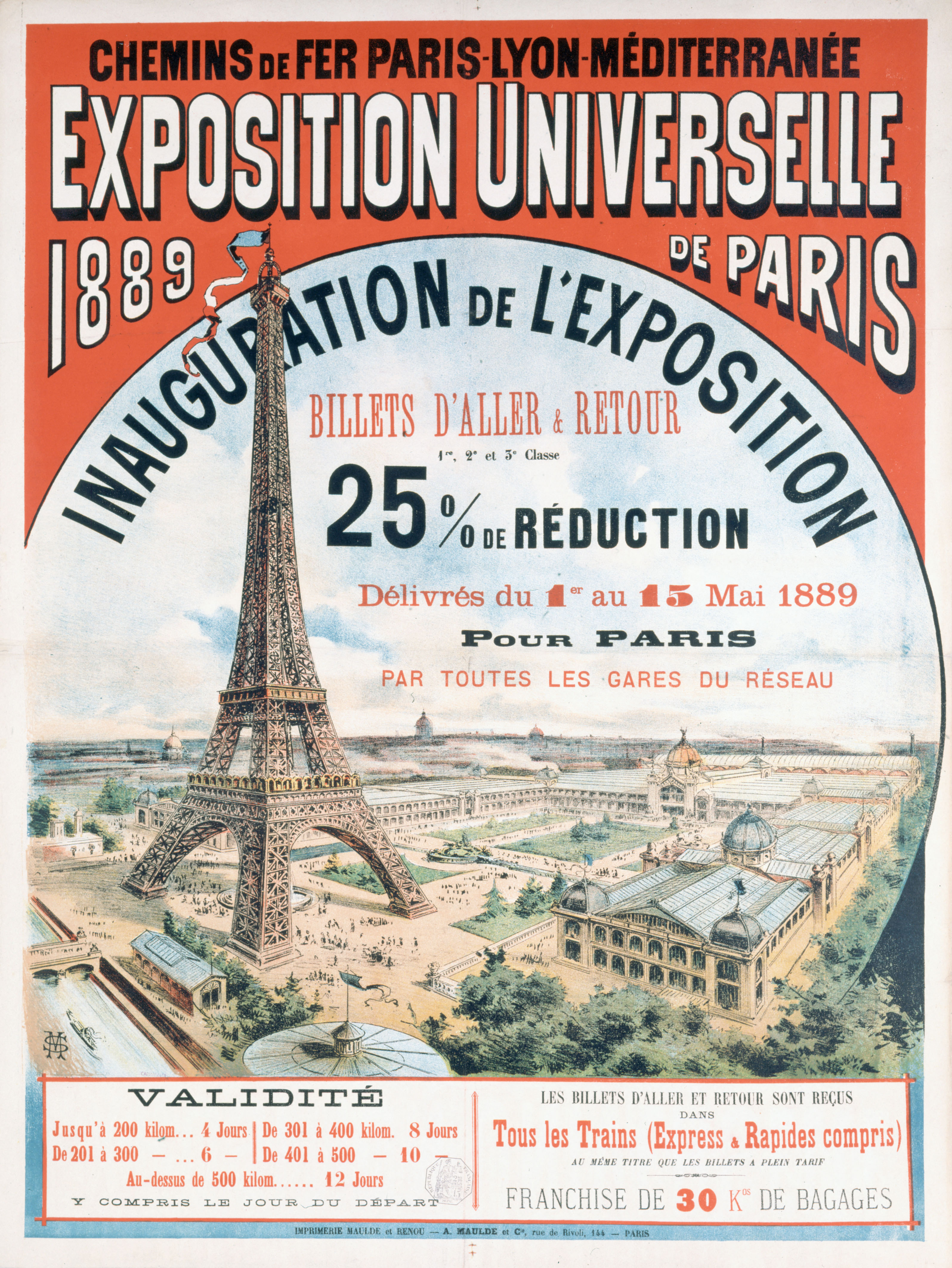
Advertisement for 1889 Paris Universal Exposition

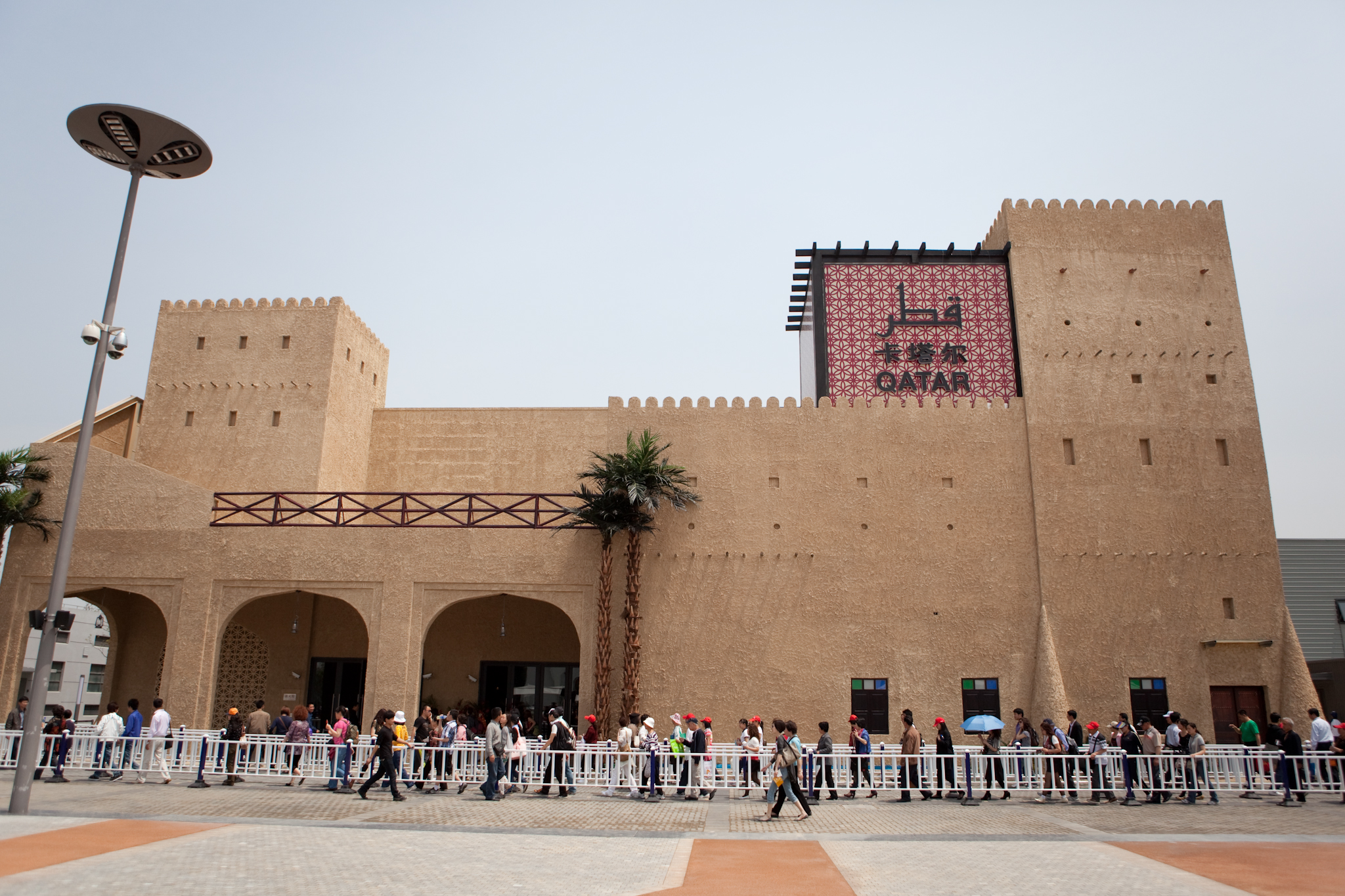
Audience queuing for Qatar's World Exposition Pavilion at the 2010 Shanghai World Expo

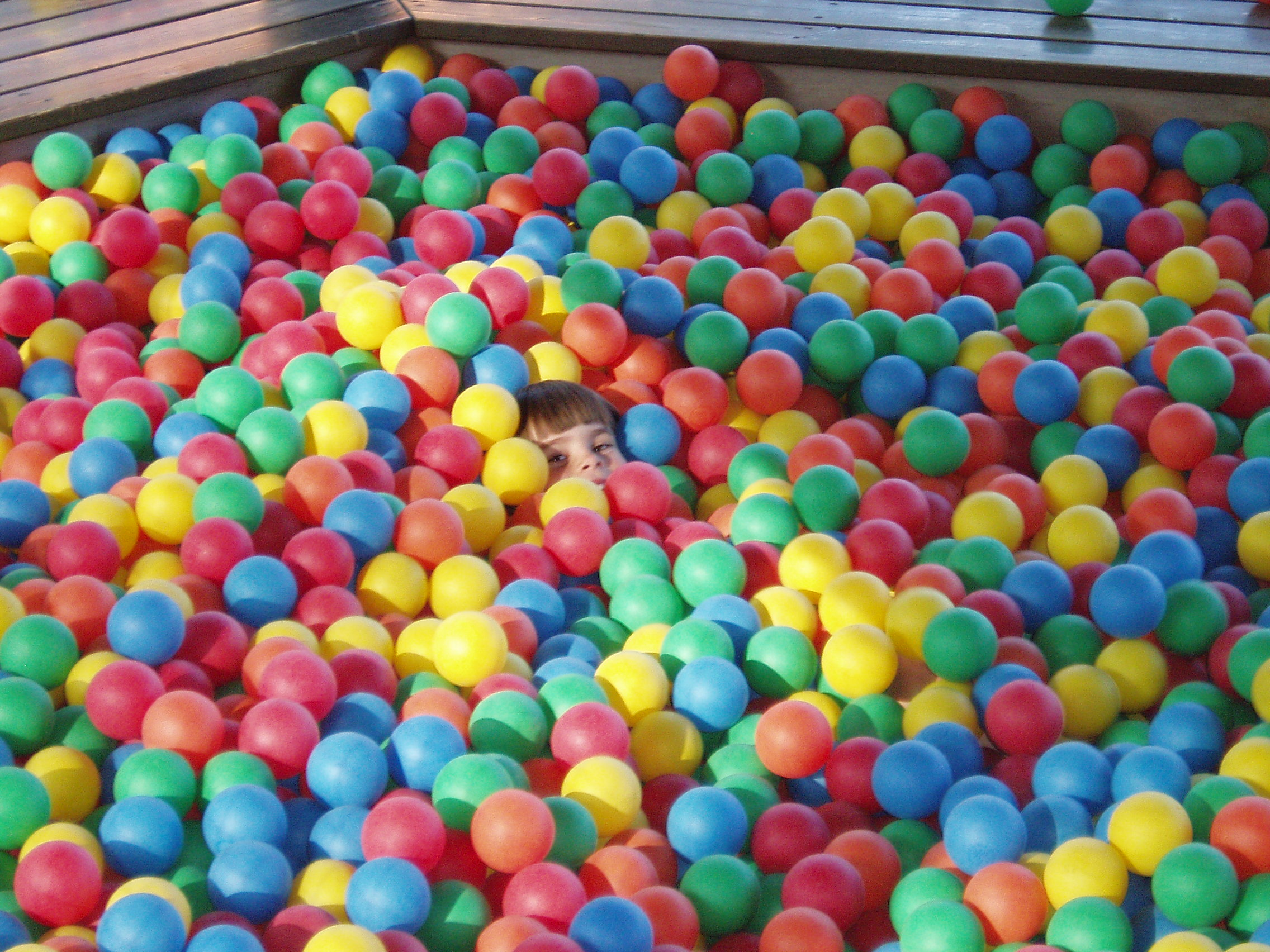
Ball pit of the type provided for children's entertainment in shopping malls

== Safety ==
Some entertainments, such as at large festivals (whether religious or secular), concerts, clubs, parties and celebrations, involve big crowds. From earliest times, crowds at an entertainment have been associated with hazards and dangers, especially when combined with the recreational consumption of intoxicants such as alcohol. The Ancient Greeks had Dionysian Mysteries, for example, and the Romans had Saturnalia. The consequence of excess and crowds can produce breaches of social norms of behaviour, sometimes causing injury or even death, such as at the Altamont Free Concert, an outdoor rock festival. The list of serious incidents at nightclubs includes those caused by crowd crush; terrorism, such as the 2002 Bali bombings that targeted a nightclub; and especially fire. Investigations, such as that carried out in the US after The Station nightclub fire, often demonstrate that lessons learned "regarding fire safety in nightclubs" from earlier events such as the Cocoanut Grove fire do "not necessarily result in lasting effective change". Efforts to prevent such incidents include appointing special officers, such as the medieval Lord of Misrule or, in modern times, security officers who control access; and also ongoing improvement of relevant standards such as those for building safety. The tourism industry now regards safety and security at entertainment venues as an important management task.

== Industry ==
Entertainment is big business, especially in the United States, but ubiquitous in all cultures. Kings, rulers and powerful people have always been able to pay for entertainment to be provided for them, and in many cases they have paid for public entertainment; nevertheless, people generally have made their own entertainment or, when possible, attended a live performance. Technological developments in the 20th century, especially in the area of mass media, meant that entertainment could be produced independently of the audience, packaged and sold on a commercial basis by an entertainment industry. Sometimes referred to as show business, the industry relies on business models to produce, market, broadcast or otherwise distribute many of its traditional forms, including performances of all types. The industry became so sophisticated that its economics became a separate area of academic study.

The film industry is a part of the entertainment industry. Components of it include the Hollywood and Bollywood film industries, as well as the cinema of the United Kingdom and all the cinemas of Europe, including France, Germany, Spain, Italy and others. The sex industry is another component of the entertainment industry, applying the same forms and media (for example, film, books, dance and other performances) to the development, marketing and sale of sex products on a commercial basis.

Amusement parks entertain paying guests with rides, such as roller coasters, ridable miniature railways, water rides, and dark rides, as well as other events and associated attractions. The parks are built on a large area subdivided into themed areas named "lands". Sometimes the whole amusement park is based on one theme, such as the various SeaWorld parks that focus on the theme of sea life.

One of the consequences of the development of the entertainment industry has been the creation of new types of employment. While jobs such as writer, musician and composer exist as they always have, people doing this work are likely to be employed by a company rather than a patron as they once would have been. New jobs have appeared, such as gaffer or special effects supervisor in the film industry, and attendants in an amusement park.

Prestigious awards are given by the industry for excellence in the various types of entertainment. For example, there are awards for music, games (including video games), comics, theatre, television, film, dance and magical arts. Sporting awards are made for the results and skill, rather than for the entertainment value.

The entertainment industry

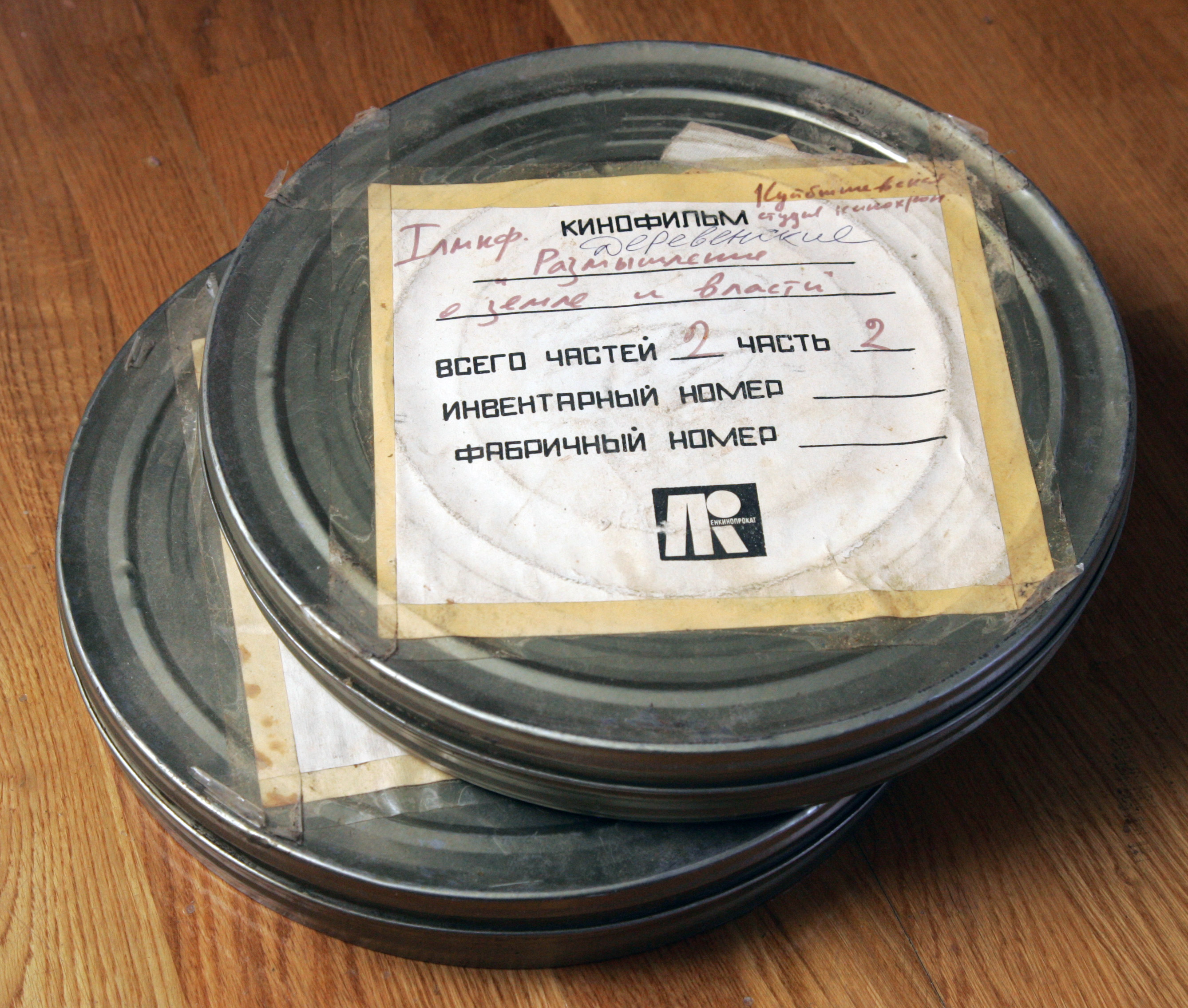
Packaged entertainment
35mm film reels in boxes

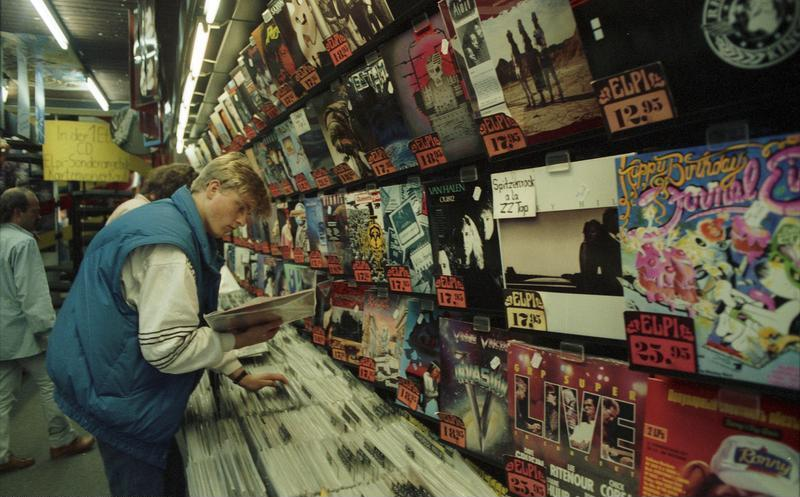
Choosing music from a record store (West Germany, 1988)

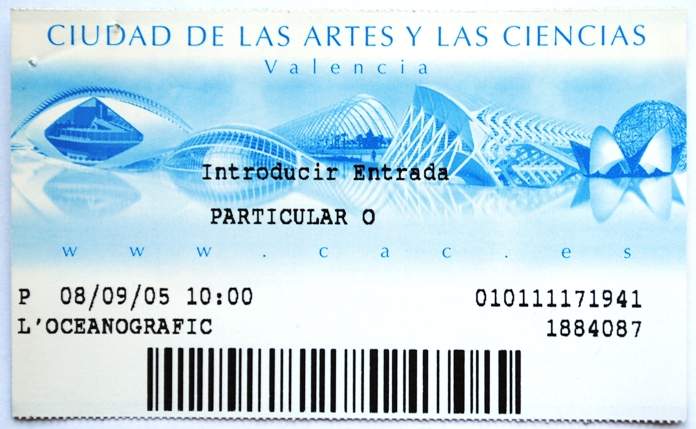
Ticket showing electronic barcode (Valencia, 2005)

== Architecture ==
=== Architecture for entertainment ===
Purpose-built structures as venues for entertainment that accommodate audiences have produced many famous and innovative buildings, among the most recognisable of which are theatre structures. For the ancient Greeks, "the architectural importance of the theatre is a reflection of their importance to the community, made apparent in their monumentality, in the effort put into their design, and in the care put into their detail." The Romans subsequently developed the stadium in an oval form known as a circus. In modern times, some of the grandest buildings for entertainment have brought fame to their cities as well as their designers. The Sydney Opera House, for example, is a World Heritage Site, and The O_{2} in London is an entertainment precinct that contains an indoor arena, a music club, a cinema and an exhibition space. The Bayreuth Festspielhaus in Germany is a theatre designed and built for performances of one specific musical composition.

Two of the chief architectural concerns for the design of venues for mass audiences are speed of egress and safety. The speed at which the venue empties is important both for amenity and safety, because large crowds take a long time to disperse from a badly designed venue, which creates a safety risk. The Hillsborough disaster is an example of how poor aspects of building design can contribute to audience deaths. Sightlines and acoustics are also important design considerations in most theatrical venues.

In the 21st century, entertainment venues, especially stadia, are "likely to figure among the leading architectural genres". However, they require "a whole new approach" to design, because they need to be "sophisticated entertainment centres, multi-experience venues, capable of being enjoyed in many diverse ways". Hence, architects now have to design "with two distinct functions in mind, as sports and entertainment centres playing host to live audiences, and as sports and entertainment studios serving the viewing and listening requirements of the remote audience".

Architecture for entertainment

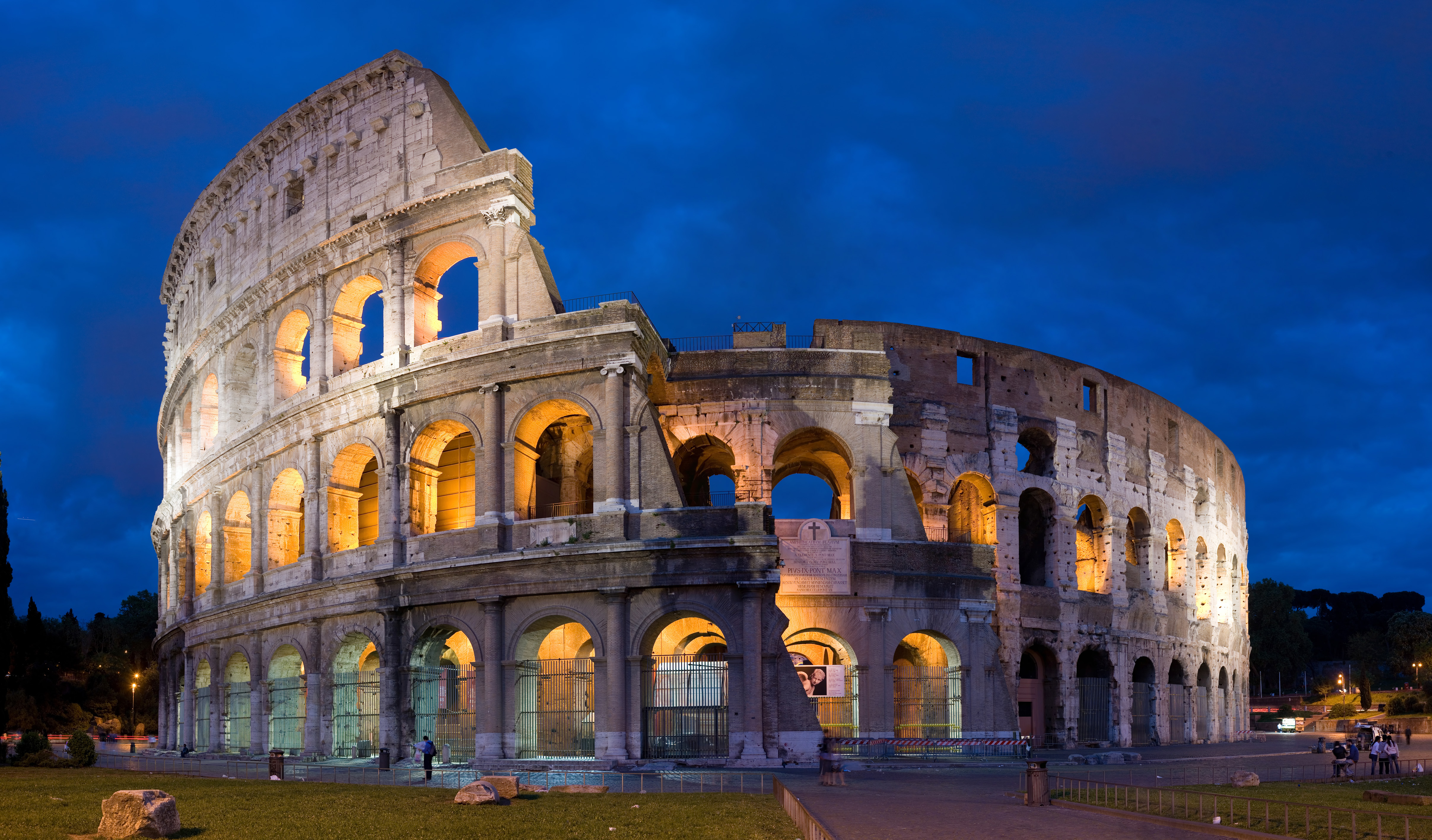
Colosseum, Rome (70–80 AD), Roman venue for mass entertainment

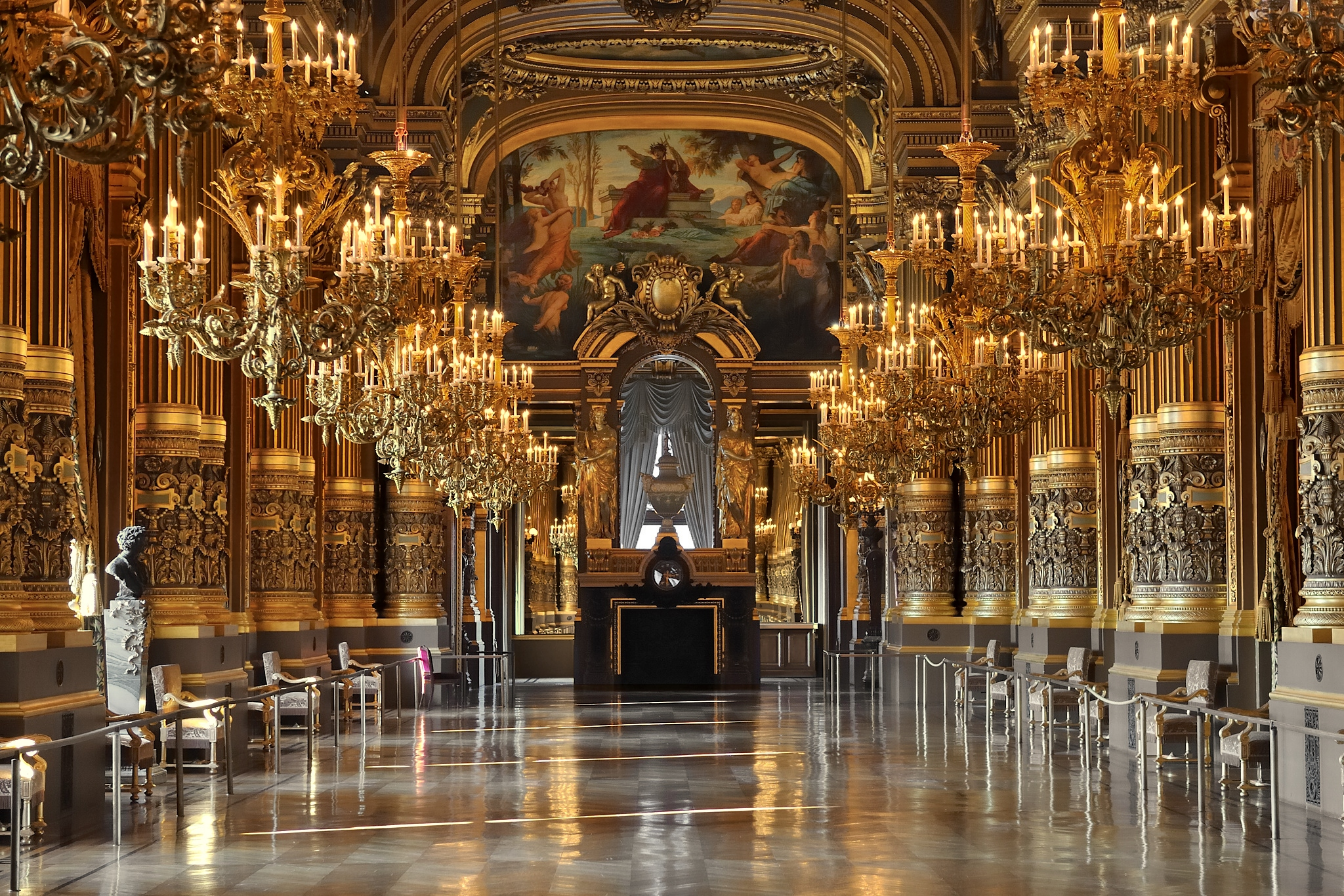
The Grand Foyer in the Palais Garnier, Paris (1875), influenced architecture around the world.

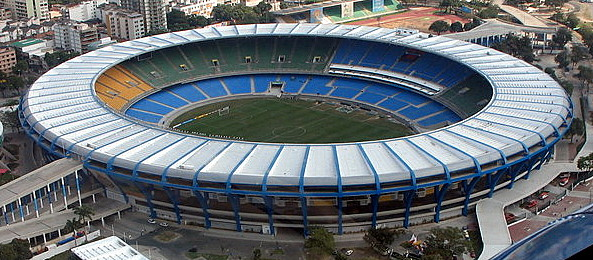
Maracanã, Rio de Janeiro, at inauguration (1950), the world's largest stadium by capacity

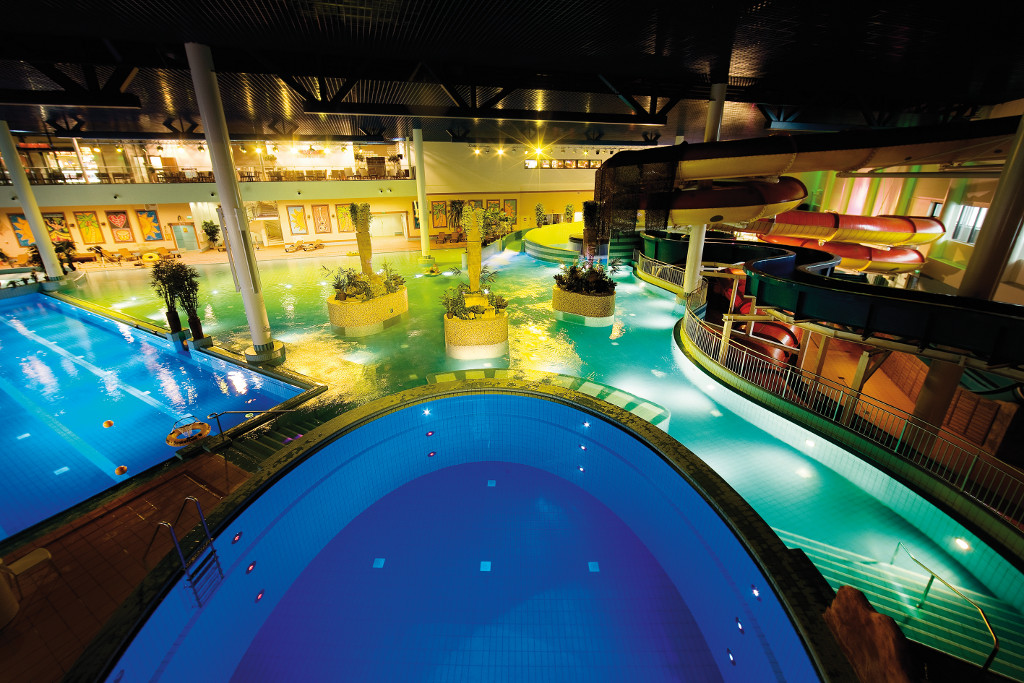
Flamingo Entertainment Centre, Vantaa (2008), includes a variety of entertainment activities (e.g., a cinema, spa, bowling, laser games, virtual experiences), 40 different stores and a hotel.

=== Architecture as entertainment ===
Inauthentic castle in Disneyland amusement park

Architects who push the boundaries of design or construction sometimes create buildings that are entertaining because they exceed the expectations of the public and the client and are aesthetically outstanding. Buildings such as the Guggenheim Museum Bilbao, designed by Frank Gehry, are of this type, becoming a tourist attraction as well as a significant international museum. Other apparently usable buildings are really follies, deliberately constructed for a decorative purpose and never intended to be practical.

On the other hand, sometimes architecture is entertainment, while pretending to be functional. The tourism industry, for example, creates or renovates buildings as "attractions" that have either never been used or can never be used for their ostensible purpose. They are instead repurposed to entertain visitors, often by simulating cultural experiences. Buildings, history and sacred spaces are thus made into commodities for purchase. Such intentional tourist attractions divorce buildings from the past so that "the difference between historical authenticity and contemporary entertainment venues/theme parks becomes hard to define". Examples include "the preservation of the Alcázar of Toledo, with its grim Civil War History, the conversion of slave dungeons into tourist attractions in Ghana, [such as, for example, Cape Coast Castle] and the presentation of indigenous culture in Libya". The specially constructed buildings in amusement parks represent the park's theme and are usually neither authentic nor completely functional.

== Effects of developments in electronic media ==
Arthur Sullivan on recording music
1888 wax cylinder recording of composer Arthur Sullivan speaking about his reaction to Thomas Edison's invention of the phonograph: ... I am astonished and somewhat terrified at the results of this evening's experiment – astonished at the wonderful power you have developed, and terrified at the thought that so much hideous and bad music may be put on record forever. But all the same, I think it is the most wonderful thing that I have ever experienced, and I congratulate you with all my heart on this wonderful discovery.

=== Globalisation ===
By the second half of the 20th century, developments in electronic media made possible the delivery of entertainment products to mass audiences across the globe. The technology enabled people to see, hear and participate in all the familiar forms – stories, theatre, music, dance – wherever they live. The rapid development of entertainment technology was assisted by improvements in data storage devices such as cassette tapes or compact discs, along with increasing miniaturisation. Computerisation and the development of barcodes also made ticketing easier, faster and global.

=== Obsolescence ===
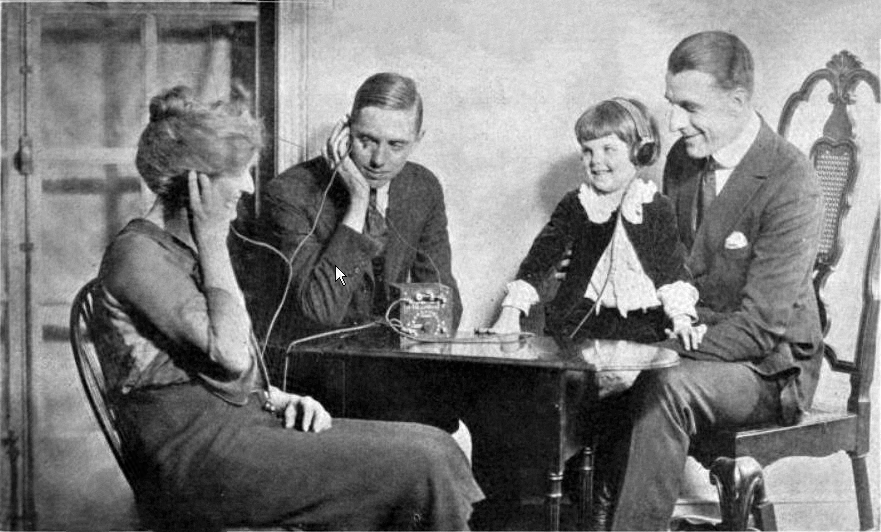
Magazine advertisement for crystal radio (1922)

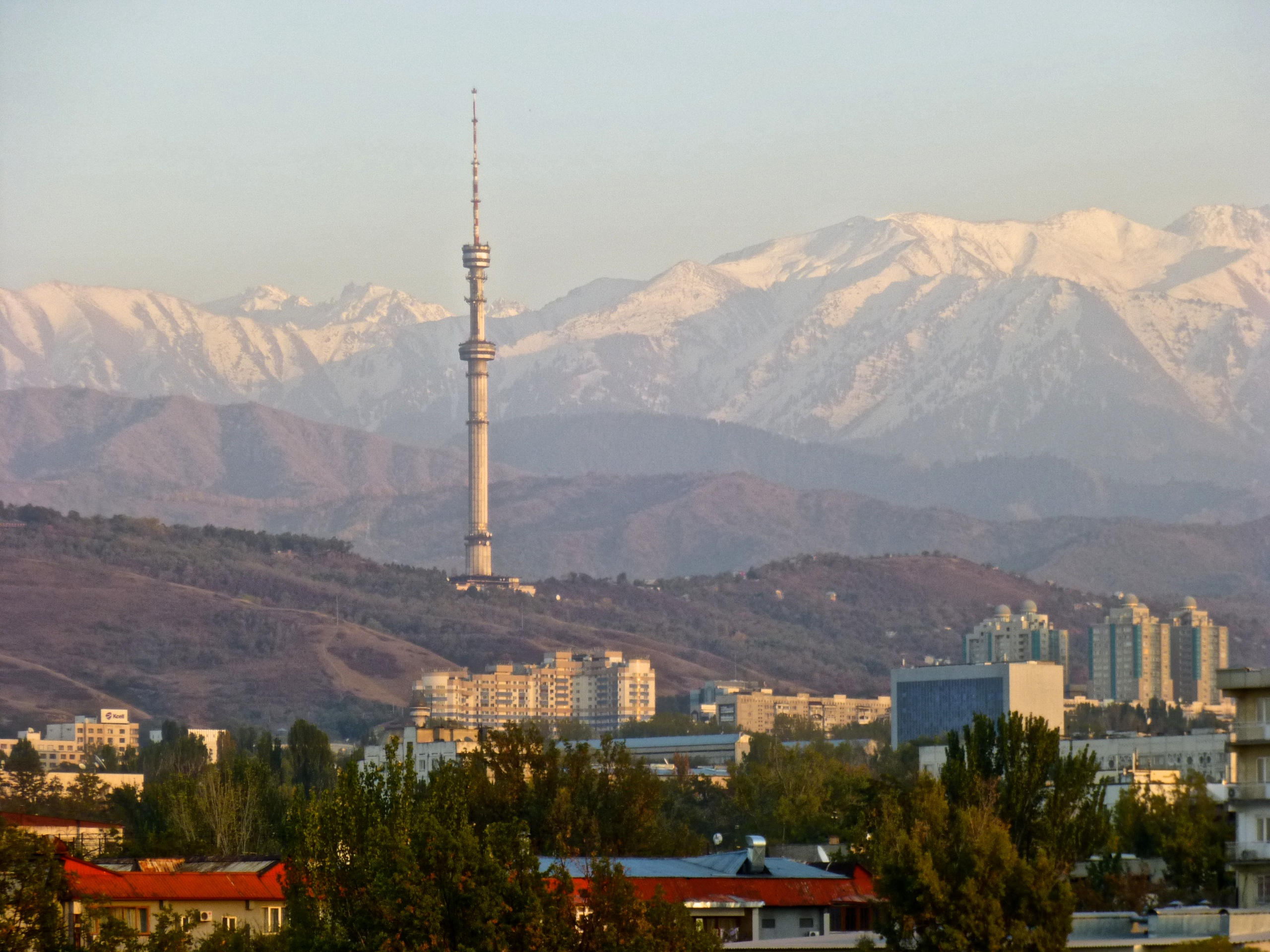
Television tower in Almaty, Kazakhstan (constructed 1983)

In the 1940s, radio was the electronic medium for family entertainment and information. In the 1950s, television was the new medium, and it rapidly became global, bringing visual entertainment, first in black and white, then in colour, to the world. By the 1970s, games could be played electronically; then hand-held devices provided mobile entertainment, and by the last decade of the 20th century, via networked play. In combination with products from the entertainment industry, all the traditional forms of entertainment became available personally. People could not only select an entertainment product such as a piece of music, film or game, but they could choose the time and place to use it. The "proliferation of portable media players and the emphasis on the computer as a site for film consumption" together have significantly changed how audiences encounter films. One of the most notable consequences of the rise of electronic entertainment has been the rapid obsolescence of the various recording and storage methods. As an example of speed of change driven by electronic media, over the course of one generation, television as a medium for receiving standardised entertainment products went from unknown, to novel, to ubiquitous and finally to superseded. One estimate was that by 2011 over 30 per cent of households in the US would own a Wii console, "about the same percentage that owned a television in 1953". Some expected that halfway through the second decade of the 21st century, online entertainment would have completely replaced television – which did not happen. The so-called "digital revolution" has produced an increasingly transnational marketplace that has caused difficulties for governments, business, industries, and individuals, as they all try to keep up. Even the sports stadium of the future will increasingly compete with television viewing "...in terms of comfort, safety and the constant flow of audio-visual information and entertainment available." Other flow-on effects of the shift are likely to include those on public architecture such as hospitals and nursing homes, where television, regarded as an essential entertainment service for patients and residents, will need to be replaced by access to the internet. At the same time, the ongoing need for entertainers as "professional engagers" shows the continuity of traditional entertainment.

=== Convergence ===
By the second decade of the 21st century, analogue recording was being replaced by digital recording and all forms of electronic entertainment began to converge. For example, convergence is challenging standard practices in the film industry: whereas "success or failure used to be determined by the first weekend of its run. Today, ... a series of exhibition 'windows', such as DVD, pay-per-view, and fibre-optic video-on-demand are used to maximise profits." Part of the industry's adjustment is its release of new commercial products directly via video hosting services. Media convergence is said to be more than technological: the convergence is cultural as well. It is also "the result of a deliberate effort to protect the interests of business entities, policy institutions and other groups". Globalisation and cultural imperialism are two of the cultural consequences of convergence. Others include fandom and interactive storytelling as well as the way that single franchises are distributed through and affect a range of delivery methods. The "greater diversity in the ways that signals may be received and packaged for the viewer, via terrestrial, satellite or cable television, and of course, via the Internet" also affects entertainment venues, such as sports stadia, which now need to be designed so that both live and remote audiences can interact in increasingly sophisticated ways – for example, audiences can "watch highlights, call up statistics", "order tickets and merchandise" and generally "tap into the stadium's resources at any time of the day or night".

The introduction of television altered the availability, cost, variety and quality of entertainment products for the public, and the convergence of online entertainment is having a similar effect. For example, the possibility and popularity of user-generated content, as distinct from commercial products, creates a "networked audience model [that] makes programming obsolete". Individuals and corporations use video hosting services to broadcast content that is equally accepted by the public as legitimate entertainment.

While technology increases demand for entertainment products and offers increased speed of delivery, the forms that make up the content are in themselves relatively stable. Storytelling, music, theatre, dance and games are recognisably the same as in earlier centuries.

== See also ==
- Entertainment law
- Family entertainment centre
- List of entertainer occupations
- Outline of entertainment
- Performing arts
- Performing arts education
- Social entertainment
